= Public Radio Service =

License free radio service in China

PRS409 channels
Channel	Frequency [MHz]
1	409.7500
2	409.7625
3	409.7750
4	409.7875
5	409.8000
6	409.8125
7	409.8250
8	409.8375
9 (Note: The Hong Kong Radio Association lists this channel as a rescue channel.)	409.8500
10	409.8625
11	409.8750
12	409.8875
13	409.9000
14	409.9125
15	409.9250
16	409.9375
17	409.9500
18	409.9625
19	409.9750
20	409.9875

Public Radio Service (PRS) (Chinese: 公众对讲机; pinyin: Gōngzhòng duìjiǎngjī) is a walkie-talkie personal radio service in the mainland of China, Hong Kong and Macau, but excluding Taiwan. It can be used without a license, and no fees are charged for the use of the frequencies. It uses 409 MHz. It is also known as PRS409. It is similar to the American and Canadian Family Radio Service (FRS) and PMR446 in the European Union.

== Technical information ==
The PRS radio channels use narrow-band frequency modulation (NBFM) with a maximum deviation of 2.5 kHz. The channels are spaced at 12.5 kHz intervals. They are limited to 500 milliwatts effective radiated power.

PRS radios are not allowed to be used at airports and onboard aircraft. They are not allowed to be connected to the public switched telephone network or cellular network.

== See also ==
- 70-centimeter band
- CDCSS
- Continuous Tone-Coded Squelch System (CTCSS)
- Family Radio Service (the equivalent of PRS in Canada, the US, and some other countries)
- General Mobile Radio Service
- KDR 444
- LPD433
- Multi-Use Radio Service
- Personal radio service
- Personal radio service#Taiwan
- UHF CB
