= Personal radio service =

Group of radio services

A personal radio service is any system that allows individuals to operate radio transmitters and receivers for personal purposes with minimal or no special license or individual authorization. Personal radio services exist around the world and typically use light-weight walkie talkie portable radios. The power output, antenna size, and technical characteristics of the equipment are set by regulations in each country. Many regions (for example, the European Union) have standardized personal radio service rules to allow travelers from one country to use their equipment in another country. Examples of standardized services include PMR446 and FM Citizens Band Radio (CB) in the EU and several other countries/regions. 26–27 MHz CB radio is the oldest personal radio service and is used in nearly every country worldwide, with many countries and regions copying the United States 40-channel frequency plan. In many countries, CB radio is less popular due to the availability of other personal radio services that offer shorter antennas and better protection from noise and interference.

A personal radio service handheld radio; this one is for use with the European PMR446 service

Because radio spectrum allocation varies around the world, a personal radio service device may not be usable outside its original area of purchase. For example, US-specification Family Radio Service radios operate on frequencies that in Europe are allocated to fire and emergency services. Operation of a personal radio device that causes interference to other services may result in prosecution. Some personal radio service frequency plans are regionally accepted, for example, the European PMR446 system is available in many countries, and the American FRS/GMRS system's channel plans have been adopted by Canada, Mexico and some countries in South America.

== Operating characteristics ==
Specific details vary between the different national services, but many personal radio services operate in the VHF or UHF part of the radio spectrum, using frequency modulation and a maximum power of only a few watts. Operation is on predetermined channels. Unlike commercial business, marine, aviation, or emergency services radio, all users in an area share access to the available channels, requiring cooperation for effective communications. Unlike amateur radio, experimentation with different types of apparatus, and modes of modulation is not permitted, and equipment must be factory-built and approved. Many of these services require non-removable antennas or place restrictions on antenna size, height or gain. The high-VHF band (137–174 MHz) and UHF bands (325, 900 MHz) are the most popular aside from the 25–28 MHz "HF CB" bands. There are notable exceptions to this, including the 78 MHz and 245 MHz Thai "CB 78" and "CB 245" VHF-FM bands, the 68–71 MHz Finnish band, the 30–31 MHz Swedish "Hunting Radio" band, and the 43 MHz Italian "VHF CB" bands. The lower frequency allocations (especially the 30/31 and 43 MHz bands) often exhibit propagation and communication range characteristics similar to 27 MHz CB radio. Higher frequencies (especially above 200 MHz) are almost exclusively line-of-sight.

These services are different from cellular mobile telephone systems in that no infrastructure (towers, base stations) is required; communications is point-to-point directly between users. However, this also means that communication range is usually limited to line-of-sight propagation, a few kilometres (miles) under the best of circumstances, and much less in heavily built up urban areas. Also unlike mobile telephones, operation is push-to-talk; a user must wait for the shared frequency to be clear before transmitting, and all stations on the frequency may hear the transmission. Since both stations are on the same frequency, the receiving station cannot interrupt the transmitter until it has finished. Generally only voice transmission is allowed under personal radio service regulations, although tone and digital selective calling features are allowed in some countries. Some services permit digital data transmission, either as part of digital "text messaging" and GPS location "sharing" with other nearby radios (such as FRS), or the services themselves involve digital voice and data transmissions (such as DPMR446/DMR446).

== Family Radio Service and derivatives ==
=== United States ===
In the United States, the Family Radio Service was authorized starting in 1996. Initially, it used half-watt hand-held FM UHF radios with 14 fixed channels near 462 and 467 MHz. For a time dual-standard FRS and General Mobile Radio Service (GMRS) radios were available, that could be operated without individual licensing on the FRS channels, but which required a license to operate on the GMRS frequencies at a power level above the FRS standard. In May 2017 the regulations were changed so that FRS service included operation at up to 2 watts on GMRS channels, and prohibiting the use of dual-standard radios in FRS service that would exceed the 2-watt limit.

=== Canada ===
American-standard FRS radios have been approved for use in Canada since April 2000. The revised technical standard RSS 210 has essentially the same technical requirements as in the United States. Since September 2004, low-power GMRS radios and dual-standard FRS/GMRS radios have also been approved for use in Canada, giving additional channels. In Canada, no license is required and no restrictions are imposed on the GMRS channels.

=== Mexico ===
Since tourists often bring their FRS radios with them, and since trade between the U.S., Canada, and Mexico is of great value to all three countries, the Mexican Secretary of Communication and Transportation has authorized use of the FRS frequencies and equipment similar to that in the US. Dual-mode FRS/GMRS equipment is not approved in Mexico, so caution should be exercised in operating hybrid FRS/GMRS devices purchased elsewhere.

=== South America ===
Dual-mode GMRS/FRS equipment is also approved in Brazil.

== Using other UHF and VHF frequencies ==
=== Australia and New Zealand ===
In Australia and New Zealand, the 77-channel (previously 40-channel) UHF CB citizen's band near 477 MHz is used for a similar purpose. In New Zealand hand-held transceivers are "class licensed" and require no individual registration. Repeaters may be used, but these require individual station licences. The Australian Communications and Media Authority (ACMA) also allocated a band near 434 MHz for low-powered devices with low potential for interference to other users of the band.

=== Bangladesh ===
The Bangladesh Telecommunications Regulatory Commission (BTRC) allows for use of the 26–27 MHz Citizen's Band (CB) allocation from 26.965 to 27.405 MHz (standard 40-channel allocation used in most of the world for CB). BTRC also permits usage of "Short Business Radio" (SBR) in the 245.000 to 246.000 MHz band. This is the same 245 MHz CB allocation as Thailand and uses the same channel plan (80 channels, 12.5 kHz steps). The BTRC considers both the 26–28 MHz CB and 245–246 MHz SBR allocations to be shared resources and all users must share the channels with other users of these two bands.

=== China ===
In China, Hong Kong and Macau, the Public Radio Service is a personal radio service similar to the American-style FRS. Twenty UHF channels near 409 MHz are allocated. Sometimes this is called "Citizen Band" or CB in China, but not to be confused with the Citizens Band radio within the 27 MHz band. FRS/GMRS and PMR446 radios are not approved for use in China.

FRS band radios may be found in use in China illegally, starting before the Chinese government opened the 409 MHz band to the public. Legal action against such usage is rare, because of the low power and short range of FRS radios.

List of China Public Radio Service Channels:

Channel	Frequency [MHz]
1	409.7500
2	409.7625
3	409.7750
4	409.7875
5	409.8000
6	409.8125
7	409.8250
8	409.8375
9	409.8500
10	409.8625
11	409.8750
12	409.8875
13	409.9000
14	409.9125
15	409.9250
16	409.9375
17	409.9500
18	409.9625
19	409.9750
20	409.9875

=== Europe ===
In Europe, PMR446 is a personal radio service with two sets of 16 channels and one set of 8 channels available for a total of 40 channels. The original PMR446 allocation for 16 channels from 446.00625 MHz to 446.19375 MHz with 12.5 kHz channel spacing steps has been complemented with two digital channel plans (sometimes called "DMR446" or "DPMR446"). Digital FDMA offers another 16 channels from 446.103125 MHz to 446.196875 MHz with 6.25 kHz channel spacing steps. 4-level FSK modulation at 3.6 kbit/s is used. Digital DMR Tier I TDMA PMR446 channels are also available, eight channels from 446.10625 MHz to 446.19375 MHz with 12.5 kHz channel spacing steps. 4-level FSK modulation at 3.6 kbit/s is used. All three of the PMR446 channel plans occupy the same European-harmonized 446.0 MHz to 446.2 MHz frequency band.

One cannot legally use the FRS radio in Europe or PMR446 in the U.S. The 446 MHz band is allocated to amateur radio in the United States. In Great Britain, FRS frequencies are used for fire brigade communications and this sometimes causes problems when FRS equipment is imported from the U.S. and used without awareness of the consequences by members of the public. A similar situation exists with the German Freenet VHF CB allocation, the American MURS VHF CB allocation, and the Australian/New Zealand UHF CB allocation at 476–477 MHz. Use of Australian UHF CB equipment in the United States would cause severe interference to public safety communications, especially in larger metropolitan areas.

European countries also have LPD devices operating in the 433 MHz band; these devices are restricted to 10 mW output power and are intended to provide an alternative to PMR446 over short distances. Additionally, most European countries allow use of the 26.965 – 27.405 MHz US FCC Citizen's Band Radio allocation (40 channels). Some countries allow more channels (for example, Germany has an extra 40-channel allocation from 26.565 to 27.955 MHz, making a total of 80 available CB channels) or other modes. Many countries allow the use of both AM and FM modulation, with some (including the UK) allowing the use of SSB as well.

=== Finland ===
Finland has a 26-channel mid-band (68–72 MHz) VHF-FM allocation called "RHA68" consisting of "common channels for hobby usage in general". No license, examination or fee is required to operate in the RHA68 band. The channels may be referred to by their sequential number or by alphanumeric designation per Finnish law. Power limit is 5 watts for hand-portable stations and 25 watts for mobile stations on all of group A channels and on group E channels 15, 16 and 18–21. Base stations may only be used on group A channels with maximum transmitting power of 15 watts.

Channel group A

Channel	Frequency	Usage	Power limit
1	68.100 MHz	Roadside assistance organizations	25 W
2	68.300 MHz	Motor sports	25 W
3	68.425 MHz	Voluntary rescue service	25 W
4	68.525 MHz	Motor sports	25 W
17	68.225 MHz	Voluntary rescue service	25 W

Channel group E

Channel	Frequency	Usage	Power limit
5	68.050 MHz	General use	5 W
6	68.575 MHz	General use	5 W
7	68.175 MHz	General use	5 W
8	67.500 MHz	General use	5 W
9	71.375 MHz	General use	5 W
10	71.425 MHz	General use	5 W
11	71.475 MHz	General use	5 W
12	71.625 MHz	General use	5 W
13	70.200 MHz	General use	5 W
14	71.025 MHz	General use	5 W
15	71.050 MHz	General use	25 W
16	71.100 MHz	General use	25 W
18	68.375 MHz	General use	25 W
19	71.175 MHz	General use	25 W
20	71.750 MHz	General use	25 W
21	71.900 MHz	General use	25 W
22	71.350 MHz	General use	5 W
23	71.550 MHz	General use	5 W
24	71.575 MHz	General use	5 W
25	71.600 MHz	General use	5 W
26	72.325 MHz	General use	5 W

=== Germany ===
In addition to license-free PMR446, CB and SRD/LPD433 radio, Germany has a VHF-FM allocation called Freenet that allows a maximum of 1 W (ERP) of power on six channels in the 149 MHz band.

1. 149.0250 MHz
2. 149.0375 MHz
3. 149.0500 MHz
4. 149.0875 MHz
5. 149.1000 MHz
6. 149.1125 MHz

The Freenet allocation is a re-purposing of the old B-Netz mobile telephone service. It is similar in scope and purpose to the Multi-Use Radio Service (MURS) in the United States, and the "Jagtradio" (Hunting Radio) services in Norway and Sweden.

=== India ===
India has a 13-channel UHF-FM service known as "Short Range Radio" or "SRR" that operates in the 350.225–350.400 MHz band with a maximal output power of 2 watts. FM mode is used with 12.5 kHz channel spacing.

1. 350.2250 MHz
2. 350.2625 MHz
3. 350.2750 MHz
4. 350.2875 MHz
5. 350.3000 MHz
6. 350.3125 MHz
7. 350.3250 MHz
8. 350.3375 MHz
9. 350.3500 MHz
10. 350.3625 MHz
11. 350.3750 MHz
12. 350.3875 MHz
13. 350.4000 MHz

In August 2005, India deregulated the 26.957–27.283 MHz band for license-free CB radio usage with a maximum power output of 5 watts. The channel plan follows channels 1–27 from the standard 40 channel CB plan originally adopted by the United States (and most other countries worldwide). Channel 1 is 26.965 and channel 27 is 27.275 MHz. Use of frequencies below 26.965 or above 27.275 is not permitted in India. Multi-norm mobile CB radios are now being shipped with the 27 channel India CB frequency plan programmed in them.

=== Indonesia ===
Two frequency bands available: VHF-FM (142–143 MHz VHF CB) and UHF-FM (476–477 MHz UHF CB).

Indonesia allows 40 channels from 476.425 MHz to 477.400 MHz at 25 kHz channel spacing. It is the same channel plan as the original 40 channel Australia/New Zealand UHF CB allocation. Indonesia also has a 60-channel VHF-FM service available from 142.050 MHz to 143.525 MHz (channels spaced every 25 kHz). Indonesia also permits usage of the standardized 26.965–27.405 MHz HF CB band with AM/SSB modes allowed.

The new frequency allocations (142 & 476 MHz) were regulated in a decision by the Director General of Posts and Telecommunications in decree Number 92 Year 1994 on Implementing Regulation of the Inter-Citizens Radio Communications.

=== Italy ===
Italy allows use of the European standardized 40-channel 26/27 MHz CB band, plus a 34-channel allocation from 26.875 MHz to 27.245 MHz, giving Italian HF CB a total of 49 channels between to two CB bands (Band I1: 26.965–27.405, Band I2: 26.875–27.245). In addition to this, Italy has a "VHF CB" allocation at 43 MHz, usually called "Apparati a 43 MHz" or "CB 43 MHz". Italy, like many other countries, suffers from extremely lax enforcement of radio communications laws, and "freeband" modified equipment covering wider frequency ranges as well as amplifiers are widely available and openly advertised by communications equipment vendors. "Freebanding" occurs with both the 27 MHz area (often as low as 25 MHz and as high as 30 MHz) and the 43 MHz area (as 43 MHz CB equipment is often modified to cover down to 34 MHz and up to 47 MHz, using 12.5 kHz steps). There is evidence of these frequencies being used outside of Italy for illegal "CB-like" operations.

Italian 43 MHz "VHF CB" or "43 MHz CB" allocation. 24 channels, FM mode, 12.5 kHz channel spacing. Each channel has a "recommended use" associated with it. Portable handheld (walkie-talkie), in-vehicle mobile and base station transceivers are available for this band. Channels are numbered in straight sequence, however many transceivers marketed for this band also include a frequency display. Due to the low-VHF band frequency characteristics of this band, it is often used as an adjunct to, or replacement for, the traditional 26–27 MHz CB allocations.

1. 43.3000 MHz – Rescue, Road/Traffic Control, Forestry, Hunting, Fishing, Security
2. 43.3125 MHz – Rescue, Road/Traffic Control, Forestry, Hunting, Fishing, Security
3. 43.3250 MHz – Rescue, Road/Traffic Control, Forestry, Hunting, Fishing, Security
4. 43.3375 MHz – Rescue, Road/Traffic Control, Forestry, Hunting, Fishing, Security
5. 43.3500 MHz – Rescue, Road/Traffic Control, Forestry, Hunting, Fishing, Security
6. 43.3625 MHz – Rescue, Road/Traffic Control, Forestry, Hunting, Fishing, Security
7. 43.3750 MHz – Industrial, Commercial, Agricultural, Crafts
8. 43.3875 MHz – Industrial, Commercial, Agricultural, Crafts
9. 43.4000 MHz – Industrial, Commercial, Agricultural, Crafts
10. 43.4125 MHz – Industrial, Commercial, Agricultural, Crafts
11. 43.4250 MHz – Industrial, Commercial, Agricultural, Crafts
12. 43.4375 MHz – Industrial, Commercial, Agricultural, Crafts
13. 43.4500 MHz – For safety of life at sea, Marine Use (Ship-to-Ship/Ship-to-Shore), Marinas and Harbors
14. 43.4625 MHz – For safety of life at sea, Marine Use (Ship-to-Ship/Ship-to-Shore), Marinas and Harbors
15. 43.4750 MHz – For safety of life at sea, Marine Use (Ship-to-Ship/Ship-to-Shore), Marinas and Harbors
16. 43.4875 MHz – For safety of life at sea, Marine Use (Ship-to-Ship/Ship-to-Shore), Marinas and Harbors
17. 43.5000 MHz – To aid in the administration of sports and other competitive activities
18. 43.5125 MHz – To aid in the administration of sports and other competitive activities
19. 43.5250 MHz – To aid in the administration of sports and other competitive activities
20. 43.5375 MHz – to aid in the administration of sports and other competitive activities
21. 43.5500 MHz – For use by health professionals, doctors, hospitals, and activities related to them.
22. 43.5625 MHz – For use by health professionals, doctors, hospitals, and activities related to them.
23. 43.5750 MHz – For use by health professionals, doctors, hospitals, and activities related to them.
24. 43.5875 MHz – For use by health professionals, doctors, hospitals, and activities related to them.

=== Japan ===
Japan has several services in the VHF and UHF bands:

Japan's Specified Low Power Radio (特定小電力無線局, tokutei shōdenryoku musenkyoku) or SLPR service covers a variety of low-power uses, and does not require registration. Walkie-talkies are limited to 10 mW in the 420, 421, and 422 MHz bands.

- Simplex: 422.2000–422.3000 MHz (Leisure use), 10 mW, 9 channels, 12.5 kHz spacing
- Simplex: 422.0500–422.1750 MHz (Business use), 10 mW, 11 channels, 12.5 kHz spacing
- Duplex: 421.8125–421.9125 MHz (paired with 440.2625–440.3625 MHz) (Leisure use), 10 mW, 12.5 kHz spacing
- Duplex: 421.575-421.800 MHz (paired with 440.025-440.250 MHz) (Business use), 10 mW, 12.5 kHz spacing

Digital Simple Radio (デジタル簡易無線, dejitaru kan'i musenkyoku) covers 351 MHz UHF digital service for leisure and business use. Radios must be registered and equipped with a built-in control ROM for automatic digital callsign identification.

- 351.16875–351.19375 MHz, digital voice and data, 1 watt, 5 channels, 6.25 kHz spacing
- 351.20000–351.38125 MHz, digital voice and data, 5 watts, 30 channels, 6.25 kHz spacing

142 & 146 MHz VHF-Digital "Personal Radio" service for Personal, Leisure and Family use. Radios must be equipped with a GPS and built-in control ROM for automatic digital callsign identification.

- 142.934375–142.984375 MHz, 146.934375–146.984375 MHz, digital voice and GPS data, 0.5 watts, 18 channels, 6.25 kHz spacing

=== Malaysia ===
On 1 April 2010, the Malaysian Communications and Multimedia Commission (MCMC) introduced PMR446 (446.00625 MHz to 446.093750 MHz and 446.103125 MHz to 446.196875 MHz) in addition to 26.965 MHz to 27.405 MHz as a class assignment. Subsequently, the MCMC revoked 477 MHz personal radio service as a class assignment on 1 January 2022.

=== Norway ===
Norway has a Short distance radio service (called "KDR444" to distinguish it from similar services such as PMR446) with six UHF FM channels between 444.600 and 444.975 MHz. Some dual-mode KDR/PMR radios are sold but are only usable in Sweden and Norway. Norway has a 6-channel VHF FM Jaktradio (Hunting Radio) service, maximum power 5 watts. Because both Norway and Sweden have high-band VHF FM hunting allocations (see section on Sweden below), many hunting radios are marketed with both the 6 Norse channels and 7 Swedish channels in one unit.

1. 143.900 MHz
2. 139.400 MHz
3. 143.350 MHz
4. 138.850 MHz
5. 143.250 MHz
6. 138.750 MHz

=== Philippines ===
The Philippines has a radio service for use of families and small businesses. This service is called SRRS or Short Range Radio Service. Repeaters are not permitted, and units are limited to 2.5 watts.

This service has been allocated 40 channels at 325 MHz:

Channel	Frequency [MHz]	Channel	Frequency [MHz]	Channel	Frequency [MHz]	Channel	Frequency [MHz]
1	325.0000	11	325.1250	21	325.2500	31	325.3750
2	325.0125	12	325.1375	22	325.2625	32	325.3875
3	325.0250	13	325.1500	23	325.2750	33	325.4000
4	325.0375	14	325.1625	24	325.2875	34	325.4125
5	325.0500	15	325.1750	25	325.3000	35	325.4250
6	325.0625	16	325.1875	26	325.3125	36	325.4375
7	325.0750	17	325.2000	27	325.3250	37	325.4500
8	325.0875	18	325.2125	28	325.3375	38	325.4625
9	325.1000	19	325.2250	29	325.3500	39	325.4750
10	325.1125	20	325.2375	30	325.3625	40	325.4875

=== Singapore ===
Since 3 February 2004, the Infocomm Media Development Authority of Singapore (IMDA) has allocated the 446.0–446.1 MHz frequency band for low-powered walkie-talkies on a non-interference, non-protected and shared-use basis. As these walkie-talkies are low-powered devices which do not potentially cause interference to other licensed radio services, it need not be licensed for use in Singapore. However, the device must be type approved by IMDA for local sale. These personal radios (or walkie talkies in local parlance) are generally programmed with the first 8 channels of the PMR446 frequencies.

=== South Africa ===
South Africa is in the process of conforming to ITC region 1 recommendations. They do allow 8 channels between 446.0 – 446.1 MHz band currently, this is the same as the European PMR446.

There are two HF AM/SSB CB bands available for use in South Africa, 27 MHz and 29 MHz. There are some radio transceivers sold that include both "27 Megs" and "29 Megs" however some only include one band or the other.

South Africa also has a 23-channel allocation between 29.710 MHz and 29.985 MHz. This service commonly referred to as "29 Megs" or "29 MHz CB". Channels are 12.5 kHz apart. This service is shared between land mobile users, marine users, and civil defense/rural firefighting users. AM mode may be used on any channel, while SSB may only be used on specified channels 29.7475 MHz, 29.8225 MHz, 29.8475 MHz, 29.9475 MHz and 29.985 MHz. Maximum output power is 5 watts carrier power in AM mode and 12 watts PEP power in SSB mode. These frequencies are heavily used by the 4x4 and Land Rover communities as well as by safari companies. The 4-Wheel Drive Club of South Africa (4WDC) uses their own internal channel numbering scheme for these frequencies. Three of these channels (designated 1/A, 2/B and 3/C) are designated for use by marine operators. These frequencies offer excellent range over water (20 – 30 km or more depending on antenna installation) and are heavily used by ski boats and fishing clubs, often as an adjunct to the internationally allocated Marine VHF radio band.

South Africa's use of 29 MHz for marine purposes is similar to Australia's use of 27 MHz for marine radio. Australia allows use of the standard 26.965–27.405 MHz AM/SSB 40 channel CB band for land mobile (and marine) communications plus 10 marine-only AM channels in the 27.68–27.98 MHz band. Many coast guard stations monitor 27 Meg channel 88 (27.880 MHz) in addition to VHF channel 16 (156.800 MHz) for distress, safety information and calling. Several 27 MHz marine transceivers sold in Australia are also available in South Africa (programmed for the South African 29 MHz frequencies). This allows for one transceiver to be sold in both Australia (27 MHz marine frequencies) and South Africa (29 MHz marine frequencies).

1. 29.7100 MHz – Mobile (AM)
2. 29.7225 MHz – Mobile (AM)
3. 29.7350 MHz – Mobile (AM)
4. 29.7475 MHz – Civil Defense – Base/Mobile (AM/SSB)
5. 29.7600 MHz – Mobile (AM) – 4WDC Channel 4
6. 29.7725 MHz – Marine "Channel B" or "Channel 2" and Mobile (AM only) – 4WDC Channel 5
7. 29.7850 MHz – Mobile (AM)
8. 29.7975 MHz – Mobile (AM)
9. 29.8100 MHz – Mobile (AM)
10. 29.8225 MHz – Civil Defense – Base/Mobile (AM/SSB) – 4WDC Channel 3
11. 29.8350 MHz – Mobile (AM)
12. 29.8475 MHz – Civil Defense (Primary) – Base/Mobile (AM/SSB)
13. 29.8600 MHz – Mobile (AM)
14. 29.8725 MHz – Mobile (AM) – 4WDC Channel 2
15. 29.8850 MHz – Mobile (AM)
16. 29.8975 MHz – Mobile (AM) – 4WDC Channel 1
17. 29.9100 MHz – Mobile (AM)
18. 29.9225 MHz – Mobile, Rural Fire Fighting Use (AM)
19. 29.9350 MHz – Marine "Channel A" or "Channel 1" (AM) – Marine Calling Channel
20. 29.9475 MHz – Civil Defense – Base/Mobile (AM/SSB)
21. 29.9600 MHz – Mobile (AM)
22. 29.9725 MHz – Marine "Channel C" or "Channel 3" and Mobile (AM only)
23. 29.9850 MHz – Civil Defense – Base/Mobile (AM/SSB)

South Africa allows use of nine 27 MHz CB frequencies between 27.185 MHz and 27.275 MHz (27 MHz CB channels 19–27). Maximal output power is 5 watts carrier power in AM mode and 12 watts PEP power in SSB mode. As with the 29 MHz allocation, each frequency is assigned to either AM only or SSB operation. Channels 19–22 (27.185–27.225 MHz) are designated for AM use and channels 23–27 (27.255–27.275 MHz) are designated for SSB use.

=== South Korea ===
UHF-FM 448.750–449.2625 MHz band allocation similar to the American FRS and European PMR446 services. 25 channel FM with 500 mW maximal power output. 12.5 kHz channel spacing with skips. As with FRS/GMRS and PMR446, the use of tone squelch systems such as CTCSS/DCS is encouraged. Like the PMR446, LPD433, Japan's 421–422 MHz SLPR service and KDR444 services, use of these frequencies in countries such as the United States is illegal without an amateur radio license as they fall within the 420–450 MHz 70 cm ham radio allocation.

1. 448.7500 MHz
2. 448.7625 MHz
3. 448.7750 MHz
4. 448.7875 MHz
5. 448.8000 MHz
6. 448.8125 MHz
7. 448.8250 MHz
8. 448.8375 MHz
9. 448.8500 MHz
10. 448.8625 MHz
11. 448.8750 MHz
12. 448.8875 MHz
13. 448.9000 MHz
14. 448.9125 MHz
15. 448.9250 MHz
16. 449.1500 MHz
17. 449.1625 MHz
18. 449.1750 MHz
19. 449.1875 MHz
20. 449.2000 MHz
21. 449.2125 MHz
22. 449.2250 MHz
23. 449.2375 MHz
24. 449.2500 MHz
25. 449.2625 MHz

=== Sweden ===
Similar to Norway, Sweden also has Jaktradio (Hunting Radio) allocations, 6 channels in the 155.400–155.525 MHz band and 40 channels in the 30–31 MHz band. In addition to these, the general purpose channel 156.000 MHz is available. 156.000 MHz is sometimes included as Marine VHF radio "channel 0" or "M1" (private) channel, allowing communication between portables and radios mounted in boats. Modulation is FM, maximal power 4 watts for 30–31 MHz and 5 watts for 155 MHz.

The 30/31 MHz band is sometimes referred to as "PR31" or "Jakt 31 MHz" to avoid confusion with the 155 MHz Jaktradio frequencies. Due to the proximity of this band in frequency to the 26–27 MHz CB band and the wide availability of modified CB or 10-meter amateur radio transceivers that cover up to 32 MHz, some operations on these channels involve the use of modified equipment.

Handheld radios are available for these frequencies, with some models including both the 30/31 MHz band and the 155 MHz band.

VHF-FM High Band 155 MHz Jaktradio:

1. 155.400 MHz
2. 155.425 MHz
3. 155.450 MHz
4. 155.475 MHz
5. 155.500 MHz
6. 155.525 MHz
7. 156.000 MHz (general-purpose channel sometimes grouped with the other hunting channels)

VHF-FM Low Band 31 MHz Jaktradio:

1. 30.930 MHz
2. 30.940 MHz
3. 30.950 MHz
4. 30.960 MHz
5. 30.970 MHz
6. 31.030 MHz
7. 31.040 MHz
8. 31.050 MHz
9. 31.060 MHz
10. 31.070 MHz
11. 31.080 MHz
12. 31.090 MHz
13. 31.100 MHz
14. 31.110 MHz
15. 31.120 MHz
16. 31.130 MHz
17. 31.140 MHz
18. 31.150 MHz
19. 31.160 MHz
20. 31.170 MHz
21. 31.180 MHz
22. 31.190 MHz
23. 31.200 MHz
24. 31.210 MHz
25. 31.220 MHz
26. 31.230 MHz
27. 31.240 MHz
28. 31.250 MHz
29. 31.260 MHz
30. 31.270 MHz
31. 31.280 MHz
32. 31.290 MHz
33. 31.300 MHz
34. 31.310 MHz
35. 31.320 MHz
36. 31.330 MHz
37. 31.340 MHz
38. 31.350 MHz
39. 31.360 MHz
40. 31.370 MHz

=== Thailand ===
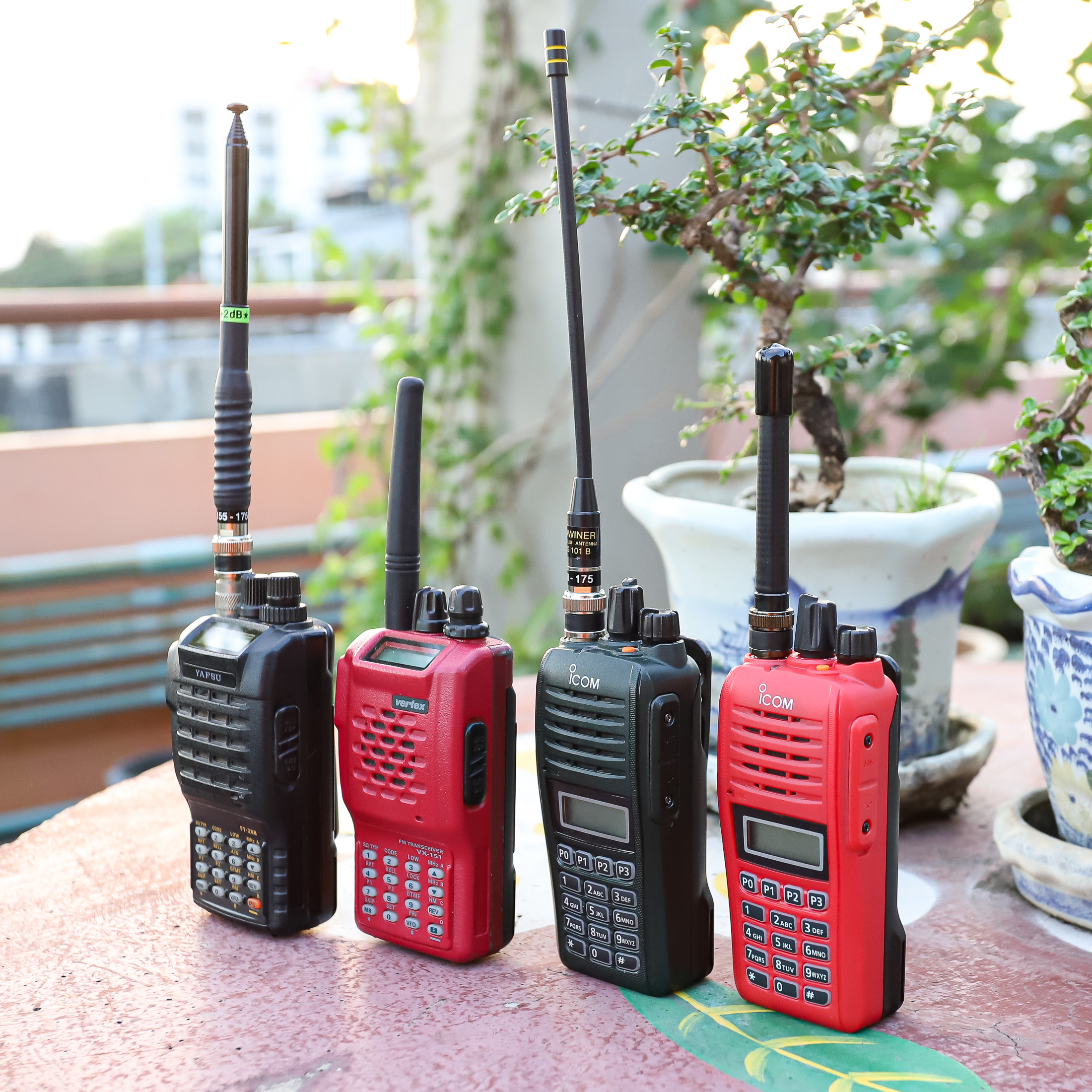
CB 245 MHz use a red case to indicate that it is a Citizen Band in the VHF 245-246 MHz frequency range.

Thailand has two 80 channel and 160 channel CB-style services, one in mid-band VHF 78 MHz band and another at high-band VHF 245 MHz band. Both services use FM mode only. Per Thai law, 78 MHz transceivers must have a yellow case. 245 MHz transceivers must have a red case. The HF (26 – 27 MHz band) CB service is not allowed in Thailand. 78 MHz takes the place of traditional 27 MHz CB for truckers, etc.

The 78 MHz CB allocation is primarily used by mobile and base stations, although handheld radios for 78 MHz are available. The lower frequency allows for longer communication range in rural and suburban areas compared to the 245 MHz service. 78 MHz is popular with trucking companies, buses, taxi companies and other transportation users, often in conjunction with 245 MHz. This service is commonly referred to as "CB78", "VHF78", "CB 78 MHz" or simply "78 MHz". Frequency allocation is between 78.0000 and 78.9875 MHz. Channels are spaced 12.5 kHz apart for a total of 80 channels in straight numerical sequence (channel 1 is 78.0000 MHz, channel 80 is 78.9875 MHz). Units are allowed up to 10 watts PEP RF power. External high-gain antennas are permitted. Base station antennas are permitted and base stations are commonly found in this band. Use of selective calling and tone squelch systems such as DTMF, CTCSS and DCS are allowed. According to Thai law, transceivers operating on the 78 MHz band must have a yellow case.

The 245 MHz CB allocation is more popular than the 78 MHz service, especially in urban areas. This service is commonly referred to as "CB245", "VHF245" or "VHF CB 245 MHz". Frequency allocation is between 245.0000 and 246.9875 MHz. Channels are spaced 12.5 kHz apart for a total of 160 channels in straight numerical sequence (channel 1 is 245.0000 MHz, channel 160 is 246.9875 MHz). Units are allowed up to 10 watts PEP RF power. External high-gain antennas are permitted. Base station antennas are permitted. Besides personal use, the equipment is used by search and rescue organizations, businesses, security guards, taxi companies and delivery services. In urban areas, simplex repeaters, usually mounted on the roofs of high-rise buildings, are used to increase communication range. CTCSS and DCS are often used due to heavy channel congestion in urban areas. Operating rules are less restrictive than amateur radio service, with an initial license fee required. According to Thai law, transceivers operating on the 245 MHz band must have a red case. There are an estimated one million users of the 245 MHz VHF CB service, often in large cities.

=== Taiwan ===
Some manufacturers in Taiwan have radios that carry both American FRS and GMRS frequencies, and have additional channels 1 to 99. Channels 1 to 14 are well-known, while channels 15 to 99 are less popular. While radios designed for the Taiwan market have FRS/GMRS frequencies as part of their channel plan, it is still technically illegal to use equipment designed for the Taiwan market in the United States. All Taiwan FRS radios must be certified by the NCC, and the device must bear the NCC approval label to be legally sold or used in Taiwan. Certified FRS radios shall not exceed 1.0 Watts (W) or 1000 milliwatts (mW) Effective Radiated Power (ERP). Taiwan FRS radios may include CTCSS or PL tones, like the FRS and GMRS radios in the United States. Further information about the Taiwan FRS radio service can be found on the official Taiwan NCC website, under Regulation LP0002, subsection 5.5, and may be subject to change without notice.

Taiwan FRS, 14 channels, 12.5 kHz spacing, and corresponding US FRS/GMRS channels:

1. 467.5125 MHz
2. 467.5250 MHz
3. 467.5375 MHz
4. 467.5500 MHz – US GMRS Repeater Ch 15/23 Input
5. 467.5625 MHz – US FRS Channel 8
6. 467.5750 MHz – US GMRS Repeater Ch 16/24 Input
7. 467.5875 MHz – US FRS Channel 9
8. 467.6000 MHz – US GMRS Repeater Ch 17/25 Input
9. 467.6125 MHz – US FRS Channel 10
10. 467.6250 MHz – US GMRS Repeater Ch 18/26 Input
11. 467.6375 MHz – US FRS Channel 11
12. 467.6500 MHz – US GMRS Repeater Ch 19/27 Input
13. 467.6625 MHz – US FRS Channel 12
14. 467.6750 MHz – US GMRS Repeater Ch 20/28 Input

=== United States ===
In addition to the UHF FRS and GMRS allocation and the high-HF CB allocation, in 2000, the American FCC allocated five VHF channels to the Multi-Use Radio Service (MURS). Like CB, MURS frequencies may be used for business or personal/family communications. Two of these frequencies were re-allocated from the Business/Industrial Radio Pool (Business Radio Service). These two frequencies were often used illegally by businesses as they were/are part of the "color dot" frequencies that handheld "on-site" business radios come pre-programmed with. Channels 1–3 were not allocated as part of the "color dot" frequencies and therefore do not generally have "grandfathered" business users on them (see below).

1. 151.82 MHz
2. 151.88 MHz
3. 151.94 MHz
4. 154.57 MHz "Blue Dot"
5. 154.6 MHz "Green Dot"

All five channels now see significant use by businesses, as well as mobile-to-mobile users. Use of squelch systems such as CTCSS and DCS on the MURS frequencies is encouraged to facilitate frequency sharing. Voice and data transmissions are permitted on the MURS frequencies. AM and FM modes are permitted on the MURS frequencies for both data and voice transmission (see FCC rules Part 95.631). However, store-and-forward digital operations are not permitted and transmitters must not operate in continuous-carrier (constant transmit) mode. External antennas are permitted, transmitter output power is limited to 2 watts. MURS is often used for data transmissions as well as portable and mobile voice communications, due to the external high-gain antenna provision, MURS offers the possibility of greater range than FRS. As with CB, FRS and GMRS, there are reports of users using higher-than-legal power levels on the MURS frequencies.

== Using HF range ==
Citizens Band radio is a family of services available in different countries and with different operating rules, generally using channels in the 27 MHz part of the radio spectrum. 26–27 MHz occupies the "boundary area" between HF (3–30 MHz) and VHF (30–300 MHz). This means that CB signals provide local coverage similar to low-band VHF during times of low sunspot activity. However, during the peak of the sunspot cycle, CB frequencies exhibit skywave propagation just like the lower parts of HF do, making communication hundreds or even thousands of miles (km) away possible. While some operators seek out long distance "DX" contacts on CB frequencies and on frequencies above channel 40 and below channel 1 (a practice referred to as "freebanding" or "outbanding"), interference from distant stations will often make local communication extremely difficult or impossible during band openings. CB was, and still is, designed for short-distance (local) communications needs. Until recently, US FCC law prohibited communicating with any station more than 250 km (155.3 miles) on CB frequencies. (150-mile rule deleted by FCC September 2017) Like many rules regarding the HF CB services, the distance prohibition is largely ignored and unenforced. Often as a result of channel overcrowding and interference, many HF CB users have turned to purchasing "export" or "10-meter" radios that operate in the legal CB band but also provide access to frequencies above and below the CB band. Other CB users purchase amplifiers to increase their output power and "punch through" interference caused by distant stations (or by local stations running amplifiers). This has created a tragedy of the commons situation in and near the HF CB spectrum (25–28 MHz). As more users purchase amplifiers and operate on out-of-band frequencies, more interference is produced, forcing others to acquire even more powerful equipment to punch through even more interference, and/or to acquire transceivers capable of accessing more frequencies so that a clear frequency may be found. Many CB users have moved to other personal radio services to avoid these issues.

When first developed in the United States, CB operation required an individual license fee. After the surge in popularity in the mid-1970s, licensing was deprecated. Other countries provided legislation to allow use of similar frequencies and operating modes. The 26.965–27.405 MHz 40-channel American channel plan serves as the frequency plan for many other countries HF CB service, including Canada, Australia, Mexico, most of Central and South America and the European Union. FM may be used throughout Europe on the standard 40 channels – called the "mid band" or "CEPT" channels. Many countries also allow AM in addition to FM or AM/FM/SSB with various different power limits. European standardization allows a maximum of 4 watts FM power or 1 watt AM carrier power.

Others, such as Germany, Russia, and Brazil, allow more than 40 legal channels. Germany has an 80-channel allocation – the 40 CEPT/American channels plus 40 channels from 26.565 to 26.955 MHz in straight 10 kHz sequence. Germany only allows FM on channels 41–80. Brazil allows for 80 channels from 26.965 to 27.855 MHz with AM/SSB permitted. Brazil allows higher power levels than the US and most of Europe. New Zealand has two 40-channel HF CB bands available, the NZ-specific "NZ CB Band" 26.330–26.770 MHz (40 channels, AM and SSB allowed) and the standardized "mid band" 26.965–27.405 MHz (40 channels, AM and SSB allowed) for a total of 80 HF CB channels.

In Russia, HF CB radio is extremely popular, especially with taxicab, trucking, delivery and general transportation users. Due to the sheer size of Russia and the remoteness of many Russian communities, CB radio is an important resource. Russian CB operators and clubs have installed several simplex repeaters on mountaintops or the roofs of high-rise apartment buildings to increase communication range of low-powered mobile CB radios. Some of these repeaters feature CTCSS/PL tone protection, remote control via DTMF, linking via Internet gateways, simulcasting via several repeaters at once, and cross-band repeat connections to the UHF PMR446 service. Cities such as Moscow and St. Petersburg feature motorist emergency services that are directly accessible via a CB frequency monitored by police and other emergency services. Other services provided by cities in Russia include weather broadcasts and travel/traffic information and warnings via specific CB channels.

Due to the rapid proliferation of "open-banded" export equipment (sold as "10-meter" or "multi-norm" radios) that cover wide frequency ranges, Russia allows for two overlapping sets of 3 bands of 40 channels, for a total of 240 channels. 26.515–26.955 MHz, 26.965–27.405 MHz and 27.415–27.855 MHz make up the first set. These are referred to as the "European channels" or the "fives" due to the frequency ending in 5. The second set, known as the "Polish channels" or the "zeros" is 26.510 – 26.950 MHz, 26.960–27.400 MHz and 27.410–27.850 MHz. Multi-norm radios sold in Europe and Asia designed for use in several different countries – with the end-user selecting the "mode" of the country they live in – now come with a "RU" (Russia) mode that opens the radio to full band coverage (usually 25.615–28.305 MHz or 25.615–30.105 MHz). Only 26.515–27.855 / 26.510–27.850 MHz is legally permitted in Russia.

Each channel is given an alphanumeric identifier, with the three bands being labeled B-C-D, then the channel number and the last digit of the frequency labeled "E" for the 5 and "P" for the 0. The final letter(s) indicate the mode (AM or FM). For example, 27.185 MHz AM (Channel 19 in the European/American frequency plan) would be designated "C19EA" or "C19EAM". 27.180 MHz FM (Channel 19 on the Polish assignment) would be designated "C19PF" or "C19PFM". The B-C-D (or "grid") designation comes from common export radio band labeling. Originally these radios would feature 5 bands labeled A-B-C-D-E, with coverage from 26.065 to 28.305 MHz, later these radios switched to a 6 band configuration A-B-D-C-E-F with coverage from 25.615 to 28.305 MHz, making 26.965–27.405 MHz band D instead of band C.

Originally, Russia (and most other Eastern European/CIS countries) used the zero frequency offset in line with the Polish frequency plan (channel 1 being 26.960 MHz). However, in the past 4–5 years, most Russians have switched to the standardized European or American "fives" offset (channel 1 being 26.965 MHz). Due to the use of both frequency plans, many radios sold in the Russian/Eastern European market come with a -5 kHz or +5 kHz switch to quickly change from one channel plan to the other.

== See also ==
- Business band
- Unlicensed Personal Communications Services
