= KDR =

KDR may refer to:

== Aviation ==
- Kandrian Airport, Papua New Guinea (IATA:KDR)
- Radioplane KDR Quail, a 1940s target drone

== Organisations ==
- Kappa Delta Rho, an American college fraternity
- Coalition for the Republic, a defunct Polish political party

== Other uses ==
- Karaim language, spoken in the Baltic (ISO 639:kdr)
- Kinase insert domain receptor, a human protein
- Kort Distanse Radio, in Scandinavia
- Kill-death ratio, a gaming statistic
