= Motorola Talkabout =

Product line of two-way radios

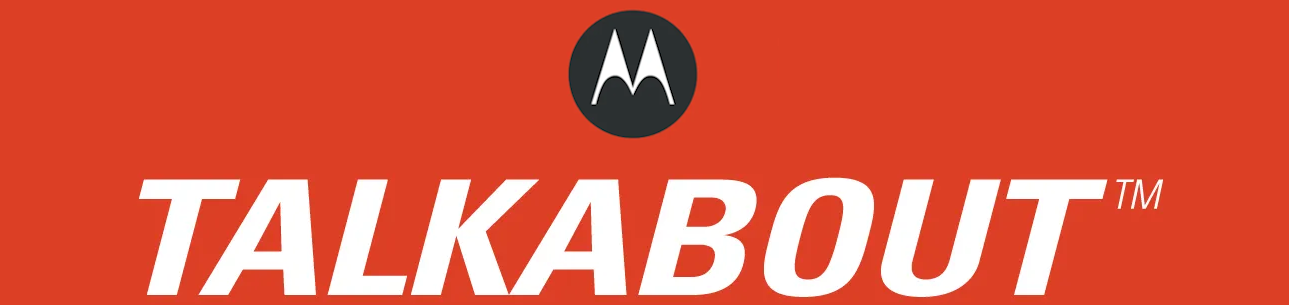

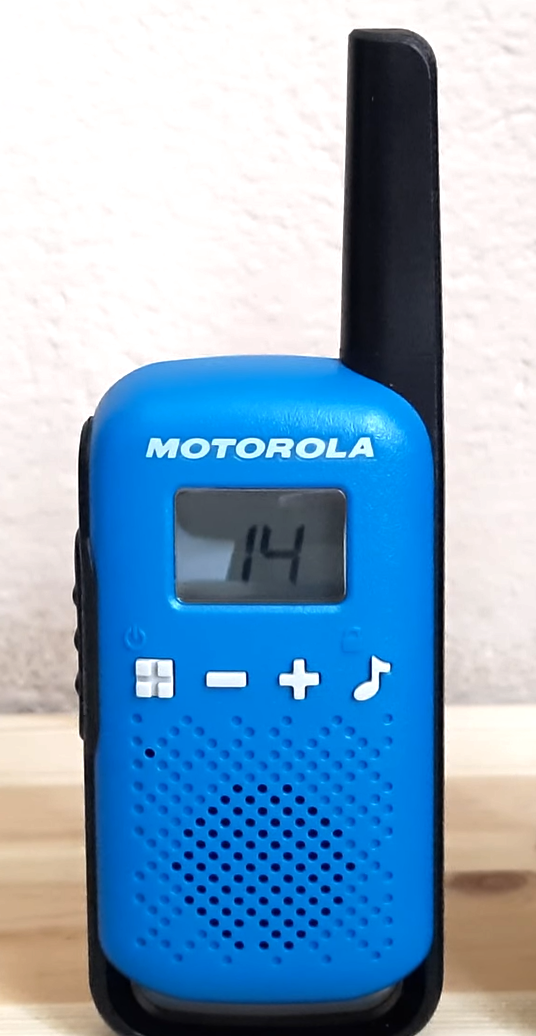
- Talkabout T42 (PMR446 network), released c. 2019
- Also known as: Motorola TLKR; MOTOTLKR
- Manufacturer: Motorola Solutions (formerly Motorola until the company's 2011 split)
- Type: Two-way radios (1997-present); Mobile devices (1999-2003)
- Lifespan: 1997–present
- Connectivity: FRS, GMRS, PMR446

The Motorola Talkabout (stylized TALKABOUT), also known as Motorola TLKR in some regions, are a line of consumer-oriented walkie-talkies produced by Motorola Solutions. Operating on license-free networks and designed for families and recreational activities, they have been one of the most successful product lines of two-way radios. It is currently the only consumer-oriented product line of Motorola Solutions; other Motorola consumer products are offered by Motorola Mobility.

== Product history ==
Talkabout T4500 (FRS/GMRS network), released c. 2003. PMR446 version is known as the T4502

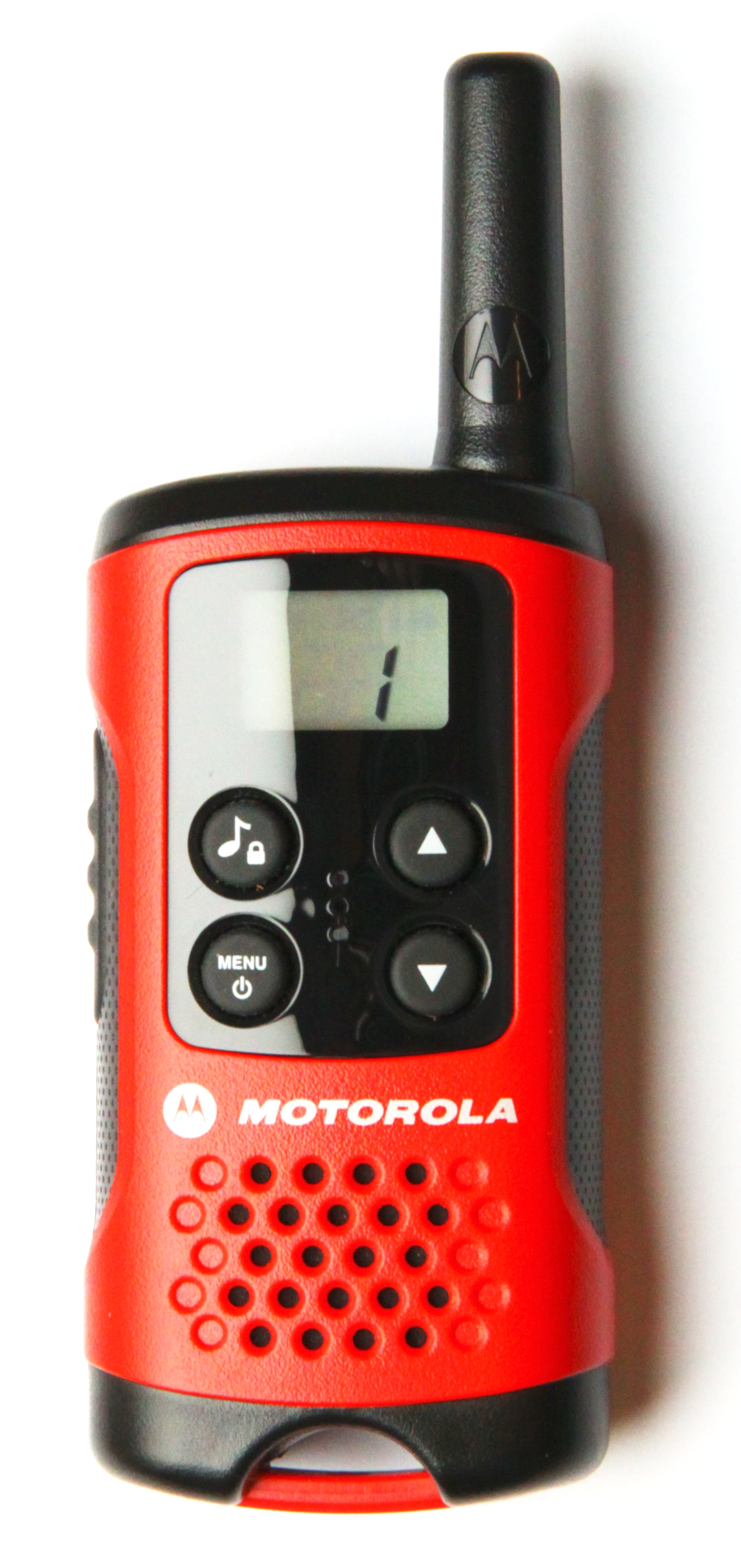
TLKR T40 (PMR446) or Talkabout T100 (FRS), released c. 2015

The Talkabout line was first released in 1997 targeting families and young buyers with two-way radios. Designed to work on the Family Radio Service (FRS) and PMR446 frequencies, it was initially offered in a regular TalkAbout model and a Talkabout Plus model. In July 1998, the TalkAbout SLK series were announced, also for the FRS. In March 1999, the TalkAbout 200 was launched. These would also launch in European territories being able to operate freely on the selected frequencies.

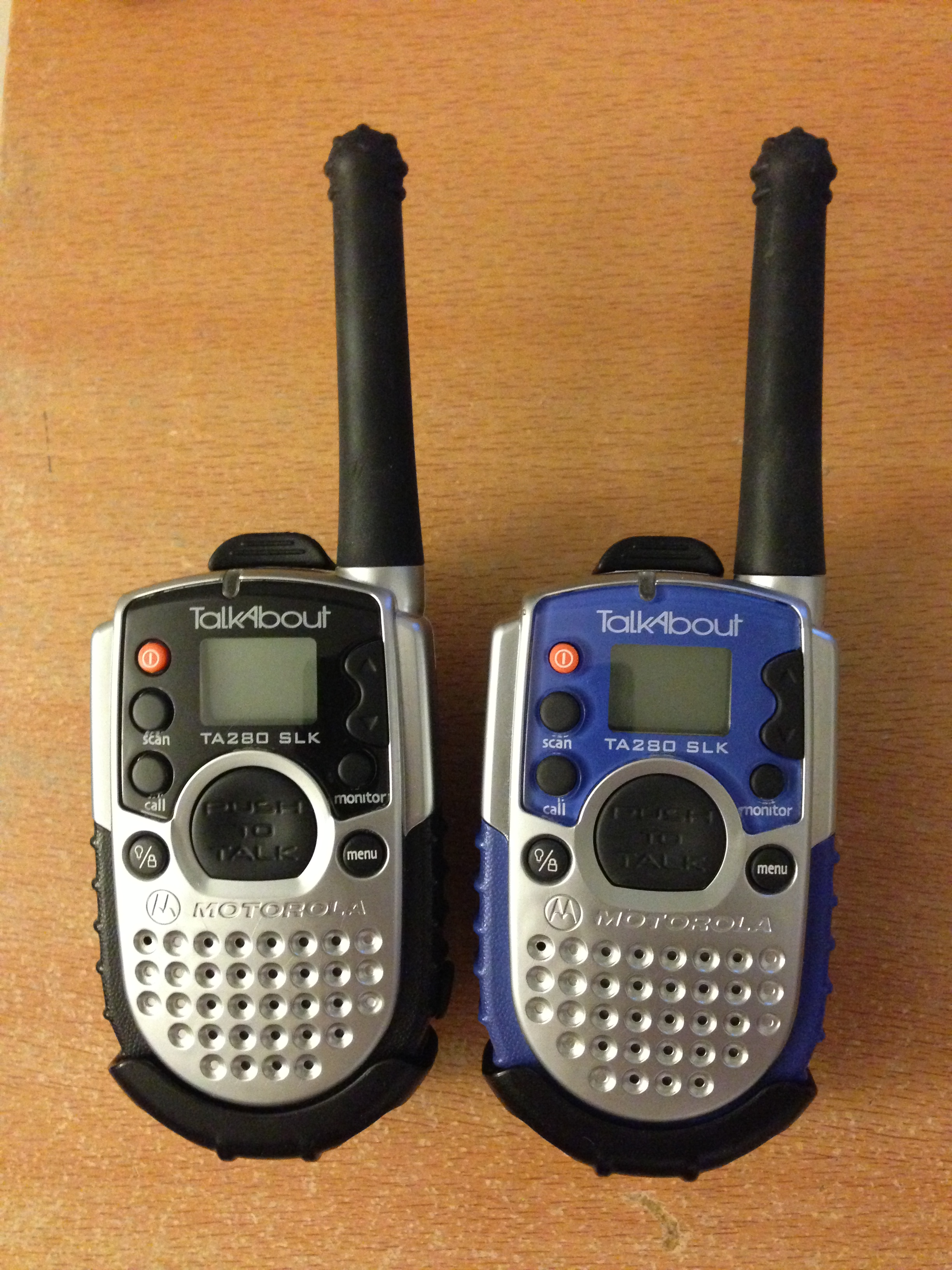
Talkabout TA280 (for FRS network), released c. 1999

The Talkabout 250 became one of the most famed walkie talkies during the boom of the walkie-talkie in the late 1990s, before the expansion of cell phones.

In September 1999, Motorola introduced the TalkAbout T289, with advertized new features being a channel busy indicator and hands-free use. In May 2000, FRS two ray radios FR50 and FR60 were launched.

On August 1, 2000, Motorola introduced the TalkAbout T6300 rugged two-way radio series. It has a digital compass, altimeter, barometer, clock, alarm, timer, and gets national weather alerts from NOAA.

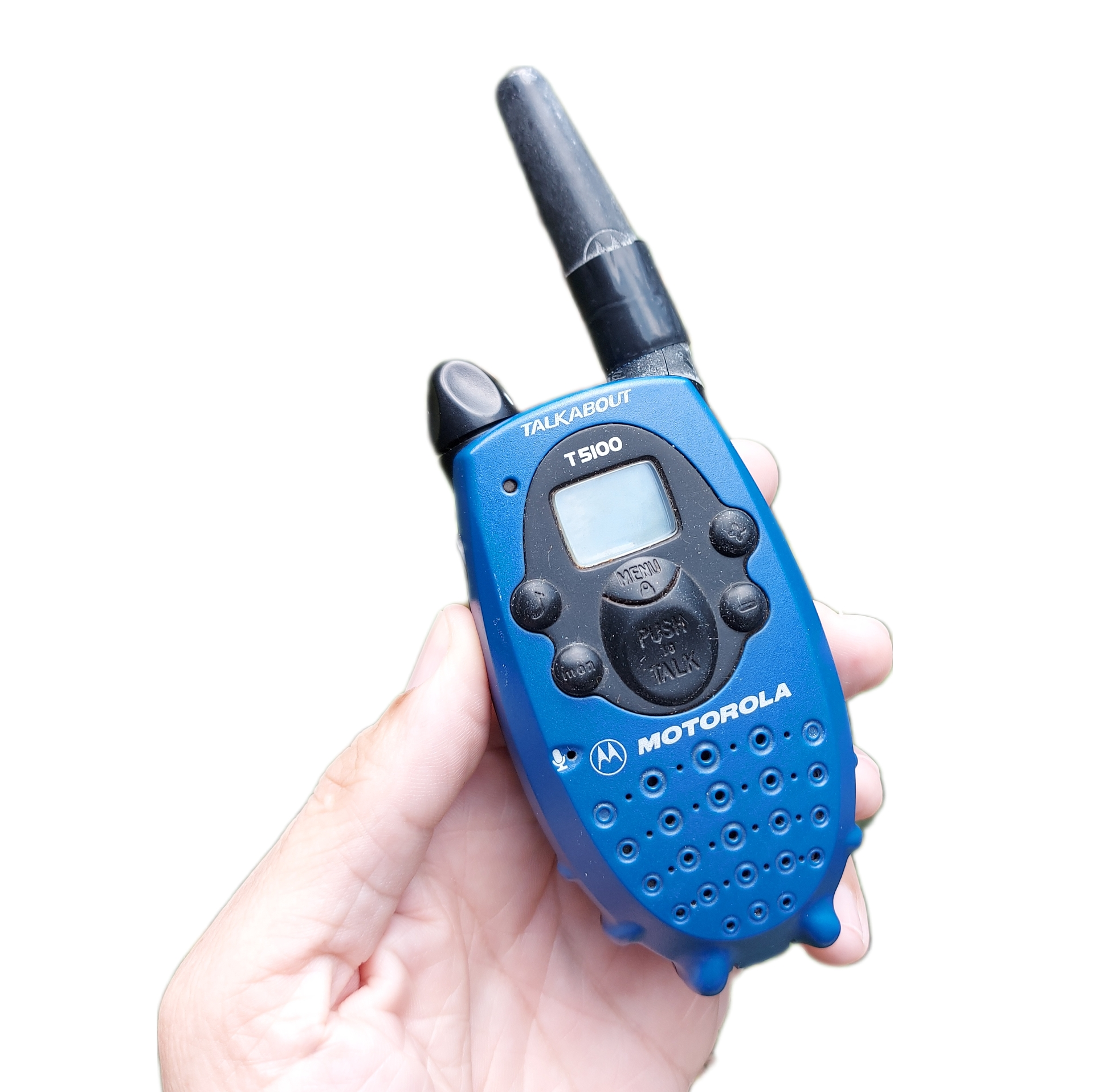
Motorola Talkabout T5100 radio (FRS network), released c. 2007

Motorola also released a model that works with Specific Area Message Encoding (SAME) technology that was released in 2007.

The Motorola TLKR lineup was introduced in 2007 and exclusively operates on PMR446, designed for European and Asian markets. Some models of the TLKR series are also branded as Talkabout for FRS/GMRS models. In late 2018, with the introduction of the Talkabout T82, Motorola Solutions retired the TLKR brand and unified the Talkabout name globally.

In 2011, the fully waterproof MS350R was introduced. In 2013, Motorola launched the Talkabout MU350R, the first consumer FRS/GMRS radio with Bluetooth. On the other hands, the MG series (MG160A and MG167A) became new entry-level radios with a range of 16 miles and coming in bright colors. In October 2014, Motorola Solutions announced that the Talkabout will begin selling in Latin American markets.

Talkabout T82 was released in July 2017 replacing the Motorola TLKR T80. In October 2018, the Talkabout T800 was announced as the first Talkabout walkie-talkie with a smartphone app which connects via Bluetooth and effectively uses the T800 as a modem to send messages and locations over the radio frequencies while outside a cellular zone.

In 2025, ZDNet called the Motorola Talkabout T800 the "best overall walkie-talkie", and noted the 35 miles long range, long battery life, and app connection.

== Non-walkie-talkie products ==
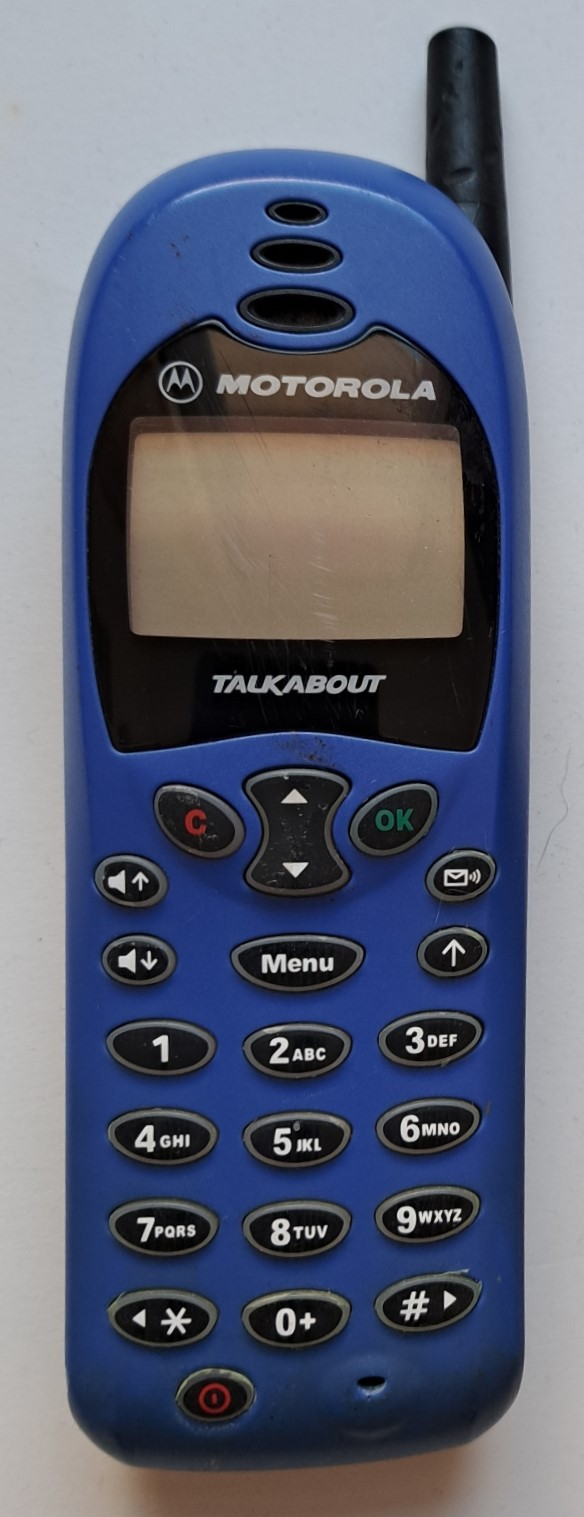
Motorola Talkabout T180 GSM cell phone from 2000

In its earlier years, Motorola also used the brand name on some consumer pagers and cell phones. In 1999 it launched the TalkAbout T340, a small text pager, and the T8090/T8097 dual mode TDMA phones and T8160/T8167 CDMA phones, based on the StarTAC.

In June 2000, Motorola released the Talkabout T900, their first two-way messaging product. These clamshell style e-mail pagers were sold for $99 after a $50 rebate and were similar to the BlackBerry Inter@ctive Pager, but targeted a young audience and came in various colors. In 2001 in a partnership with Microsoft, MSN services like Hotmail became available on the Talkabout T900. By July 2001, 1 million T900 pagers had been sold.
