= Multi-Use Radio Service =

Type of two-way radio service

In the United States, the Multi-Use Radio Service (MURS) is licensed by rule (i.e. under part 95, subpart J, of title 47, Code of Federal Regulations) two-way radio service similar to the Citizens band (CB). Established by the U.S. Federal Communications Commission in the fall of 2000, MURS created a radio service allowing for licensed by rule (Part 95) operation in a narrow selection of the VHF band, with a power limit of 2 watts. The FCC formally defines MURS as "a private, two-way, short-distance voice or data communications service for personal or business activities of the general public." MURS stations may not be connected to the public telephone network, may not be used for store and forward operations, and radio repeaters are not permitted.

In 2009, Industry Canada (IC) established a five-year transition plan, which would have permitted the use of MURS in Canada starting June 2014. In August 2014 IC announced a deferral of MURS introduction, as "the Department does not feel that the introduction of MURS devices in Canada is warranted at this time, and has decided to defer the introduction of MURS devices in Canada until a clearer indication of actual need is provided by Canadian MURS advocates and/or stakeholders ..."

== Eligibility ==
No licenses are required or issued for MURS within the United States.

Any person is authorized to use the MURS frequencies given that it:
- Is not a foreign government or a representative of a foreign government.
- Uses the transmitter in accordance with 47 CFR. 95.1309.
- Operates in accordance with the rules contained in Sections 95.1301-95.1309.
- Operates only legal, type-accepted MURS equipment.

== Frequencies ==
MURS comprises the following five frequencies:

Channel	Frequency	Maximum authorized bandwidth	Channel name
1	151.82 MHz	11.25 kHz	MURS 1
2	151.88 MHz	11.25 kHz	MURS 2
3	151.94 MHz	11.25 kHz	MURS 3
4	154.57 MHz	20.00 kHz	Blue Dot
5	154.60 MHz	20.00 kHz	Green Dot

Channels 1–3 must use "narrowband" frequency modulation (2.5 kHz deviation; 11.25 kHz bandwidth). Channels 4 and 5 may use either "wideband" FM (5 kHz deviation; 20 kHz bandwidth) or "narrowband" FM. All five channels may use amplitude modulation with a bandwidth up to 8 kHz. MURS falls under part 95 and was not mandated for narrow-banding, such as those of Part 90 in the public service bands by January 2013.

Because previous business band licensees who have maintained their active license remain grandfathered with their existing operating privileges, it is possible to find repeaters or other operations not authorized by Part 95 taking place. These are not necessarily illegal. If legal, such operations may enjoy primary status on their licensed frequency and as such are legally protected from harmful interference by MURS users.

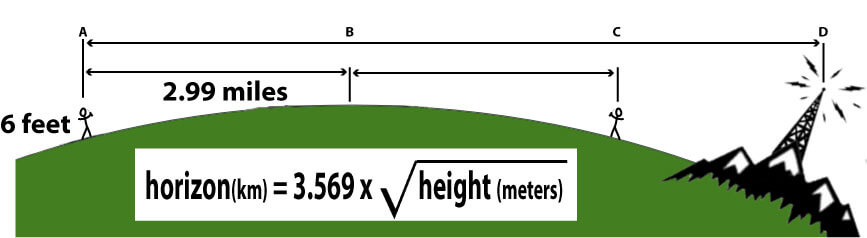
Calculating the horizon distance based on antenna height

== Range ==
MURS range will vary, depending on antenna size and placement. With an external antenna, ranges of 10 miles (16 km) or more can be expected. Since MURS radios use frequencies in the VHF business band, they are subject to obstructions in line of sight, which includes the curvature of the Earth. The higher you can place the antennas on both transmit and receive sides (within legal limits), the further you can transmit and receive. Some antenna manufacturers claim an external antenna can increase the effective radiated power of a transmitter by a factor of 4.

== Authorized modes ==
Designator	Common name
A1D	Amplitude modulation; on–off keyed or quantized; no modulation; Data, telemetry, telecommand
A2B	Amplitude modulation; Digital, with modulation; Telegraphy for machine copy (RTTY, fast Morse)
A2D	Amplitude modulation; Digital, with modulation; Data, telemetry, telecommand
A3E	Amplitude modulation; Single analog channel; Telephony, voice, sound broadcasting
F2B	Angle modulation, straight FM; Digital, with modulation; Telegraphy for machine copy (RTTY, fast Morse)
F1D	Angle modulation, straight FM; on–off keyed or quantized; Data, telemetry, telecommand
F2D	Angle modulation, straight FM; Digital, with modulation; Data, telemetry, telecommand
F3E	Angle modulation, straight FM; Single analog channel; Telephony, voice, sound broadcasting
G3E	Angle modulation, phase modulation; Single analog channel; Telephony, voice, sound broadcasting

== Permitted areas of operation ==
MURS operation is authorized anywhere a CB radio station is authorized and within or over any area of the world where radio services are regulated by the FCC. Those areas are within the territorial limits of:

- The fifty United States
- The District of Columbia
- American Samoa (seven islands)
- Baker Island
- Caribbean Insular areas
- Commonwealth of Northern Mariana Islands
- Commonwealth of Puerto Rico
- Guam Island
- Howland Island
- Jarvis Island
- Johnston Atoll (Islets East, Johnston, North and Sand)
- Kingman Reef
- Midway Atoll (Islets Eastern and Sand)
- Navassa Island
- Pacific Insular areas
- Palmyra Atoll (more than fifty islets)
- United States Virgin Islands (50 islets and cays)
- Wake Island
- Aboard any vessel of the United States, with the permission of the captain, while the vessel is traveling either domestically or in international waters

== Restrictions ==
- Transmitter power output is limited to 2 watts.
- The highest point of any MURS antenna must not be more than 18.3 meters (60 feet) above the ground or 6.10 meters (20.0 feet) above the highest point of the structure to which it is mounted, whichever is higher.
- Transmitting on MURS frequencies is not allowed while aboard aircraft in flight.
- Devices that use MURS must be specially labeled and certified.

== Products ==
There are a wide variety of radio products that use MURS frequencies. MURS devices include wireless base station intercoms, handheld two-way radios, wireless dog training collars, wireless public address units, customer service callboxes, wireless remote switches, and wireless callboxes with or without gate opening ability.

Since MURS uses standard frequencies, most devices that use MURS are compatible with each other.

Most analog two-way radios utilize a technology called CTCSS or DCS that helps block out unwanted transmissions. To make MURS two-way radios work together, they must have matching CTCSS or DCS tones. This can usually be done via basic programming which almost all MURS two-way radios support.

The goTenna, a digital radio product, operates on the MURS band and pairs with smartphones to enable users to send texts and share locations on a peer-to-peer basis. goTenna is not interoperable with other MURS devices, even though they operate on the same spectrum, employing "listen-before-talk" to reduce interference in the band's five channels.

== Notable users ==
According to Bill Fawcett's Spaniel Journal, Spaniel pro-handler Dan Langhans was given a set of VHF business-band radios on the frequency of 154.57 MHz which became known by the trade as "blue dot" radios.

Costco Wholesale use Motorola DTR600, DLR1020, and Motorola Curve on Frequency 1 for general use among employees and Frequency 2 for communication with major sales departments. Walmart and Sam's Club use a Motorola Solutions model Motorola RDM2070D, which is exclusive to Walmart and Sam's Club. The Motorola RDM2070D is preprogrammed on MURS frequencies with most channels using CTCSS tone 21/4Z/136.5Hz.

== See also ==
- Business band
- Family Radio Service
- General Mobile Radio Service
- Public Radio Service
- Unlicensed Personal Communications Services
