= UHF CB =

Citizen's band radio service

UHF CB is a class-licensed citizen's band radio service authorised by the governments of Australia, Europe, Malaysia, New Zealand, Singapore, Vanuatu, and in the PMR446, UHF 477 MHz band. UHF CB provides 77 channels, including 32 channels (16 output, 16 input) allocated to repeater stations. It is similar in concept to the General Mobile Radio Service in the United States.

== Equipment ==
User equipment designs are similar to commercial land mobile two-way radio, except the maximum legal output power is 5 Watts. External antennas are permitted and commercially manufactured antennas have gains as high as 12 dB. Handheld transceivers (handy talkies) are permitted and have transmit power from 500 mW to 5 W (full legal power) and are relatively cheap compared to full-sized transceivers. Operation in the band is restricted to modes F3E and G3E (FM or PM of analogue voice telephony) except for channels 22 and 23, which are data modes only.

== Licensing ==
=== Australia ===
In Australia, class licensing means that users do not have to apply for a licence or pay a licence fee; however, they must comply with the regulations of the class licence.

It is illegal to use non-standard radios purchased from outside Australia because they may interfere with licensed land-mobile services. This includes overseas personal radio service devices because they do not share the same band plan, power output and channels as UHF CB. Care must be taken when importing radios from overseas to ensure they comply with local regulations. Approved radios are identified by the Regulatory Compliance Mark (RCM) label, usually found on the rear panel of the equipment.

== Scan ==
Many UHF CB radios allow the user to scan channels to find a conversation. Several different scan modes may be provided:

Open Scan scans all 80 channels to find an active conversation. Some radios allow skipping selected channels when scanning.

Group Scan scans a small number of selected channels. For example, a caravanner travelling around the country may choose to group scan Channel 40 (Road Channel), 18 (Caravan Channel) and 5 (Emergency Channel) so they will hear any conversations relating to their travels.

Priority Scan allows selection of a "priority" channel whilst scanning a handful of selected channels. This could be useful, for example, in a convoy of vehicles: convoy members can set their chosen convoy channel as a "priority" whilst scanning the designated road channel for traffic updates etc. If a convoy member speaks, the radio will switch back to the priority channel even if someone is speaking on another channel.

== Selcall ==
Selective calling (Selcall) allows a radio to call another radio using a sequence of tones, usually presented to the user as a series of 5 numbers. UHF CB radios can be set to be completely silent until they receive a series of tones matching a pre-programmed sequence. Radios which have this feature usually indicate that a call has been received by emitting a number of beeps and by opening the squelch. The popularity of selcall has dropped since the introduction of CTCSS.

== CTCSS ==
Continuous tone coded squelch system (CTCSS) allows a group of radios set with the same tone to converse on a channel without hearing other radios using that channel. CTCSS can be used to silence a radio until another radio with the same tone transmits. This allows monitoring of a channel for transmissions from radios set with the same tone without hearing other conversations that use different or even no tone.

The use of CTCSS is not permitted on UHF CB repeaters or the designated emergency channels.

== Repeaters ==
Repeaters extend the range of transmission by receiving and automatically rebroadcasting a transmission using an antenna located in a high location, normally the top of a mountain, tall building or radio tower. Sometimes a transmission range of over 100 kilometres (60 miles) can be achieved through the use of a repeater. Repeaters are on channels 1–8 and 41–48 and the duplex button should be pressed to access the repeater. All repeaters can be used by anyone, except for channel 5 repeaters, which are for emergencies only.

== Signage ==
It is common practice to install signs at worksites, roadworks, regional highways, national parks, heavy vehicle checking stations, and on the rear of camper vans and caravans to advertise a UHF channel for communications. For example, during the widening of the M1 Pacific Motorway between Sydney and Newcastle, contractors installed "UHF 29" signs at the entry point of each worksite.

== Channel use ==
=== Legally restricted channels ===
The following channels are legislated as a part of the ACMA UHF CB Class Licence.

- Channel 5 and 35 are the designated emergency channels in Australia, Vanuatu and Malaysia, and are not to be used except in an emergency. Making an emergency call involves switching the radio to Channel 5 with duplex on, and trying again with duplex off if there's no response. Some areas in Australia may not have someone monitoring channels 5 and 35. As well as private monitors, there are monitoring groups in Australia, notably, Radio Rescue Emergency Communications Inc., Australia Citizens Radio Monitors, South East Queensland Emergency Service Team, Citizens Radio Emergency Service Team South Australia, Citizens Radio Emergency Service Team Victoria, Citizens Radio Emergency Service Team New South Wales and Citizens Radio Emergency Service Team Queensland. In New Zealand channels 5 and 35 are not emergency channels but are available for general use in duplex (repeater) mode. In New Zealand, if you use UHF PRS for emergencies, you rely on someone listening on the same channel, and should scan all channels for activity before requesting assistance.
- Channel 9 is the designated emergency channel in Malaysia.
- Channel 11 is the 'call channel' and is only to be used for initiating calls with another person, who should quickly organise another vacant channel to continue their discussion, unlike New Zealand which uses channel 11 as its main trucking channel.
- Channel 22 and 23 are only to be used for telemetry and telecommand. Packet data and voice transmission are not allowed.
- Channel 61, 62 and 63 are reserved for future allocation and transmission on these channels is not allowed.

=== Channels used by consensus ===
The following channels are not legislated as a part of the class licence however are used for the following purposes by consensus.

- Channel 10 is typically used by 4WD clubs when in a convoy and in national parks. This channel is used to avoid interfering with road safety communications on channel 29 or 40. If you are not in a convoy it is recommended that only 29 or 40 are used, depending on the road in question.
- Channel 18 is the campers and caravan convoy channel typically used by travellers.
- Channel 29 is the road safety channel on the M1 Pacific Motorway and Highway between Tweed Heads and Newcastle in NSW. It is used due to one transport company who travelled this road who always used this channel. Other drivers switched from 40 to 29 to talk to them and it became a custom. This custom prevails even though the original transport company no longer exists.
- Channel 40 is the primary road safety channel Australia-wide, most commonly used by trucks including pilot/escort vehicles for oversized loads.

Users should be aware that UHF CB channels 31 to 38 and 71 to 78 are the 'input' channels for repeaters. Users should avoid using these channels to avoid interfering with repeaters. If a repeater is to be used, switch to 1–8 or 41–48 and press the duplex button.

== UHF CB band plan ==
=== Expansion to 80 channels ===
On 27 May 2011 the channel spacing on Australian UHF CB was changed, allowing the band to expand from 40 channels to 80 channels. This was achieved by reducing the bandwidth of the existing channels and interleaving new channels between them, reducing channel spacing from 25kHz to 12.5kHz. The expansion effectively allows the use of 77 channels. Channels 61, 62 and 63 are reserved, as the existing data channels 22 and 23 retain a 25 kHz bandwidth, and therefore overlap with the three reserved channels.

ACMA originally intended to make older 40 channel UHF radios on the 25 kHz spacing illegal to use from June 2017. However, in February 2017, it reversed this decision after determining that the two systems were working well alongside each other.

=== Current UHF CB band plan (80 Channels) ===
General chat channels are used in simplex mode, repeater channels must be used in duplex mode. If you are not using a repeater it is recommended to choose a "general chat" channel.

| Channel Name: | Frequency: | Purpose: | Frequency Spacing: |
|---|---|---|---|
| Channel 1 | 476.4250 | Repeater Channel | 12.5 kHz |
| Channel 2 | 476.4500 | Repeater Channel | 12.5 kHz |
| Channel 3 | 476.4750 | Repeater Channel | 12.5 kHz |
| Channel 4 | 476.5000 | Repeater Channel | 12.5 kHz |
| Channel 5 | 476.5250 | Emergency Repeater Output (not an emergency channel in New Zealand) | 12.5 kHz |
| Channel 6 | 476.5500 | Repeater Channel | 12.5 kHz |
| Channel 7 | 476.5750 | Repeater Channel | 12.5 kHz |
| Channel 8 | 476.6000 | Repeater Channel | 12.5 kHz |
| Channel 9 | 476.6250 | General Chat Channel (sometimes also used by firies) | 12.5 kHz |
| Channel 10 | 476.6500 | 4WD Clubs or Convoys and National Parks. Also one-way track channel, Simpson desert channel and outback channel. | 12.5 kHz |
| Channel 11 | 476.6750 | Call Channel (main trucking channel in New Zealand) | 12.5 kHz |
| Channel 12 | 476.7000 | General Chat Channel | 12.5 kHz |
| Channel 13 | 476.7250 | General Chat Channel | 12.5 kHz |
| Channel 14 | 476.7500 | General Chat Channel | 12.5 kHz |
| Channel 15 | 476.7750 | General Chat Channel | 12.5 kHz |
| Channel 16 | 476.8000 | General Chat Channel | 12.5 kHz |
| Channel 17 | 476.8250 | General Chat Channel | 12.5 kHz |
| Channel 18 | 476.8500 | Caravanners and Campers Convoy Channel | 12.5 kHz |
| Channel 19 | 476.8750 | General Chat Channel | 12.5 kHz |
| Channel 20 | 476.9000 | General Chat Channel (sometimes also motorhome channel) | 12.5 kHz |
| Channel 21 | 476.9250 | General Chat Channel | 12.5 kHz |
| Channel 22 | 476.9500 | Telemetry and Telecommand Only (No Voice or Data) | 25 kHz |
| Channel 23 | 476.9750 | Telemetry and Telecommand Only (No Voice or Data) | 25 kHz |
| Channel 24 | 477.0000 | General Chat Channel | 12.5 kHz |
| Channel 25 | 477.0250 | General Chat Channel | 12.5 kHz |
| Channel 26 | 477.0500 | General Chat Channel | 12.5 kHz |
| Channel 27 | 477.0750 | General Chat Channel | 12.5 kHz |
| Channel 28 | 477.1000 | General Chat Channel | 12.5 kHz |
| Channel 29 | 477.1250 | Road Safety Channel Pacific Hwy/Mwy between Brisbane (QLD) and Sydney (NSW) and normal channel in New Zealand | 12.5 kHz |
| Channel 30 | 477.1500 | UHF CB Broadcasts, Weather etc | 12.5 kHz |
| Channel 31 | 477.1750 | Repeater Input | 12.5 kHz |
| Channel 32 | 477.2000 | Repeater Input | 12.5 kHz |
| Channel 33 | 477.2250 | Repeater Input | 12.5 kHz |
| Channel 34 | 477.2500 | Repeater Input | 12.5 kHz |
| Channel 35 | 477.2750 | Emergency Repeater Input (not an emergency channel in New Zealand) | 12.5 kHz |
| Channel 36 | 477.3000 | Repeater Input | 12.5 kHz |
| Channel 37 | 477.3250 | Repeater Input | 12.5 kHz |
| Channel 38 | 477.3500 | Repeater Input | 12.5 kHz |
| Channel 39 | 477.3750 | General Chat Channel | 12.5 kHz |
| Channel 40 | 477.4000 | Road Safety Channel Australia Wide | 12.5 kHz |
| Channel 41 | 476.4375 | Repeater Channel | 12.5 kHz |
| Channel 42 | 476.4625 | Repeater Channel | 12.5 kHz |
| Channel 43 | 476.4875 | Repeater Channel | 12.5 kHz |
| Channel 44 | 476.5125 | Repeater Channel | 12.5 kHz |
| Channel 45 | 476.5375 | Repeater Channel | 12.5 kHz |
| Channel 46 | 476.5625 | Repeater Channel | 12.5 kHz |
| Channel 47 | 476.5875 | Repeater Channel | 12.5 kHz |
| Channel 48 | 476.6125 | Repeater Channel | 12.5 kHz |
| Channel 49 | 476.6375 | General Chat Channel | 12.5 kHz |
| Channel 50 | 476.6625 | General Chat Channel | 12.5 kHz |
| Channel 51 | 476.6875 | General Chat Channel | 12.5 kHz |
| Channel 52 | 476.7125 | General Chat Channel | 12.5 kHz |
| Channel 53 | 476.7375 | General Chat Channel | 12.5 kHz |
| Channel 54 | 476.7625 | General Chat Channel | 12.5 kHz |
| Channel 55 | 476.7875 | General Chat Channel | 12.5 kHz |
| Channel 56 | 476.8125 | General Chat Channel | 12.5 kHz |
| Channel 57 | 476.8375 | General Chat Channel | 12.5 kHz |
| Channel 58 | 476.8625 | General Chat Channel | 12.5 kHz |
| Channel 59 | 476.8875 | General Chat Channel | 12.5 kHz |
| Channel 60 | 476.9125 | General Chat Channel | 12.5 kHz |
| Channel 61 | ~~476.9375~~ | Reserved due to bandwidth of data channels 22 & 23 | - |
| Channel 62 | ~~476.9625~~ | Reserved due to bandwidth of data channels 22 & 23 | - |
| Channel 63 | ~~476.9875~~ | Reserved due to bandwidth of data channels 22 & 23 | - |
| Channel 64 | 477.0125 | General Chat Channel | 12.5 kHz |
| Channel 65 | 477.0375 | General Chat Channel | 12.5 kHz |
| Channel 66 | 477.0625 | General Chat Channel | 12.5 kHz |
| Channel 67 | 477.0875 | General Chat Channel | 12.5 kHz |
| Channel 68 | 477.1125 | General Chat Channel | 12.5 kHz |
| Channel 69 | 477.1375 | General Chat Channel | 12.5 kHz |
| Channel 70 | 477.1625 | General Chat Channel | 12.5 kHz |
| Channel 71 | 477.1875 | Repeater Input | 12.5 kHz |
| Channel 72 | 477.2125 | Repeater Input | 12.5 kHz |
| Channel 73 | 477.2375 | Repeater Input | 12.5 kHz |
| Channel 74 | 477.2625 | Repeater Input | 12.5 kHz |
| Channel 75 | 477.2875 | Repeater Input | 12.5 kHz |
| Channel 76 | 477.3125 | Repeater Input | 12.5 kHz |
| Channel 77 | 477.3375 | Repeater Input | 12.5 kHz |
| Channel 78 | 477.3625 | Repeater Input | 12.5 kHz |
| Channel 79 | 477.3875 | General Chat Channel | 12.5 kHz |
| Channel 80 | 477.4125 | General Chat Channel | 12.5 kHz |

== Malaysia ==
On 1 April 2010, the Malaysian Communications and Multimedia Commission (MCMC) introduced PMR446 (446.00625 MHz to 446.093750 MHz and 446.103125 MHz to 446.196875 MHz) in addition to 26.965 MHz to 27.405 MHz as a class assignment. Subsequently, the MCMC revoked 477 MHz personal radio service as a class assignment on 1 January 2022.

== New Zealand ==
New Zealand offers a similar PRS service. New Zealand's Personal Radio Service (PRS) and 26 MHz Citizens Band radio are very similar to Australia's UHF Citizens Band and 27 MHz Citizens Band services.

The New Zealand Government's Ministry of Commerce introduced the UHF PRS in 1996 to allow for freely available short-range wireless communications outside the 26 MHz CB band. The UHF (but not VHF) band was selected due to its ability to withstand atmospheric and groundwave interference unlike the existing 26 MHz allocation.

== See also ==
- Citizens band radio
