= PMR446 =

Licence-free radio in Europe and some Asian territories

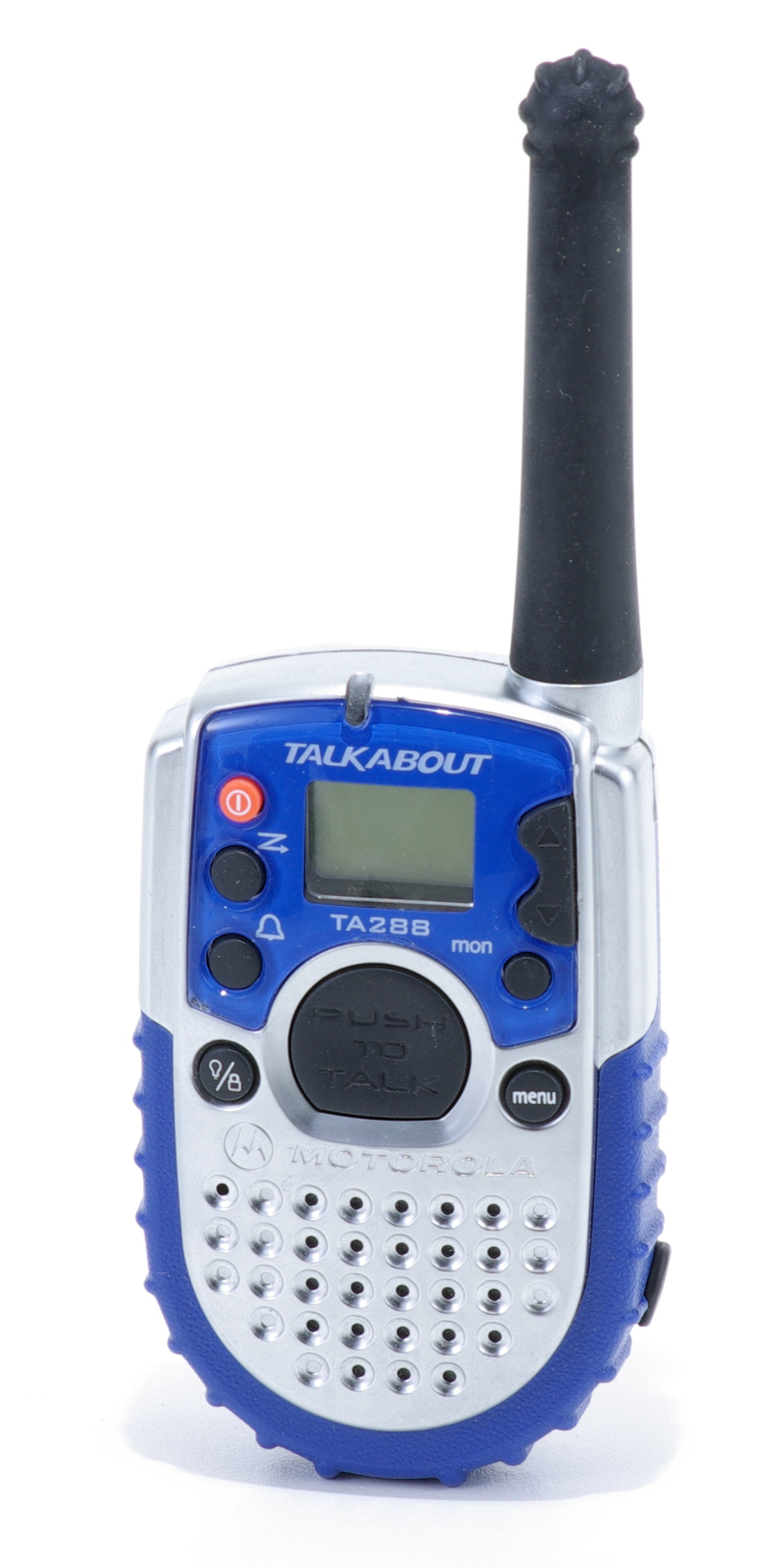
A Motorola Talkabout TA288 walkie-talkie for use on the PMR446 service

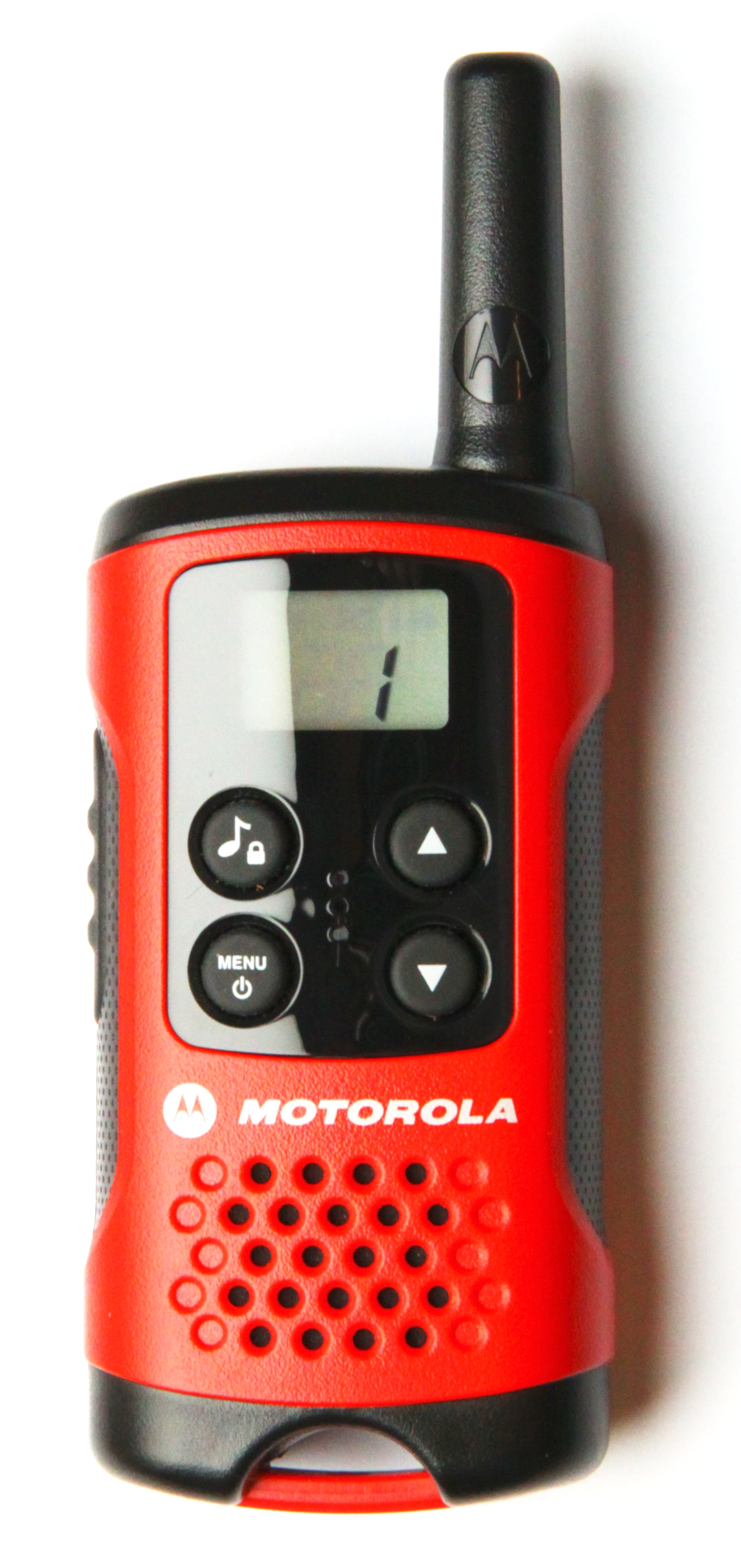
Motorola TLKR T40, a basic PMR446 walkie-talkie. FRS version is known as the Talkabout T100

PMR446 (Private Mobile Radio, 446 MHz) is a licence-exempt personal radio service in the UHF radio frequency band, available for business and personal use throughout the European continent (all CEPT member countries), Malaysia, Singapore, the United Arab Emirates and other territories.

Typically PMR446 is used for both recreational and business use, including small-site, same-building and line of sight outdoor activities. Additionally it has been utilized by amateur-radio operators and radio enthusiasts as a license-free experimental band. Historically, analogue FM is used but a digital voice mode has been available in radios conforming to digital private mobile radio (dPMR446) and digital mobile radio (DMR Tier 1) standards designed by ETSI. Originally 8 channels were available in analogue mode but this has now been increased to 16 channels.

Equipment use ranges from consumer-grade to professional quality walkie-talkies (similar to those used for FRS/GMRS in the United States and Canada). Depending on surrounding terrain, range can vary from a few hundred metres (yards) (in a city) to a few kilometres (miles) (flat countryside) to many kilometres (miles) from high ground.

== History ==
The first steps towards creating licence-free short range radio communications were taken in April 1997 when the European Radio Communications Committee decided on a 446 MHz frequency band to be used for the new radios. In November 1998, ERC Decision (98)25 allocated frequency band 446.000–446.100 MHz for analogue PMR446; another two decisions established licence exemption for PMR446 equipment and free circulation of the PMR446 equipment. The first country which introduced these frequencies for licence-free use was Ireland on 1 April 1998. The United Kingdom introduced PMR446 service in April 1999; since 2003, it has replaced the former short-range business radio (SRBR) service.

In October 2005, ECC Decision (05)02 added unlicensed band 446.1–446.2 MHz for use by digital DMR/dPMR equipment.

In July 2015, ECC Decision (15)05 doubled the number of analog channels to 16 by extending analog operation onto the 446.1–446.2 MHz band previously used by digital DMR/dPMR equipment, effective January 2016; from January 2018, the number of digital channels was doubled by extending onto the 446.0–446.1 MHz band used by analog FM.

== Range ==
Until recently, PMR446 radios were handheld transceivers with fixed antennas (see Technical information). In November 2015, Midland Radio announced the release of the GB1 mobile PMR446 radio for vehicular use.

The range of PMR446, just like any VHF or UHF radio, is dependent on many factors like environment (in-city range is far less than in an open field), height above surrounding obstructions, and, to a lesser extent, weather conditions. The antenna type and location, transmit power and receive sensitivity also affect range. However, with PMR446 most of these variables are fixed at manufacturing to comply with the PMR446 specifications. Most of the time the maximum range that a user in a city can expect is a few hundred metres (yards) or less.

Range may be many kilometres (miles), for example between hilltops, or only a few hundred metres (yards), if for example a hill or large metal object is in the transmission path between radios. The best known long-distance record is 333 mi (536 km) from Blyth in the United Kingdom to Almere, Netherlands. This was the result of enhanced propagation conditions, not a line-of-sight signal.

== Use worldwide ==
PMR446-compliant equipment may be used anywhere throughout Europe, Malaysia, and Singapore. Type approved PMR446 radios with power up to 500 mW can be used without any licence in India and Vietnam. The devices may not be base stations or repeaters, and must use integrated antennas only.

PMR446 radios use frequencies that in Australia, the U.S., and Canada, among some other countries, are allocated to amateur radio operators, and military radar systems. As a result, operating PMR446 radios are strictly forbidden and users can be fined. Instead, the U.S., Canada and Mexico use the Family Radio Service (FRS) system, which provides a similar service on different frequencies, around 462 and 467 MHz. These frequencies are allocated to the emergency services in Europe, notably the fire brigade in the UK, police in Russia and commercial users in Germany and Australia. Interference with licensed radio services may result in prosecution.

Australia, New Zealand, Vanuatu use the UHF Citizen's Band system in the 476–477 MHz range and a maximum power output of 5 W giving improved range over the lower power PMR system.

== Technical information ==
PMR446 covers band 446.0–446.2 MHz. The general ECC decision however still requires integral antennas and the actual implementation varies between different countries.

=== Analogue FM and digital TDMA ===
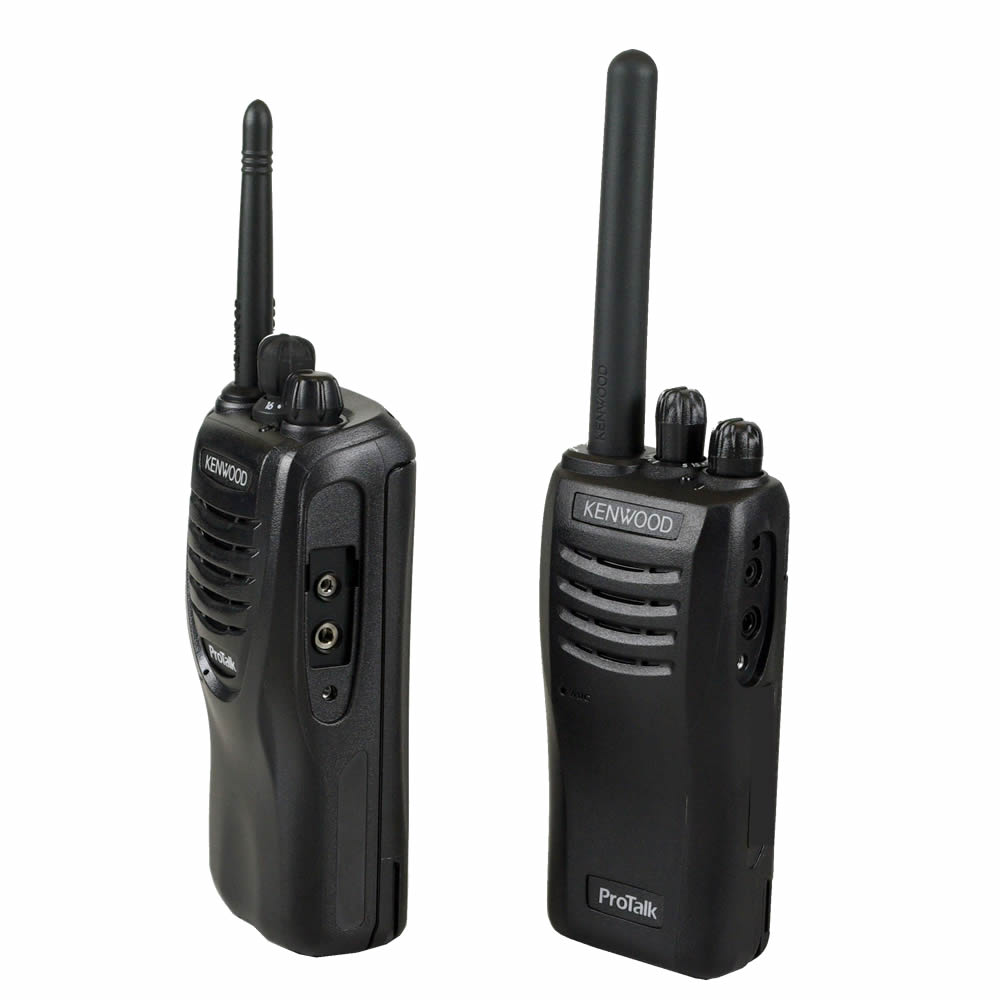
Kenwood TK3301 and TK3501 PMR446 radios

Analogue PMR446 uses 16 FM channels separated by 12.5 kHz from each other. Maximum power is 500 mW ERP and equipment must be used on a mobile basis. CTCSS is usually used, with more upmarket models also featuring DCS and/or fixed-carrier voice inversion. Before January 2016, only the lower 8 channels were allowed for analog FM operation.

For those older PMR446 radios with 39 codes, the codes 0 to 38 are CTCSS Tones:

PMR446 CTCSS Privacy Codes
Code	Tone Hz	Code	Tone Hz	Code	Tone Hz
0	Off	13	103.5	26	162.2
1	67.0	14	107.2	27	167.9
2	71.9	15	110.9	28	173.8
3	74.4	16	114.8	29	179.9
4	77.0	17	118.8	30	186.2
5	79.7	18	123.0	31	192.8
6	82.5	19	127.3	32	203.5
7	85.4	20	131.8	33	210.7
8	88.5	21	136.5	34	218.1
9	91.5	22	141.3	35	225.7
10	94.8	23	146.2	36	233.6
11	97.4	24	151.4	37	241.8
12	100.0	25	156.7	38	250.3

For those newer PMR446 radios with 122 codes, codes 0 to 38 are as above while codes 39 to 121 are DCS codes:

DCS
Code	DCS	Code	DCS	Code	DCS
39	023	67	174	95	445
40	025	68	205	96	464
41	026	69	223	97	465
42	031	70	226	98	466
43	032	71	243	99	503
44	043	72	244	100	506
45	047	73	245	101	516
46	051	74	251	102	532
47	054	75	261	103	546
48	065	76	263	104	565
49	071	77	265	105	606
50	072	78	271	106	612
51	073	79	306	107	624
52	074	80	311	108	627
53	114	81	315	109	631
54	115	82	331	110	632
55	116	83	343	111	654
56	125	84	346	112	662
57	131	85	351	113	664
58	132	86	364	114	703
59	134	87	365	115	712
60	143	88	371	116	723
61	152	89	411	117	731
62	155	90	412	118	732
63	156	91	413	119	734
64	162	92	423	120	743
65	165	93	431	121	754
66	172	94	432		

Digital PMR446 DMR Tier I (TDMA) uses 16 digital voice channels separated by 12.5 kHz from each other with 4-level FSK modulation at 3.6 kbit/s. Before January 2018, only the higher 8 channels were allowed for digital TDMA operation.

Some Digital PMR446 radios (Hytera BD305LF, Retevis RT40, ...) support Dual Capacity Direct Mode (DCDM), which allows for the use of two timeslots during simplex (radio-to-radio) communication. This effectively doubles the channel capacity by allowing two simultaneous transmissions on one channel.

Color Code (0 to 16) is the equivalent of CTCSS for digital. It's used to isolate a population of users (a company, an association, a family, ...).

By convention CC1 is used for public contact.

TalkGroups are used to separate groups of users (ex: TG1 for direction and TG2 for room service in a hotel using channel 12 CC7).

By contacting a specific TG, each user subscribing to this TG will hear you (Group Call).

A user can subscribe to many TGs (RX Group List).

It is also possible to contact all users in your color code (All Call).

Radio ID One for each user, to be contacted directly (Private Call).

Analogue (NFM) and digital TDMA (DMR)
Channel	Frequency (MHz)	Channel Spacing (kHz)	Channel Spacing Known As	Comments (Channel/CTCSS)
1	446.00625	12.5	Narrow [NFM]	FM: Emergency communication (1/12) FM: Trucker (1/9) FM: Baby monitor (1/0) FM: Children's channel (1/10)
2	446.01875	12.5	Narrow [NFM]	FM: Geocaching FM: Camping FM: Mountain (German-speaking countries)
3	446.03125	12.5	Narrow [NFM]	FM: Prepper Channel (3/1), in disasters FM: Bicycle, Mountain bike FM: Mountain (Poland) (3/14)
4	446.04375	12.5	Narrow [NFM]	FM: Drone-Pilot Intercom (4/14) FM: 4WD (4/4) FM: Boat (4/16)
5	446.05625	12.5	Narrow [NFM]	FM: Scouts (5/5)
6	446.06875	12.5	Narrow [NFM]	FM: Event Channel FM: Hunters (6/12) FM: Fisherman FM: Inland sailing (Poland) (6/16) FM: Free Radio Network (6/20)
7	446.08125	12.5	Narrow [NFM]	FM: Mountain (7/7). Mountaineers in Spain propose using channel 7 subtone 7 for mountain safety.
8	446.09375	12.5	Narrow [NFM]	FM: DX & Calling Channel (8/8) FM: Distress, European emergency channel FM: Mountain - Hill Walking Radio Network (Ireland) (8) FM: Mountain (Italy) (8/16)
9	446.10625	12.5	Narrow [NFM]	DMR: Digital Calling Channel (CC1 TG99) DMR: Distress (CC1 TG9112), EmCOMM other channel with same TG FM: AIRSOFT
10	446.11875	12.5	Narrow [NFM]	FM: Fox Hunting, A.R.D.F.
11	446.13125	12.5	Narrow [NFM]	
12	446.14375	12.5	Narrow [NFM]	
13	446.15625	12.5	Narrow [NFM]	
14	446.16875	12.5	Narrow [NFM]	
15	446.18125	12.5	Narrow [NFM]	
16	446.19375	12.5	Narrow [NFM]	

=== Digital FDMA ===
Digital PMR446 dPMR (FDMA) uses 32 digital voice channels separated by 6.25 kHz from each other with 4-level FSK modulation at 3.6 kbit/s. Before January 2018, only the upper 16 channels were allowed for digital FDMA operation.

Digital FDMA (dPMR446)
Channel	Frequency (MHz)	Channel Spacing (kHz)	Comments
1	446.003125	6.25	
2	446.009375	6.25	
3	446.015625	6.25	
4	446.021875	6.25	
5	446.028125	6.25	
6	446.034375	6.25	
7	446.040625	6.25	
8	446.046875	6.25	
9	446.053125	6.25	
10	446.059375	6.25	
11	446.065625	6.25	
12	446.071875	6.25	
13	446.078125	6.25	
14	446.084375	6.25	
15	446.090625	6.25	
16	446.096875	6.25	
17	446.103125	6.25	
18	446.109375	6.25	
19	446.115625	6.25	dPMR => Calling Channel (CC1 TG99) dPMR => Mutual assistance (CC1 TG9112)
20	446.121875	6.25	
21	446.128125	6.25	
22	446.134375	6.25	
23	446.140625	6.25	
24	446.146875	6.25	
25	446.153125	6.25	
26	446.159375	6.25	
27	446.165625	6.25	
28	446.171875	6.25	
29	446.178125	6.25	
30	446.184375	6.25	
31	446.190625	6.25	
32	446.196875	6.25	

== PMR446 gateways ==
Recently some users have implemented the simplex repeater system, a cheap and easy way to extend the radio range by using extra radios connected to a small repeater controller. This is also known as "Parrot", "ATX-2000" or just "Echo Repeater" after how it sounds repeating every transmission it receives.

PMR446 gateways extend the range of PMR446. These gateways are connected through internet using a client/server VoIP system such as eQSO or the Free Radio Network (FRN).

== Law ==
- Decision ERC (98) 25
- Decision ERC (98) 26
- Decision ERC (98) 27
- Decision ECC (05) 12
- Decision ECC (15) 05

== See also ==
- 70-centimeter band
- KDR 444
- LPD433
- Personal radio service
- Public Radio Service
- Business band
