= KDR 444 =

Licence-free personal radio service

KDR 444 (Norwegian "kortdistanseradio", Swedish "kortdistansradio", "short distance radio") or KDR, is a licence-free personal radio service in the UHF range used in Sweden and Norway. It is usually referred to as SRBR 444 (Short Range Business Radio) in Sweden. Transmitters are limited to 2 W ERP (previously 1 W) in Sweden and 0.5 W in Norway. FM with a bandwidth of 25 kilohertz is used. Norway requires a radio with fixed antenna to be used with these frequencies.

== Channels ==
Norway has 6 channels, while Sweden has 8 channels. Note that channel 6 is different in Norway and Sweden.

	Norway	Sweden
Channel	Frequency (MHz)	Frequency (MHz)
1	444.600	444.600
2	444.650	444.650
3	444.800	444.800
4	444.825	444.825
5	444.850	444.850
6	444.975	444.875
7		444.925
8		444.975

Channels use FM. Frequencies 444.875 and 444.925 are newer frequencies available in Sweden but may not be available in some other regions (such as Norway); older equipment may also lack these new frequencies. Consequently, 444.975 is likely to be called channel number six on such devices.

== European use ==
KDR 444 is specific to parts of Scandinavia and is not cleared for use across the European Union.

== See also ==
- PMR446
- UHF CB
- Family Radio Service
