= LPD433 =

European radio band for license-free devices

LPD433 (low power device 433 MHz) is a UHF band in which license free communication devices are allowed to operate in some regions. The frequencies correspond with the ITU region 1 ISM band of 433.050 MHz to 434.790 MHz. The frequencies used are within the 70-centimeter band, which is currently otherwise reserved for government and amateur radio operations in the United States and most nations worldwide.

LPD hand-held radios are authorized for licence-free voice communications use in most of Europe using analog frequency modulation (FM) as part of short range device regulations, with 25 kHz channel spacing, for a total of 69 channels. In some countries, LPD devices may only be used with an integral and non-removable antenna with a maximum legal power output of 10 mW.

Voice communication in the LPD band was introduced to reduce the burden on the eight (now sixteen) PMR446 channels over shorter ranges (less than 1 km; 1000 yards).

LPD is also used in vehicle key-less entry device, garage or gate openers and some outdoor home weather station products.

== Usage by country ==
=== ITU Region 1 (Europe) ===
==== United Kingdom ====
In the UK, LPD433 equipment that meets the respective Ofcom Interface Requirement can be used for model control, analogue/digitised voice and remote keyless entry systems. There is significant scope for interference however, both on frequency and on adjacent frequencies, as the band is far from free. The frequencies from 430 to 440 MHz are allocated on a secondary basis to licensed radio amateurs who are allowed to use up to 40 W (16 dBW) between 430 and 432 MHz and 400 W (26 dBW) between 432 and 440 MHz. Channels 1 to 14 are UK amateur repeater outputs and channels 62 to 69 are UK amateur repeater inputs. This band is shared on a secondary basis for both licensed and licence exempt users, with the primary user being the Ministry of Defence.

Ofcom, together with the RSGB Emerging Technology Co-ordination Committee have produced guidelines to help mitigate the side effects of interference to an extent.

==== Switzerland ====
Switzerland permits the use of all 69 LPD433 channels with a maximum power output of 10 mW.

==== Spain ====
According to a recently published (June 2021) resolution of the Spanish government, where it defines 'interface IR-266', non-specific mobile short-range devices may be used without authorization for voice applications with 'advanced mitigation techniques' (such as listening before talking) from 434.040 to 434.790 MHz, with channels narrower than 25 kHz and with a maximum 'apparent radiated power' of 10 mW. This would make the use of LPD433 channels 40 to 69 possible in Spain.

==== Other European countries ====
European remote keyless entry systems often use the 433 MHz band, although, as in all of Europe, these frequencies are within the 70-centimeter band allocated to amateur radio, and interference results. In Germany, before the end of 2008, radio control enthusiasts were able to use frequencies from channel 03 through 67 for radio control of any form of model (air or ground-based), all with odd channel numbers (03, 05, etc. up to ch. 67), with each sanctioned frequency having 50 kHz of bandwidth separation between each adjacent channel.

=== ITU Region 2 (America) ===
In ITU region 2 (the Americas), the frequencies that LPD433 uses are also within the 70-centimeter band allocated to amateur radio. In the United States LPD433 radios can only be used under FCC amateur regulations by properly licensed amateur radio operators.

=== ITU Region 3 ===
==== Malaysia ====
In Malaysia, this band is also within the 70-centimeter band (430.000 – 440.000 MHz) allocated to amateur radio. Class B amateur radio holders are permitted to transmit up to 50 watts PEP power level. There is no licence requirement for LPD as long as it complies with requirement regulated by Malaysian Communications And Multimedia Commission (MCMC). As regulated by MCMC in Technical Code for Short Range Devices, remote control and security device are allowed up to 50 mW ERP and up to 100 mW ERP for Short Range Communication (SRC) devices. RFID are allowed up to 100 mW EIRP.

== Channels ==
Channel	Frequency (MHz)	Channel	Frequency (MHz)	Channel	Frequency (MHz)
1	433.075	24	433.650	47	434.225
2	433.100	25	433.675	48	434.250
3	433.125	26	433.700	49	434.275
4	433.150	27	433.725	50	434.300
5	433.175	28	433.750	51	434.325
6	433.200	29	433.775	52	434.350
7	433.225	30	433.800	53	434.375
8	433.250	31	433.825	54	434.400
9	433.275	32	433.850	55	434.425
10	433.300	33	433.875	56	434.450
11	433.325	34	433.900	57	434.475
12	433.350	35	433.925	58	434.500
13	433.375	36	433.950	59	434.525
14	433.400	37	433.975	60	434.550
15	433.425	38	434.000	61	434.575
16	433.450	39	434.025	62	434.600
17	433.475	40	434.050	63	434.625
18	433.500	41	434.075	64	434.650
19	433.525	42	434.100	65	434.675
20	433.550	43	434.125	66	434.700
21	433.575	44	434.150	67	434.725
22	433.600	45	434.175	68	434.750
23	433.625	46	434.200	69	434.775

== See also ==
- PMR446
- Personal radio service
- Family Radio Service
- General Mobile Radio Service
- Part 15
- ISM band
- NTIA Manual of Regulations and Procedures for Federal Radio Frequency Management
