= Unlicensed Personal Communications Services =

SHF frequency band

Unlicensed Personal Communications Services or UPCS band is the 1920–1930 MHz frequency band allocated by the United States Federal Communications Commission (FCC) for short range Personal Communications Services (PCS) applications in the United States, such as the Digital Enhanced Cordless Telecommunications (DECT) wireless protocol.

== History ==
Prior to an FCC rules change in April 2005, the band also included the frequencies 1910-1920 MHz and 2390–2400 MHz. These were used for a variety of short range communications, including point-to-point microwave links.

== Allocation ==
These allocation rules are described in Title 47, Part 15 of the Code of Federal Regulations.

Licensed PCS, although not necessarily distinguished as such from UPCS, is used for digital mobile phone services.

DECT devices designed to operate in this band in the US use the marketing term DECT 6.0.

== See also ==
- Amateur radio (Licence Required)
- Citizens band radio
- Family Radio Service
- General Mobile Radio Service
- Multi-Use Radio Service
