= General Mobile Radio Service =

Land-mobile FM UHF radio service for short-distance two-way communications

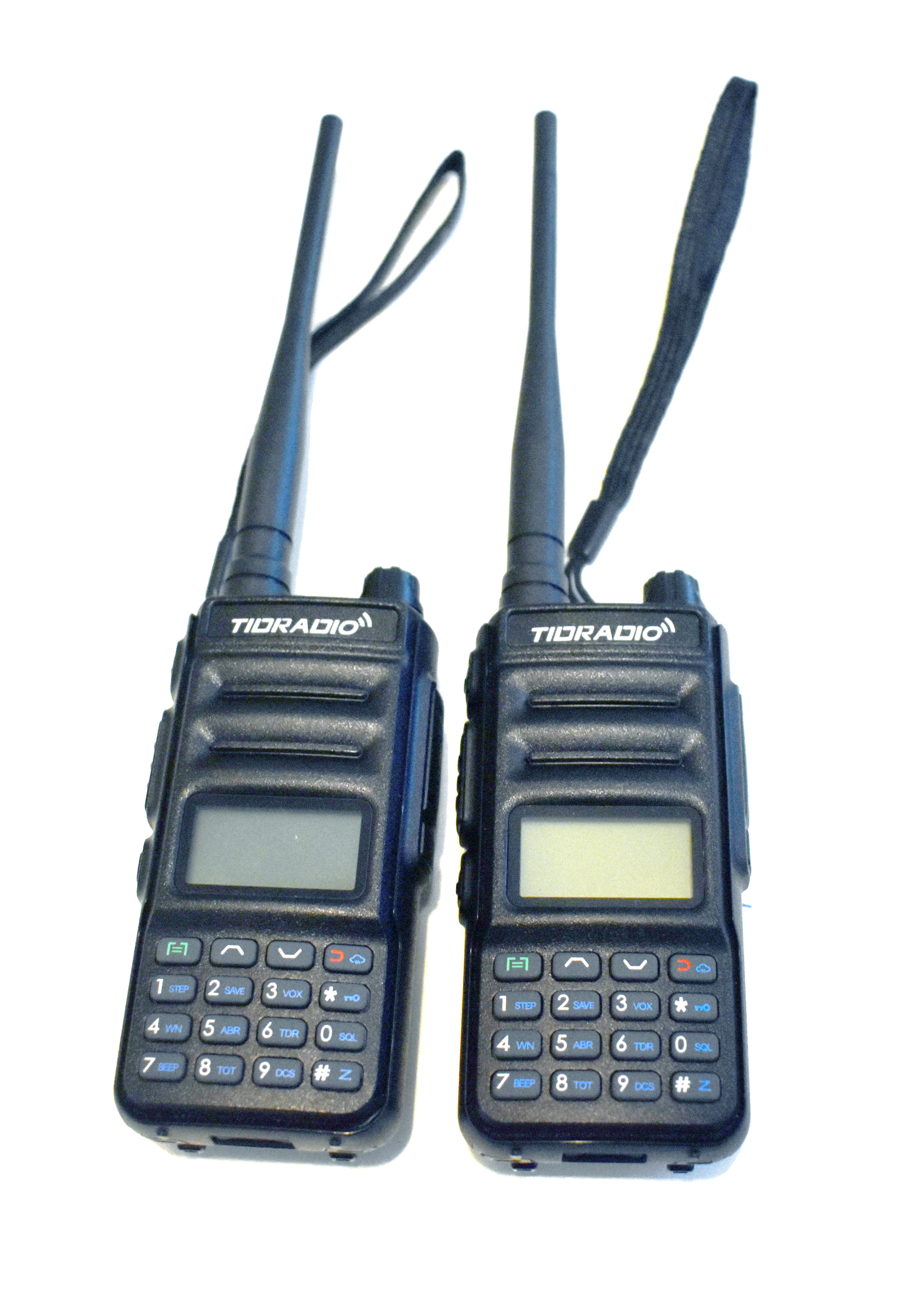
TIDRADIO TD-H5 GMRS radios.

The General Mobile Radio Service (GMRS) is a land-mobile FM UHF radio service designed for short-range two-way voice communication and authorized under part 95 of the US FCC code. It requires a license in the United States, but some GMRS compatible equipment can be used license-free in Canada. The US GMRS license is issued for a period of 10 years. The United States permits use by adult individuals who possess a valid GMRS license, as well as their immediate family members. (Note: The FCC definition of “immediate family” includes the licensee's spouse, children, stepchildren, parents, stepparents, siblings, grandparents, aunts, uncles, nephews, nieces, and in-laws. See 47 CFR 95.1705.) Immediate relatives of the GMRS system licensee are entitled to communicate among themselves for personal or business purposes, but employees of the licensee who are not family members are not covered by the license. Non-family members must be licensed separately.

GMRS radios are typically handheld portables (walkie-talkies) much like Family Radio Service (FRS) radios, and they share a frequency band with FRS near 462 and 467 MHz. Mobile and base station-style radios are available as well, but these are normally commercial UHF radios as often used in public service and commercial land mobile bands. These are legal for use in this service as long as they are certified for GMRS under USC 47 Part 95. Older radios that are certified under USC 47 Part 90 are "grandfathered in", and can also be used legally for GMRS.

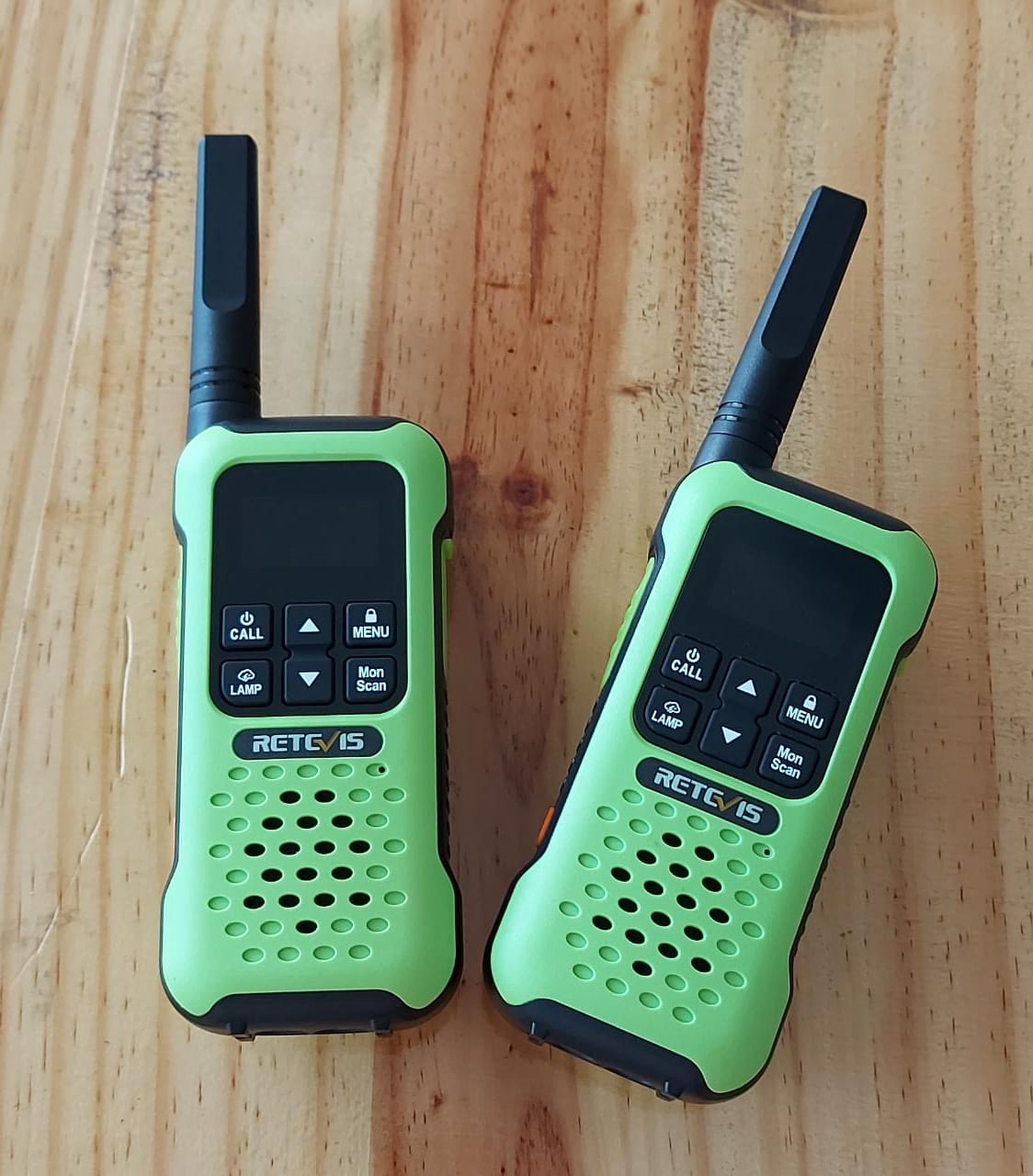
Retevis RT49P GMRS version.

GMRS licensees are allowed to establish repeaters to extend their communications range. However repeaters cannot be linked together over the internet nor connected to the public switched telephone network.

== Licensing ==
Any individual in the United States who is at least 18 years of age and not a representative of a foreign government may apply for a GMRS license by completing the application form, online through the FCC's Universal Licensing System. No exam is required. A GMRS license is issued for a 10–year term. The fee was reduced to $35 for all applicants on April 19, 2022.

A GMRS individual license extends to immediate family members and authorizes them to use the licensed system. GMRS license holders are allowed to communicate with FRS users on those frequencies that are shared between the two services. GMRS individual licenses do not extend to employees.

New GMRS licenses are being issued only to individuals. Prior to July 31, 1987, the FCC issued GMRS licenses to non-individuals (corporations, partnerships, government entities, etc.). These licensees are grandfathered and may renew but not make major modifications to their existing licenses.

In any case, each GMRS station must be identified by transmission of its FCC-assigned call sign at the end of a transmission or a series of transmissions, and at least once every 15 minutes for a series lasting more than 15 minutes. The call sign may be spoken or sent with audible tones using Morse code. A repeater station handling properly identified transmissions of others is not required to send its own station identification.

== Range ==
As with other UHF radio services, reliable range is considered to be line-of-sight and the distance to the radio horizon can be estimated based on antenna height. Theoretically, the range between two hand-held units on flat ground would be about one or two miles (1.6 or 3.2 km). Mobile units might have a slightly farther range when mounted on a car roof. A GMRS repeater with an antenna mounted high above the surrounding terrain can extend the usable range to 20 miles (32 km) depending on height. Obstructions such as hills, trees, and buildings will reduce range. Higher power does not give much increase in range although it may improve the reliability of communication at the limits of line-of-sight distance.

== Frequency assignments ==
GMRS is allotted 30 frequency channels in the vicinity of 462 MHz and 467 MHz. They are divided into 16 main channels and 14 interstitial channels.

Licensees may use the eight main 462 MHz channels for simplex communication or repeater outputs.

The eight main 467 MHz channels may only be used as repeater inputs, in conjunction with the 462 MHz channels as outputs. The repeater input frequencies are exclusive to GMRS, and may be used only by licensed GMRS operators.

GMRS operators are permitted to transmit at up to 50 watts transmitter power output, on the 16 main channels, but transmitting 1 to 5 watts is more common in practice.

The interstitial frequencies are in-between the main channels, and the 462 MHz interstitial frequencies may be used for simplex as long as the effective radiated power (ERP) does not exceed 5 watts. The 467 MHz interstitial frequencies have a power limit of 500 milliwatts ERP, and only hand-held portable units may transmit on these channels.

=== Sharing with FRS ===
All 22 Family Radio Service (FRS) frequencies are shared with GMRS, and users of the two services may communicate with each other. With the exception of FRS channels 8 through 14, GMRS licensees may use higher power radios with detachable or external antennas.

Suggested Channel Usage

Within the GMRS, any specific purpose of any channel is merely suggested (typically online by various groups), and is not required by the FCC regulations (different from some regulated channel assignments for CB radio or Marine Radio for example).

Channel 1, by its position as “default” on GMRS and FRS devices, tends to be the most often used, especially in urban areas. This suits it well as an SOS channel suggestion, as there are likely more users on channel 1 versus the other channels. Beyond that, usage varies widely for all channels in both amount of traffic and purpose. Some websites list channel 20 as the “National GMRS calling channel”, or as the “Traveler’s assistance” channel, along with a suggested CTCSS tone of 141.3 Hz. Additionally, there is a movement to utilize Channel 19 (with no tone, “CSQ”) as a “highway chat channel,” paralleling the common use for the same numbered channel in the CB Radio Service. This movement has arisen as of 2026, and includes the support of Midland, a radio manufacturer. It is unclear how well known (or followed) these or any usage suggestions are across the United States, but in general, channels tend to be selected by lack of radio traffic or by repeater pair availability, not an “official” or suggested purpose, using the required “listen before talk” regulation.

=== Frequency table ===
Frequency	Channel	FRS power	FRS bandwidth	FRS maximum deviation	GMRS power	GMRS bandwidth	GMRS maximum deviation	Notes
462.5625 MHz	1	2 W	12.5 kHz	2.5 kHz	5 W	20 kHz	5 kHz	(1)
462.5875 MHz	2	2 W	12.5 kHz	2.5 kHz	5 W	20 kHz	5 kHz	(1)
462.6125 MHz	3	2 W	12.5 kHz	2.5 kHz	5 W	20 kHz	5 kHz	(1)
462.6375 MHz	4	2 W	12.5 kHz	2.5 kHz	5 W	20 kHz	5 kHz	(1)
462.6625 MHz	5	2 W	12.5 kHz	2.5 kHz	5 W	20 kHz	5 kHz	(1)
462.6875 MHz	6	2 W	12.5 kHz	2.5 kHz	5 W	20 kHz	5 kHz	(1)
462.7125 MHz	7	2 W	12.5 kHz	2.5 kHz	5 W	20 kHz	5 kHz	(1)
467.5625 MHz	8	0.5 W	12.5 kHz	2.5 kHz	0.5 W	12.5 kHz	2.5 kHz	(1)
467.5875 MHz	9	0.5 W	12.5 kHz	2.5 kHz	0.5 W	12.5 kHz	2.5 kHz	(1)
467.6125 MHz	10	0.5 W	12.5 kHz	2.5 kHz	0.5 W	12.5 kHz	2.5 kHz	(1)
467.6375 MHz	11	0.5 W	12.5 kHz	2.5 kHz	0.5 W	12.5 kHz	2.5 kHz	(1)
467.6625 MHz	12	0.5 W	12.5 kHz	2.5 kHz	0.5 W	12.5 kHz	2.5 kHz	(1)
467.6875 MHz	13	0.5 W	12.5 kHz	2.5 kHz	0.5 W	12.5 kHz	2.5 kHz	(1)
467.7125 MHz	14	0.5 W	12.5 kHz	2.5 kHz	0.5 W	12.5 kHz	2.5 kHz	(1)
462.5500 MHz	15	2 W	12.5 kHz	2.5 kHz	50 W	20 kHz	5 kHz	(2)
462.5750 MHz	16	2 W	12.5 kHz	2.5 kHz	50 W	20 kHz	5 kHz	(2)
462.6000 MHz	17	2 W	12.5 kHz	2.5 kHz	50 W	20 kHz	5 kHz	(2)
462.6250 MHz	18	2 W	12.5 kHz	2.5 kHz	50 W	20 kHz	5 kHz	(2)
462.6500 MHz	19	2 W	12.5 kHz	2.5 kHz	50 W	20 kHz	5 kHz	(2)
462.6750 MHz	20	2 W	12.5 kHz	2.5 kHz	50 W	20 kHz	5 kHz	(2)
462.7000 MHz	21	2 W	12.5 kHz	2.5 kHz	50 W	20 kHz	5 kHz	(2)
462.7250 MHz	22	2 W	12.5 kHz	2.5 kHz	50 W	20 kHz	5 kHz	(2)
467.5500 MHz	15R	—N/a	—N/a	—N/a	50 W	20 kHz	5 kHz	(3)
467.5750 MHz	16R	—N/a	—N/a	—N/a	50 W	20 kHz	5 kHz	(3)
467.6000 MHz	17R	—N/a	—N/a	—N/a	50 W	20 kHz	5 kHz	(3)
467.6250 MHz	18R	—N/a	—N/a	—N/a	50 W	20 kHz	5 kHz	(3)
467.6500 MHz	19R	—N/a	—N/a	—N/a	50 W	20 kHz	5 kHz	(3)
467.6750 MHz	20R	—N/a	—N/a	—N/a	50 W	20 kHz	5 kHz	(3)
467.7000 MHz	21R	—N/a	—N/a	—N/a	50 W	20 kHz	5 kHz	(3)
467.7250 MHz	22R	—N/a	—N/a	—N/a	50 W	20 kHz	5 kHz	(3)

Table notes
(1) Shared FRS and GMRS simplex.
(2) Shared FRS and GMRS simplex; GMRS repeater output.
(3) GMRS repeater input. The output frequency of this repeater input is the input frequency minus 5 MHz.

Note: Some inexpensive GMRS mobiles and portables do not fully comply with FCC permissible modulation bandwidth for GMRS and thus have weak transmitter audio and reduced range.

Conditions: There are no longer "Line A" or "Line C" geographic restrictions on GMRS channels near the Canadian border as of 2021 update to Part 95 .

GMRS and FRS radio frequency and power limitations

==== Bandwidth vs channel spacing ====
The FCC stipulates specific channel bandwidths for FRS and GMRS. The bandwidth is determined by peak FM deviation (GMRS = ±5.0 kHz, FRS = ±2.5 kHz) plus a margin to accommodate filter roll-off and transmitter frequency drift. GMRS Channel spacing is 25 kHz. A 20 kHz wide signal leaves room for a 2.5 kHz guard band on either side of the signal. FRS channels occupy a 12.5 kHz wide slot between two GMRS channels. FRS radios generally use an 11 kHz transmitter bandwidth with an output power level less than a GMRS transmitter to minimize interference to adjacent GMRS channels.

== History ==
The predecessor to GMRS was named Class A Citizens Radio Service when it was commissioned in the 1940s. Tube-type transceivers were used, and transmitter power was limited to 60 watts (plate input power to the final amplifier tube). The original service ran wideband FM with ±15 kHz transmitter deviation and 50 kHz channel spacing. At the time, this was the norm for all U.S. land mobile services. There was also a Class B Citizens Radio Service which used a different set of 461 MHz channels and was limited to five watts output. Business users were permitted to license in this radio service. Radios were built by consumer electronics firms and commercial two-way radio vendors.

In the 1960s, the UHF 450–470 MHz band was re-allocated to 25 kHz channels. This meant transmitter deviation was reduced to ±5 kHz. This doubled the number of channels available across the entire 450–470 MHz band. Class B Citizens Radio Service channels were re-allocated to other radio services.

In the 1970s, allowed power was again changed to 50 watts across the output terminals of the transmitter. In 1987, licensing of business users was discontinued and businesses were allowed to continue operating until their licenses expired. There was congestion on all channels in larger metropolitan statistical areas and moving businesses to Business Radio Service channels would provide some relief. The radio service was changed to its present name; General Mobile Radio Service or GMRS.

In 2010 the U.S. Federal Communications Commission (FCC) proposed removing the individual licensing requirement. In 2015, the FCC ruled to keep the license requirement, but to remove the regulator fee for licensing. Adopted on May 20, 2015, the ruling would be in effect after a 90–day notification period to Congress; the fee will not be eliminated before August 18, 2015. The fee for a 5–year license was $90, with the regulatory fee portion of the license at $5 per year (or $25 for the 5–year life of the license). After the notification period, the fee for a 5–year license was to become $65. The change became effective on September 3, 2015.

Effective September 28, 2017, FCC revised the definition of the FRS service. FRS operation is now permitted with up to 2 watts on the shared FRS/GMRS channels. The FCC will not grant certification for hybrid radios that would exceed the limits for the FRS service on the FRS channels. Current "hybrid" FRS/GMRS radios will not require a GMRS license for power up to 2 watts, but FRS radios will still not be permitted to use the input frequencies of GMRS repeaters. Any radio exceeding the limits of the new FRS service will be classified as a GMRS radio.

On September 30, 2019, it became unlawful in the United States to import, manufacture, sell, or offer to sell radio equipment capable of operating under both GMRS and FRS.

== Use of GMRS equipment in countries outside the US ==
The use of radio transmitters is regulated by national laws and international agreements. Often radio equipment accepted for use in one part of the world may not be operated in other parts due to conflicts with frequency assignments and technical standards. Some of the roles that the licensed GMRS service fills in the United States are, in other countries, filled by unlicensed or class-licensed services. Generally these services have strict technical standards for equipment to prevent interference with licensed transmitters and systems.

In Canada, hand-held GMRS radios up to 2 watts have been approved for use without a license since September 2004. Typically these are dual FRS and GMRS units, with fixed antennas, and operating at 2 watts on some GMRS channels and 0.5 watts on the FRS-only channels. Mobile units (permanently mounted in vehicles), base stations and repeaters are not currently permitted on the GMRS channels in Canada.

Other countries have licensed and unlicensed personal radio services with somewhat similar characteristics, but technical details and operating conditions vary according to national rules. Many European countries use a similar 16–channel system near 446 MHz known as PMR446, as well as a 69–channel low-power LPD433 which is shared with the 433.92 MHz ISM band. GMRS equipment that is approved for use in the United States will not communicate with PMR446 radios due to using different frequency ranges.

== GMRS License fee change ==
Currently, the application fee for a GMRS license is $35. An FCC Report and Order released December 23, 2020, and in a subsequent notice issued by the FCC on March 23, 2022, the fee dropped from $70 to $35 starting on April 19, 2022. The license is still valid for 10 years and covers immediate family.

== Repeater Linking ==
GMRS used to be regularly linked to other repeaters. The common practice for this linking was done via internet. This was commonly referred to as GMRS linking using nodes running a modified HamVoip version of Asterisk.

Around January 24, 2024, the FCC changed the wording on GMRS operations page that said "You cannot directly interconnect a GMRS station with the telephone network." to now include (among other things) "or any other network". As of November 1, 2024 it now has this added to the operations tab: "In other words, repeaters may not be linked via the internet—an example of an “other network” in the rules—to extend the range of the communications across a large geographic area. Linking multiple repeaters to enable a repeater outside the communications range of the handheld or mobile device to retransmit messages violates sections 95.1733(a)(8) and 95.1749 of the commission's rules, and potentially other rules in 47 C.F.R. Repeaters may be connected to the telephone network or other networks only for purposes of remote control of a GMRS station, not for carrying communication signals. " Wording changes did not affect local repeaters. This change did shut down several major nodes. This change was not an official act; it was instead done through interpretation set forth by the Chevron Deference. The changes and shutdowns of nodes has drawn mixed reactions. On Aug. 5, 2026, the FCC issued a Notice of Violation against the owner of North Georgia GMRS, Gary M. Beckstedt Sr. the licensee of station WQYU407 in Newnan, Ga., accusing him of improperly using the internet to link repeaters for simultaneous transmission to achieve far wider coverage. Beckstedt was ordered to, within 20 days, file a response that "(i) must fully explain the violation, including all relevant surrounding facts and circumstances, (ii) must contain a statement of the specific action(s) taken to correct the violation and preclude recurrence, and (iii) must include a timeline for completion of any pending corrective action(s)."

== See also ==
- Multi-Use Radio Service
- Public Radio Service
- Unlicensed Personal Communications Services
