= Baofeng =

Baofeng may refer to:

- Baofeng County - in Henan Province, China
- Baofeng Lake - in Henan Province, China
- Baofeng railway station - in Henan Province, China
- Baofeng (company) - a radio equipment manufacturer in China
  - Baofeng UV-5R, a handheld radio made by Baofeng
