= Now (brand) =

Toy electronic brand

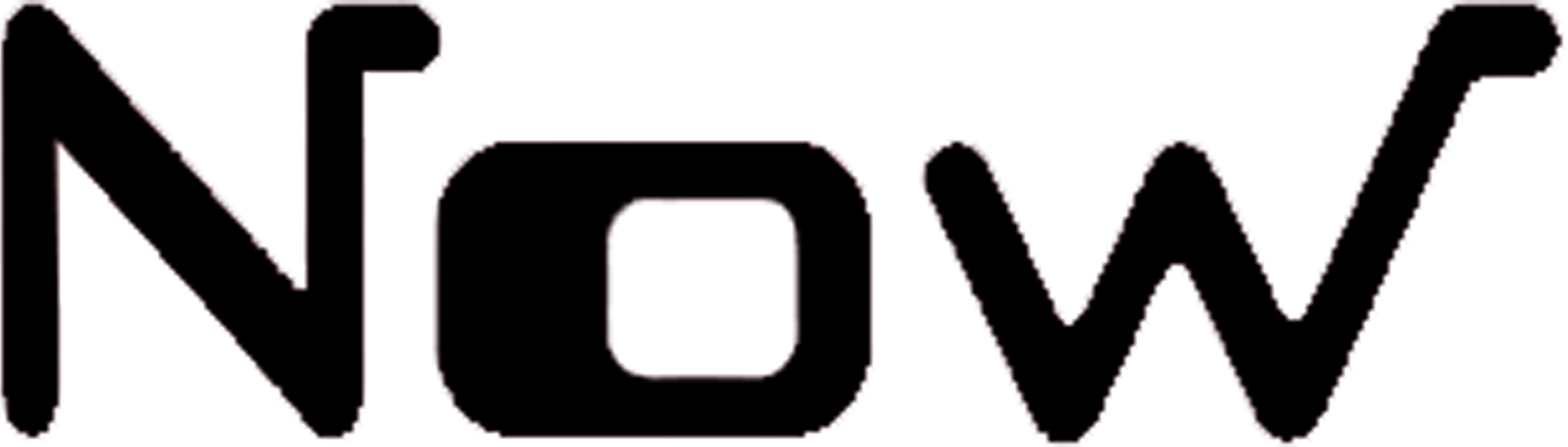
Logo for the "Now" brand of toy electronics

Now was a brand of electronics by Hasbro through Tiger Electronics that specializes in multimedia. Its most popular brand was the VideoNow, which was a personal videodisc player for children who wanted to watch their favorite shows on the go. The device was introduced in 2003, and as it sold well, Tiger began to experiment with other Now brands. The Now brand was discontinued by late 2007, after the VideoNow Color FX and TVNow left store shelves.

== Products ==
=== VideoNow ===
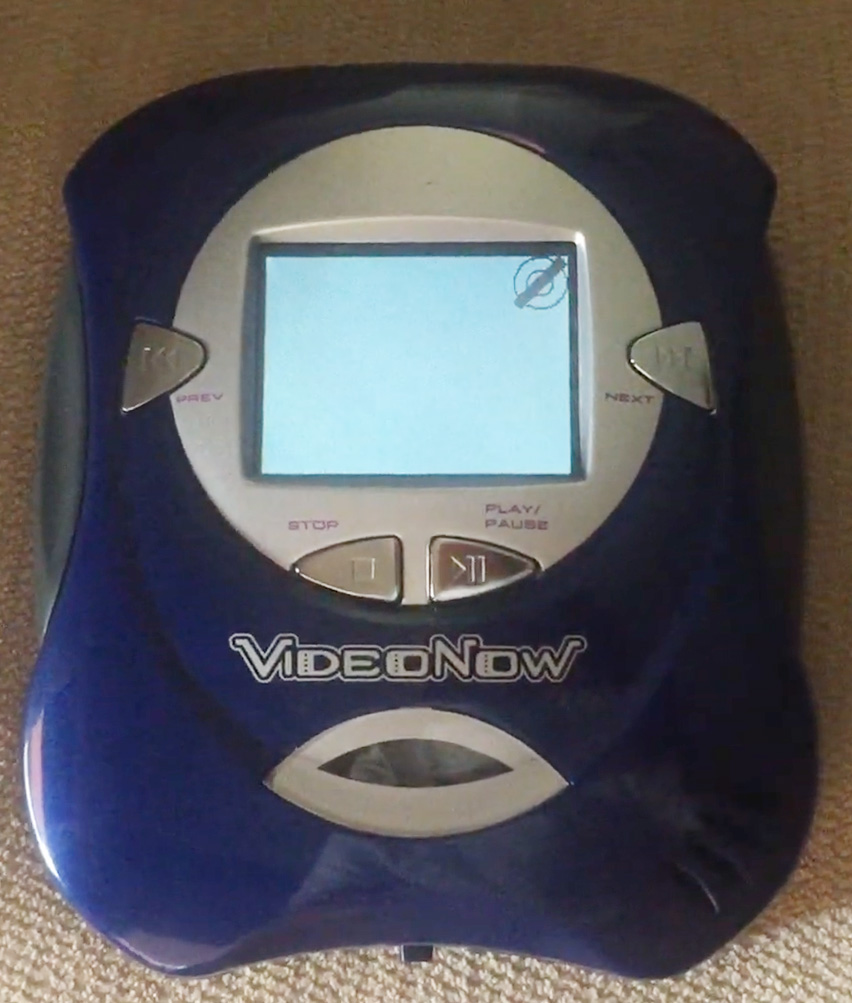
A VideoNow Color without a disc inserted.

The first, and most popular, line of "Now" products. Introduced in 2003, the VideoNow systems are portable video players for children to watch their favorite shows on the go.

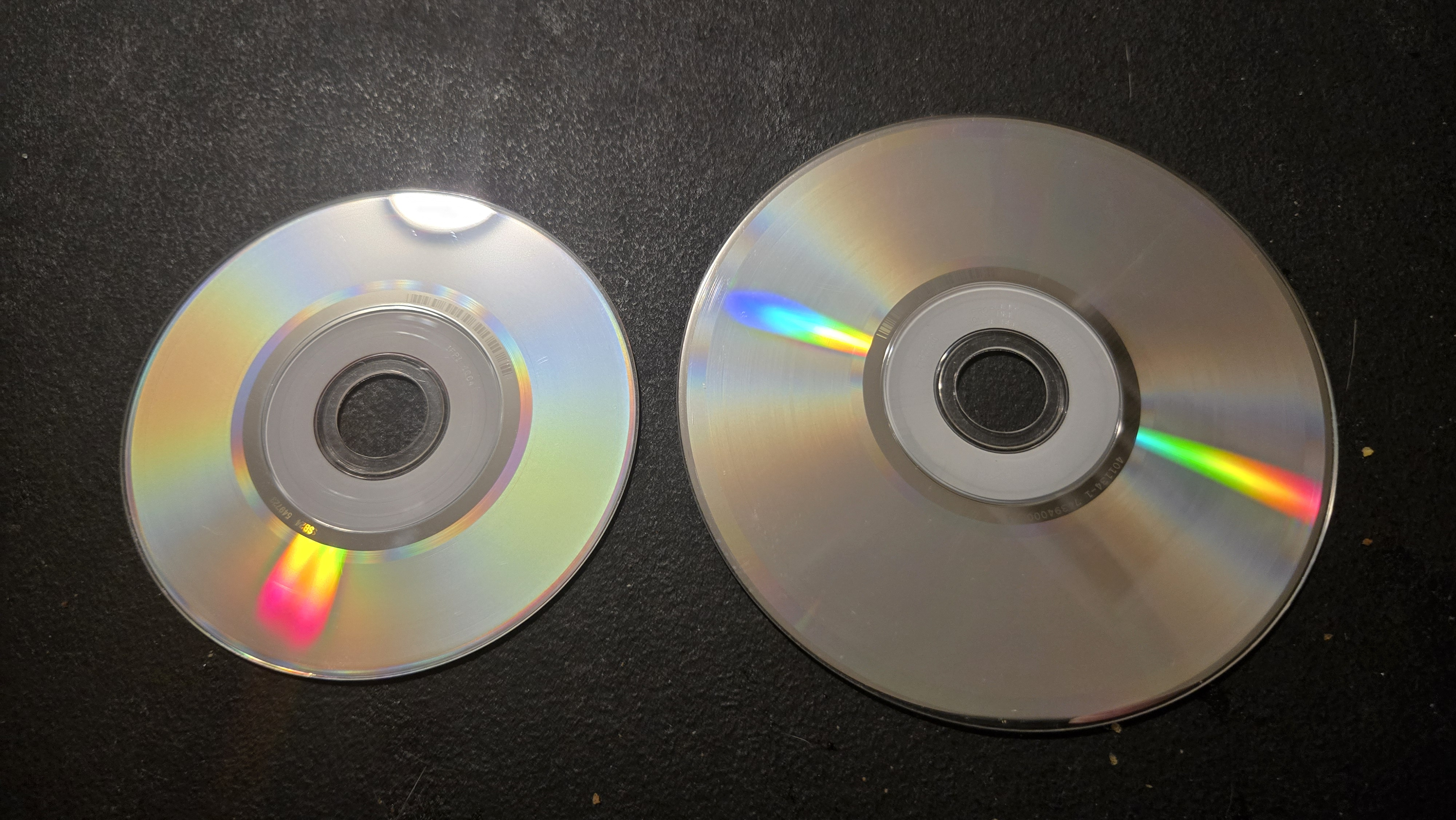
VideoNow PVD Size Comparison: PVD for Original VideoNow (left), PVD for VideoNow Color (right)

The systems use discs called PVDs (which stands for Personal Video Disc), which can store about 30 minutes of video,, limiting PVDs to one episode of a TV show (Note: Releases of shows that split their episodes into two or more segments were marketed as having that amount of episodes) with some trailers at the end. PVDs are derived from audio CDs, storing Video data on the left audio channel and mono audio on the right channel. The video plays at 15fps.

Most VideoNow releases were of shows from Nickelodeon, such as SpongeBob SquarePants and The Fairly OddParents, and later they released shows from Cartoon Network, such as Ed, Edd n Eddy and Dexter's Laboratory, Disney only mostly released episodes of America’s Funniest Home Videos and one Hannah Montana music video. A small amount of movies were also released on the system, but due to the limited space on a PVD, said movies would have to be released on at least three discs, depending on the length of said film.

The first VideoNow was released in October 2003 as a black and white media player, and by 2004, the VideoNow Color was introduced as a more colorized version of the system. In 2005, two new VideoNow systems were introduced; one called the "VideoNow Jr.", made for preschoolers through Playskool that also contains discs that were more flexible and rubbery. Another called the "VideoNow XP", that's designed to resemble the Nintendo Game Boy Advance SP, and included interactive features.

By 2006, the fifth and final of the original VideoNow Players was introduced as the "VideoNow Color FX"; a more translucent version of the VideoNow Color.

Hasbro also produced editing software for creating custom VideoNow Color PVDs called the VideoNow Media Wizard in 2005, which came with blank PVD media. Also included was the VCamNow, a VideoNow-branded camcorder that came with a copy of the Media Wizard.

=== PlayItNow ===
The PlayItNow was a Digital Music Recorder launched in 2004 that also functions as a game console. It included an auxiliary port that allows users to record audio, including music, and they'll listen to it wherever they go, semi-similar to the HitClips. The device also came with licensed games from Atari, as usually 5 games were included, such as Pong, Circus Atari, Adventure, Battlezone, and Lunar Lander. Although, some PlayItNow devices also included another Atari game called Wayniak.

=== ChatNow ===
A demonstration of two ChatNow devices.

The ChatNow is a mobile phone-like walkie-talkie developed by Hasbro's Tiger Electronics division for the preteen market, as part of the Now brand of consumer products. It includes simple digital photography and text message functionality and transmits using the Family Radio Service UHF radio band. It has limited compatibility with other FRS gear; in particular, it is not compatible with CTCSS or DCS signals commonly used on standard FRS gear.

ChatNow differs from standard walkie-talkies by having a 10-digit "Buddy number" (ex.0794020300), allowing users to communicate with specific other users in a telephone-like manner; to make text messaging easier, the ChatNow units provide limited buddy list capability. There is a limited digital camera built into the device as well, and the unit can store up to 30 black and white pictures.

The units were sold in pairs, and came in both flip phone and slide-out configurations. Hasbro also manufactured add-ons and carrying cases for the line, including an antenna which allowed it to pick up FM radio.

=== TVNow ===
Originally released in 2005 as the VuGo, the TVNow was a personal handheld DVR player from 2006 to 2007, published by Hasbro under Tiger Electronics, and was the last product Tiger released under the "Now" brand. Advertised as a portable video recorder, the TVNow allows kids to connect to a DVD player, cable box, satellite receiver, VCR, or TV, so that they can record and play back their favorite shows on the go. It has a 128MB Built-in Memory, which holds up to 1 hour of video, as well as an SD card slot for additional storage. The device also supports MP3 files. The package dimensions up to 9.1 x 7 x 3 inches, weighs 1.35 pounds, and its ASIN is B000M6CIJI.

== See also ==
- Family Radio Service
- Hasbro
- Tiger Electronics
- Game Boy Advance Video
- Juice Box
