= Baofeng UV-5R =

Handheld radio manufactured by Baofeng

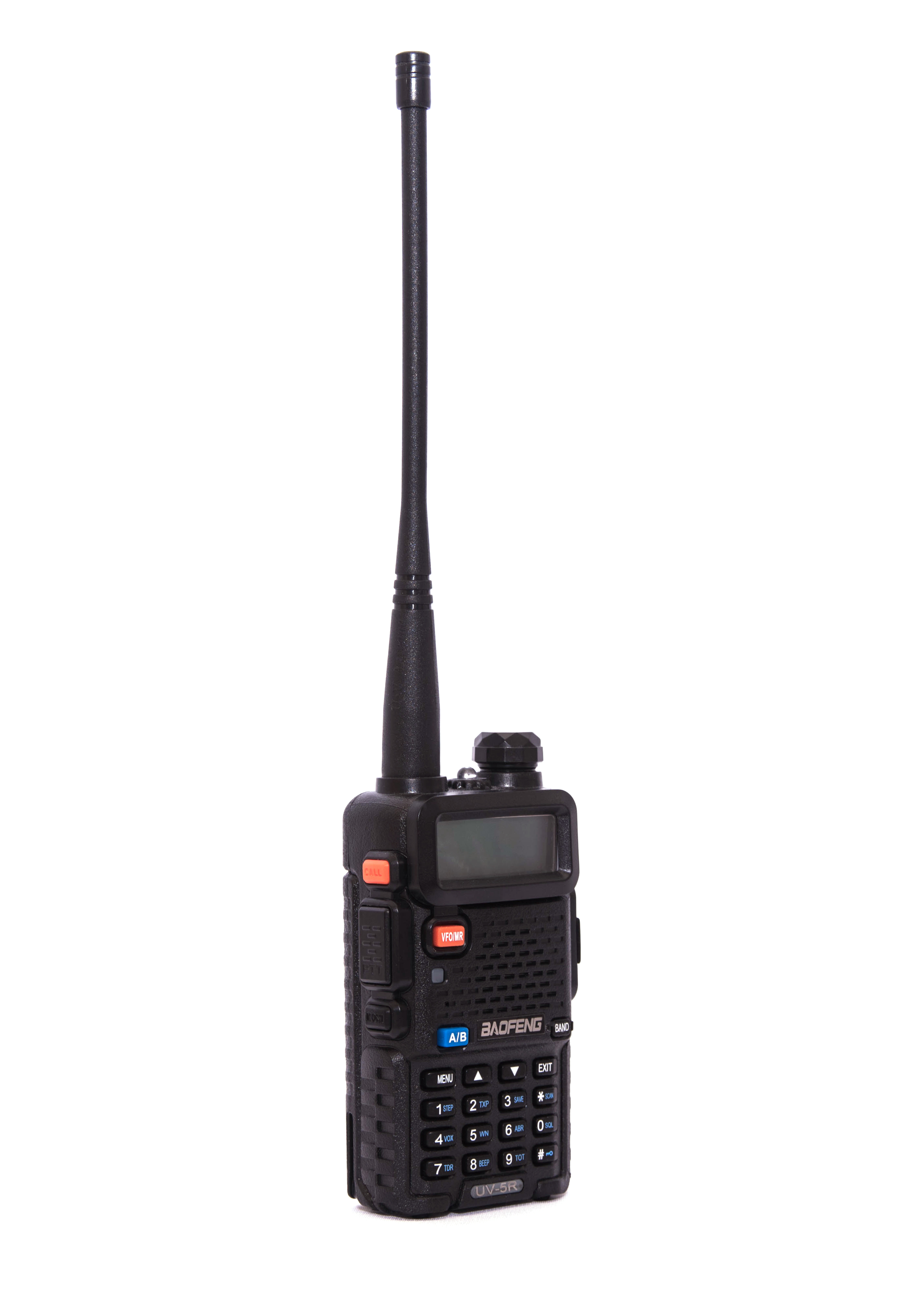
Baofeng UV-5R
noframe
Technical data
Frequency range	65–108.0 MHz (Rx); 136–174 MHz; 400–520 MHz
Frequency steps	2.5–50k Hz
Transmitter power output	5 W PEP
Waveforms (modulations)	FM
modulation rate
Power input	Receiver only 20 mA, Transmitter 1 A max.
Operating voltage	6.5 – 8.5 V, Nominal voltage 7.2 V
Measurements and weight
Height	95 mm (265 mm with antenna)
Width	55 mm
Depth	30 mm
Weight	approx. 400 grams
Further information
Producer	Baofeng
Scope of application	radio amateurs, (semi-) professional users

The Baofeng UV-5R (Note: English IPA: /ˈbuːfwæŋ/; Chinese: 宝锋; pinyin: Bǎo fēng) is a handheld radio transceiver manufactured by the Chinese manufacturer Baofeng. This model was the first dual band radio (VHF/UHF) to be successfully distributed by a Chinese brand. It is inexpensive and relatively simple to use. Because of this, it is used by radio amateurs, outdoorsmen and professional users worldwide, outputting about a 1-5 watt FM signal.

Baofeng Radios have a selection of which PEP is preferred by the user. This can be accessed by clicking the MENU button, and clicking 2. User will be prompted for what watts PEP is preferred, between HIGH = 5W-4W and LOW = 1W

== History ==
The Baofeng UV-5R has been produced since 2012 and exported to markets worldwide. The controversial radio had no FCC Part 95 certification in the United States. As a result, it was not authorized for use in the GMRS and FRS, only for amateur radio. Baofeng launched a number of other models based on the UV-5R technology, since 2012. Other radios from other Chinese manufacturers have mainly the same range of functions, specs and menu as the UV-5R, for example the Retevis RT5.

The UV-5R has attracted the attention of multiple telecommunications regulators due to problems relating primarily to frequency interference and is banned from sale and use in Switzerland, Germany, Poland and South Africa. The German Federal Network Agency has banned the device because it dampens harmonics too poorly and can therefore disturb other users. The Independent Communications Authority of South Africa issued a ban after finding the UV-5R to be causing radio frequency interference and for having continuous tuning capabilities, a feature that would require an operator obtain a Frequency allocation license before purchasing or using the device.

=== Illegal marketing and distribution in the United States ===
The Baofeng UV-5R is a popular beginner amateur radio HT in the US. However, the FCC cited the Houston, Texas-based importer Amcrest Industries, which owns and operates Baofeng radio US for illegally marketing the UV-5R, "capable of operating outside the scope of its equipment authorization", the FCC Citation said, which is outside of its Part 90 authorization granted. The FCC asserted Amcrest marketed "UV-5R-series FM hand-held radios capable of transmitting on 'restricted frequencies'". Later revisions of the UV-5R sold in the US had transmission frequencies locked to the ham bands, however, there exists a key combination to unlock the ability to transmit on the full band.

=== Use in Russo-Ukrainian War ===
Both Russian and Ukrainian forces have used various Baofeng radios, including the Baofeng UV-5R, in the Russo-Ukrainian War and the ongoing Russian invasion of Ukraine.

== Features ==
The radio operates as a dual-band FM transceiver for the 2 m (VHF) and 70 cm (UHF) amateur radio bands. It is capable of transmitting and receiving approximately between 136–174 MHz (VHF) and 400–520 MHz (UHF), depending on regional regulations enforced by the importer.

Features include CTCSS and DCS tone support, 128 programmable memory channels, repeater offsets, dual-watch and dual-reception operation, an integrated LED flashlight, voice prompts in English or Chinese, and programmable LCD backlight colors.

Channels and operating parameters can be entered manually through the radio's front panel, though this method is often considered cumbersome. These settings can be edited through a personal computer using the CHIRP application and a USB programming cable.

== In popular culture ==
A Baofeng UV-5R with an upgraded battery was used as a prop in Ghostbusters: Frozen Empire.

== See also ==
- List of amateur radio transceivers § UV-5R
