= VideoNow =

Video disc player by Hasbro, 2003–2007

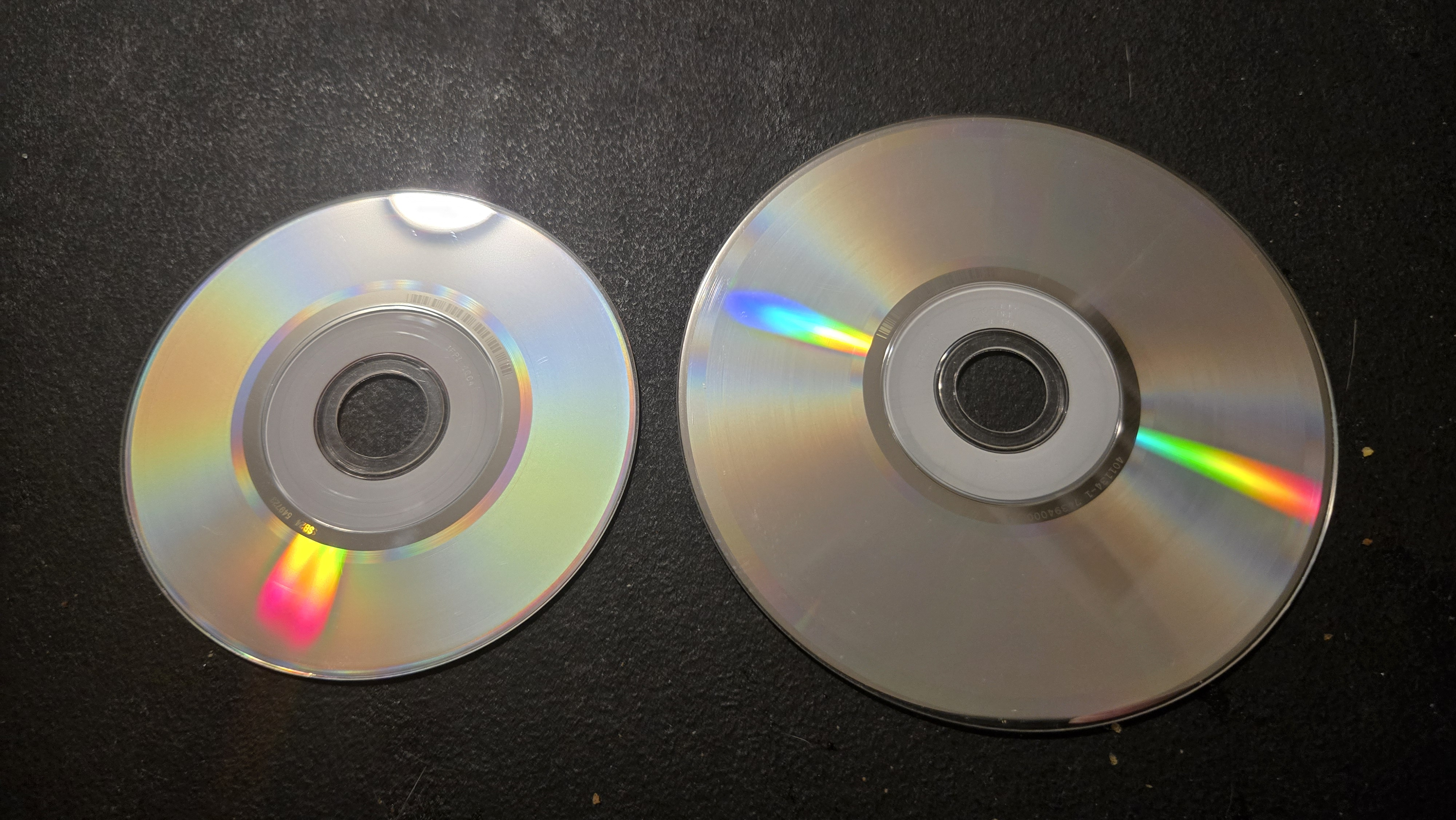
- left: PVD for Original VideoNow right: PVD for VideoNow Color
- Media type: Optical disc
- Capacity: 450 MB (VideoNow Color), up to 30 minutes.
- Developed by: Hasbro
- Dimensions: VideoNow: 3.3 in (84 mm) diameter VideoNow Color: 4.25 in (108 mm) diameter
- Usage: VideoNow players
- Extended from: CD
- Released: July 17, 2003
- Discontinued: 2007

The VideoNow is a discontinued line of portable video players produced by Hasbro and released by their subsidiary Tiger Electronics in 2003 as part of Tiger's line of Now consumer products. The systems use discs called Personal Video Discs (PVDs), which can store about 30 minutes of video,, enough to store one TV episode with some space left over for additional content (mostly trailers or other advertisements). As such, the majority of releases on VideoNow were TV series, with a small number of movies split onto at least three discs each. As the devices were targeted towards children, their libraries exclusively consisted of content considered kid-friendly, mainly coming from kids' channels such as Nickelodeon and Cartoon Network. The video is compressed, and runs at 15 fps. Audio is in mono, as video data is stored on the left audio channel, relegating sound to the right channel. The original model plays content in black and white, while later models could play content in color.

Hasbro also produced editing software for creating custom VideoNow Color PVDs called the VideoNow Media Wizard in 2005, which came with blank PVD media. VideoNow competed with other child-oriented portable video formats like Mattel's Juice Box and Game Boy Advance Video.

== Models ==
=== Standard Models ===
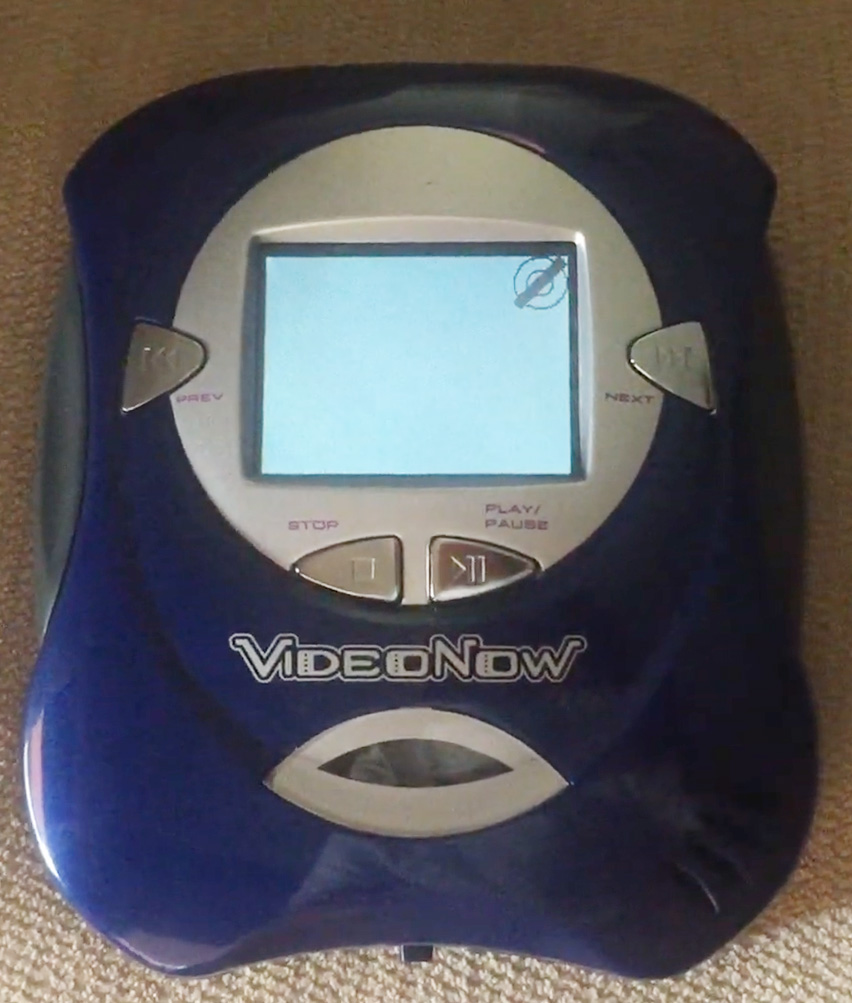
A VideoNow Color from Europe

- VideoNow - The first model, released on July 17, 2003. Its non-backlit screen has a resolution of 80 × 80 non-square pixels and can display up to 16 shades of gray. It uses 85 mm (3.3 in) discs.
- VideoNow Color - The second model, released on July 15, 2004. Its most notable improvement over the original model is the ability to play videos in color. Further, the screen is backlit and its resolution has been increased to 240 × 160. It also adds the ability to fast forward and rewind video; the first model only allowed for skipping between scenes. It is backwards compatible with the original model's PVDs, though the image is cropped to accommodate for the Color's wider resolution. It uses 107 mm (4.2 in) discs, which would become the standard size of PVDs throughout the line's lifespan.
- VideoNow Jr. - The third model, released by subsidiary Playskool on October 16, 2004. It is a variation of the VideoNow Color designed for preschoolers, with a more childish design, rubberized corners, bigger buttons for ease of use, and two eject hatches which have to be pulled at the same time to minimize the risk of opening the disc tray and touching the laser by accident. PVDs made under the VideoNow Jr. brand are also flexible in order to prevent them from breaking when bent. Despite this, they are functionally identical to a VideoNow Color PVD, and can be played on a VideoNow Color or the later model XP. Likewise, the VideoNow Jr. player is compatible with VideoNow Color PVDs.
- VideoNow XP - The fourth model, released on August 15, 2005. It uses a clamshell design, has a larger screen than the VideoNow Color, albeit at the same resolution, and was designed with basic gaming functionality, featuring four separated directional buttons and two face buttons labeled "A" and "B". A few dedicated VideoNow XP games were made, though all of them were interactive movies with gameplay consisting entirely of quick time events, similar to Laserdisc-based arcade games such as the Advanced Microcomputer Systems developed- and Don Bluth animated- Dragon's Lair and Space Ace. Standard PVDs released during the XP's lifespan would also feature a simple trivia game with questions about the episode included, which could only be played on the XP. Should a PVD game be put into any other model, the content will play in the order it is stored on the disc.
- VideoNow Color FX - The fifth and final model, released in 2006. It is virtually identical to the VideoNow Color in both functionality and form factor; the only difference between the two is that the Color FX uses translucent plastic as opposed to the opaque plastic used for the original Color model.

=== Special editions ===
- Kool-Aid Red VideoNow (only available through Kool-Aid Kool Points)
- SpongeBob Exclusive Edition Video Now Color (for the release of The SpongeBob SquarePants Movie)

== Accessories ==
- VideoNow Light- a light accessory made for the original VideoNow to allow for viewing in dim lighting conditions. It requires a separate AA battery.
- Carrying Case- made to store the VideoNow and 5 PVDs in. There are 4 types, one for each model.
- VideoNow-branded headphones were available with a standard 3.5 mm audio jack.
- VideoNow Media Wizard- a basic editing software used to make custom PVDs to play on a Color/fx, XP, and Jr., released in 2005. Hasbro made recordable PVDs available without the Media Wizard from their online store. A number of unofficial solutions are available for creating the oddly-formatted VideoNow files, including a plug-in for the video processing program Virtual Dub. The files can then be burned to a CD-R using standard CD burning software, and the disc cut down to the required size.
- VCamNow- a VideoNow-branded camcorder that came with a copy of the Media Wizard.

== Titles ==
Most of the available shows were from Nickelodeon, including SpongeBob SquarePants and The Fairly OddParents. Later, content from Cartoon Network was also released, featuring titles such as Ed, Edd n Eddy and Dexter's Laboratory. Disney contributed more limited content, primarily episodes of America’s Funniest Home Videos, along with a single PVD each featuring a music video for Hannah Montana, The Cheetah Girls, and High School Musical. A small number of movies were also released on the system, such as Agent Cody Banks and its sequel, but due to the limited space on a PVD, said movies would have to be released on at least three discs, depending on the length of said film.

Certain titles were created specifically for VideoNow, such as The Story of Star Wars, as well as interactive movie-style games for the VideoNow XP.

=== VideoNow ===
- 4Kids Entertainment Mix (Sonic X / Kirby: Right Back at Ya! / The Cramp Twins / Teenage Mutant Ninja Turtles)
- Agent Cody Banks (full movie)
- Agent Cody Banks 2 (behind the scenes extras only)
- All Grown Up! (Truth or Consequences)
- Aly & AJ
  - "Rush"
  - "No One"
- Amanda Show
- America's Funniest Home Videos
  - "Crazy Cats"
  - "Dimwitted Dogs and Their Nimcompoop Owners"
- American Idol
- Avatar: The Last Airbender
- The Basil Brush Show (UK only)
- The Batman
  - "The Laughing Bat"
  - "Ragdolls To Riches"
  - "Batman vs Joker"
- Ben 10 ("Tourist Trap")
- Beyblade
- Black Eyed Peas
  - "Let's Get It Started"
- Bowling for Soup
  - "1985" / "Girl All The Bad Guys Want"
- Britney Spears
  - "...Baby One More Time" / "Stronger"
  - "Toxic" / "Oops!... I Did It Again"
- Camp Lazlo ("No Beads, No Business" / "Miss Fru Fru")
- Cartoon Network Mix Volume 1 (Ed, Edd n Eddy / Johnny Bravo / Codename: Kids Next Door)
- Cartoon Network Mix Volume 2 (Dexter's Laboratory / The Powerpuff Girls / Codename: Kids Next Door)
- Cartoon Network Mix Volume 3 (Hi Hi Puffy AmiYumi / Ben 10 / Camp Lazlo / My Gym Partner's a Monkey)
- CatDog
- Catscratch
  - "Tale of the Tail" / "Mr. Pickles"
- ChalkZone
  - "The Heist" / "Battle of The Hands" / "Chocolate Brunch" / "Oh My My"
- Cheer! Show Your Spirit
- Codename: Kids Next Door ("Operation: ROBBERS" / "Operation: UTOPIA")
- Danny Phantom
  - "One Of A Kind"
  - "Parental Bonding"
  - "Splitting Images"
- Dexter's Laboratory (UK only; "Blackfoot and Slim" / "Trapped With a Vengeance" / "The Parrot Trap")
- Drake and Josh
  - "Dune Buggy"
  - "First Crush"
- E! Hollywood Yearbook: Class of 2005
- Ed, Edd n Eddy ("Will Work for Ed" / "Ed, Ed, and Away")
- Emma Roberts: Behind the Scenes with Emma Roberts
- Fear Factor
  - "Halloween"
  - "Ferris Wheel, Fear Factor Pizza, Water Platform"
  - "Bobbing in Blood, Tomato Hornworms, Skunk Tunnel"
  - "Airplane Walk, Snake Face Off, Car Launch"
  - "Helicopter Slalom, Maggoty Cheese, Flag Snag"
  - "Tunnel Swim, Eat Balut, Bike Plank"
  - "Freefall Jump, Eating Sheep Eyes, Water Tank"
  - "Dog Attack, Snake Pit, Beam Walk"
  - "Semi Truck Jump, Worm Pit, Bungee Paintball"
- Foster's Home for Imaginary Friends
- Hannah Montana
  - "Best of Both Worlds" / "Who Said"
- Hi Hi Puffy AmiYumi ("Ami's Secret" / "Taffy Trouble" / "Dance a Go-Go")
- Hilary Duff
  - On the Road with Hilary Duff
  - "A Day In My Life"
  - "Come Clean"
  - "Fly"
  - "Hilary Around The World"
  - "So Yesterday"
- Jackie Chan Adventures
  - "Mask of El Toro Fuerte"
  - "Dog and Piggy Show"
  - "Queen of the Shadowkhan"
- Jamie Lynn Spears: A Weekend with Jamie Lynn Spears
- Jesse McCartney
  - Backstage with Jesse McCartney'
  - "She's No You"
  - "Beautiful Soul"
- Kirby: Right Back at Ya! ("Kirby's Egg-Cellent Adventure")
- Monsters Garage
  - "Low Ridin Rodeo"
  - "Hot Dogster"
  - "Snowmobile"
  - "Ultimate Halfpipe"
  - "Skool Bus Pontoon Boat"
  - "Rock Crawler"
- Mr. Bean: The Animated Series (UK and Germany only)
- My Gym Partner's a Monkey ("Amazon Kevin" / "Grub Drive")
- My Life as a Teenage Robot
  - "Return of the Raggedy Android" / "The Boy Who Cried Robot"
  - "See No Evil" / "Great Unwashed"
- Ned's Declassified School Survival Guide ("Teachers" / "Detention")
- Nick Mix (from Volume 16)
  - Nick Mix Volume 7 (My Life as a Teenage Robot / Jimmy Neutron: Boy Genius / The Fairly OddParents)
  - Nick Mix Volume 8 (The Amanda Show / Romeo! / The Brothers Garcia)
  - Nick Mix Volume 9 (Romeo! / Ned's Declassified School Survival Guide / The Brothers Garcia)
  - Nick Mix Volume 10 (Danny Phantom / Rocket Power / Jimmy Neutron: Boy Genius)
  - Nick Mix Volume 11 (Unfabulous / The Amanda Show / The Brothers Garcia)
  - Nick Mix Volume 12 (My Life as a Teenage Robot / Rugrats / The Fairly OddParents)
  - Nick Mix Volume 13 (Chalkzone / Jimmy Neutron: Boy Genius / The Fairly OddParents)
  - Nick Mix Volume 14 (SpongeBob SquarePants / Chalkzone / Rocket Power)
  - Nick Mix Volume 15 (Drake and Josh / Unfabulous / Taina)
  - Nick Mix Volume 16 (CatDog / SpongeBob SquarePants / Rocket Power)
- Peanuts (movies only)
  - A Boy Named Charlie Brown
  - Snoopy Come Home
- The Powerpuff Girls
- Raven-Symoné
  - "Backflip"
  - "Past, Present & Beyond"
- Rocket Power
  - "Super Mcvarial" / "Loss of Squid"
  - "Otto's Big Break" / "Big Air Dare"
- Romeo!
  - "Write Me a Hit"
  - "He Got Blame"
- Scooby-Doo, Where Are You!
  - "The Rage Backstage"
  - "Never Ape an Ape Man"
  - "What the Hex Is Going On?"
  - "Scooby-Doo and a Mummy Too!"
  - "Spooky Space Kook"
  - "Go Away Ghost Ship"
  - "Which Witch Is Witch"
  - "A Clue for Scooby-Doo"
  - "Hassle in the Castle"
  - "Jeepers, It's the Creeper"
- Simple Plan
- SpongeBob SquarePants
  - "Sailor Mouth" / "Artist Unknown"
  - "Grandmas Kisses" / "Squidville"
  - "Secret Box" / "Band Geeks"
  - "F.U.N." / "Squidward, The Unfriendly Ghost"
  - "Fools in April" / "Neptune's Spatula"
  - "As Seen on TV" / "Can You Spare a Dime"
  - "Krab Borg" / "Rock-A-Bye Bivalve"
  - "Prehibernation Week" / "Life of Crime"
  - "The Bully" / "Just One Bite"
  - "Something Smells" / "Bossy Boots"
  - "Dying for Pie" / "Imitation Krabs"
  - "Pressure" / "The Smoking Peanut"
  - "Welcome to the Chum Bucket / "Frankendoodle"
  - "Jellyfish Hunter" / "Fry Cook Games"
  - "Procastination" / "I'm With Stupid"
  - "Sleepytime" / "Suds"
- Superstars of the NBA
- Teen Titans (Tournament of Champions)
- Teenage Mutant Ninja Turtles ("Bishop's Gambit")
- The Adventures of Jimmy Neutron: Boy Genius
  - "Party at Neutron's" / "Ultra Sheen"
  - "Jimmy on Ice" / "Battle of the Bands"
  - "Brobot" / "Big Pinch"
- The Fairly OddParents
  - "Chin Up" / "Dog's Day Afternoon"
  - "Ms. Dimmsdale" / "Mind Over Magic"
  - "Boy Toy" / "Inspection Detection"
  - "Action Packed" / "Smarty Pants"
  - "Information Stupor Highway"
  - "Hard Copy" / "Parent Hoops"
  - "Which Witch Is Witch" / "Kung Timmy"
  - "The Same Game" / "Dreamgoat"
- The Story of Star Wars
- The Wild Thornberrys
  - "Legend of Ha Long Bay"
- Tony Hawk's Secret Skate Park Tour
- Transformers
- Unfabulous
  - "The Rep"
  - "The List of Kissed"
- Usher
  - "Caught Up" / "U Remind Me"
- Vanessa Carlton
  - "White Houses"
- What's New Scooby-Doo
- Winx Club ("Miss Magix")
- Yu-Gi-Oh! ("The ESP Duelist", Parts 1 and 2)
- Zoey 101 ("New Roomies")
- Zoids
  - "Festival of Grave Men"
  - "Survival"
  - "Track Of Zero"

=== VideoNow Jr. ===
- Angelina Ballerina: "The Rose Fairy Princess" / "The Lucky Penny" (Release Date: October 16, 2004)
- Barney & Friends
  - A Counting We Will Go! (Release Date: October 16, 2004)
  - Once Upon a Fairy Tale (Release Date: October 16, 2004)
  - Who’s Your Neighbor? (Release Date: October 16, 2004)
  - Squares, Squares Everywhere (Release Date: October 16, 2004)
  - A World of Friends (Release Date: October 16, 2004)
  - A Perfectly Purple Day (Release Date: October 16, 2004)
- Bob the Builder
  - "Scoop Saves the Day" / "Muck Gets Stuck" (Release Date: October 16, 2004)
- Blue's Clues
  - "The Legend of the Blue Puppy" (Release Date: October 16, 2004)
  - "Shape Searchers" (Release Date: October 16, 2004)
  - "Blue's Big Band" (Release Date: October 16, 2004)
  - "Puppets" (Release Date: January 4, 2005)
- Clifford the Big Red Dog
  - "Teacher's Pet" / "Clifford and the Beanstalk" (Release Date: October 16, 2004)
  - "Little Clifford" / "Welcome to Birdswell Island" (Release Date: October 16, 2004)
  - "The Dog Park" / "And Birdy Makes Three" (Release Date: October 16, 2004)
  - "Great Race" / "Short-Changed" (Release Date: October 16, 2004)
  - "Dog House Rock" / "Stage Struck" (Release Date: October 16, 2004)
- Clifford's Puppy Days
  - "Jorge and the Dog Run" / "Clifford's Clubhouse" (Release Date: October 16, 2004)
  - "Friends of All Ages" / "Clifford's Super Sleepover" (Release Date: October 16, 2004)
  - "Socks and Snooze" / "Monsters in 3B" (Release Date: October 16, 2004)
- Dora the Explorer
  - "Dora Had a Little Lamb" (Release Date: January 4, 2005)
  - "Backpack!" (Release Date: October 16, 2004)
  - "Wizzle Wishes" (Release Date: October 16, 2004)
  - "Berry Hunt" (Release Date: October 16, 2004)
  - "Lost and Found" (Release Date: October 16, 2004)
- LazyTown ("Sports Day") (Release Date: January 4, 2005)
- Nick Jr. - A Wonderful World Sampler (Dora the Explorer / Blue's Clues Promotional Material) (Release Date: October 16, 2004)
- Nick Jr. Bests #1 (Dora the Explorer / Blue's Clues / Max & Ruby) (Release Date: October 16, 2004)
- Nick Jr. Bests #2 (Oswald / Blue's Clues / Little Bill) (Release Date: October 16, 2004)
- Nick Jr. Bests #3 (Dora the Explorer / Little Bill / Max & Ruby) (Release Date: October 16, 2004)
- Nick Jr Bests #4 (Dora the Explorer / Blue's Room (Beyond Your Wildest Dreams) / LazyTown) (Release Date: January 4, 2005)
- Oswald ("Friends Indeed" / "Sammy Starfish Live") (Release Date: October 16, 2004)
- Sesame Street
  - "Grover's Popcorn Stand" (Release Date: October 16, 2004)
  - "Hide and Seek on Sesame Street" (Release Date: October 16, 2004)
  - "Elmo Reads a Book" (Release Date: October 16, 2004)
  - "The Mail It Shop Opens on Sesame Street" (Release Date: October 16, 2004)
  - "Zoe Takes Trombone Lessons" (Release Date: October 16, 2004)
  - "In Search of the Letter Y" (Release Date: October 16, 2004)
- Thomas & Friends
  - Thomas' Rescue Adventures ("Thomas to the Rescue" / "James Goes Too Far" / "You Can Do It, Toby" / "Percy and the Magic Carpet") (Release Date: Mid 2005)
- The Wiggles
  - "Murray's Shirt" (Release Date: October 16, 2004)
  - "Jeff the Mechanic" (Release Date: October 16, 2004)
  - "Haircut" (Release Date: October 16, 2004)
  - "Anthony's Friend" (Release Date: October 16, 2004)

== See also ==
- VCamNow
- ChatNow
- TVNow
- Hasbro
- Tiger Electronics
- Game Boy Advance Video
- Juice Box
