= Zhoukou East railway station =

Railway station in Zhoukou, Henan

Zhoukou East 周口东
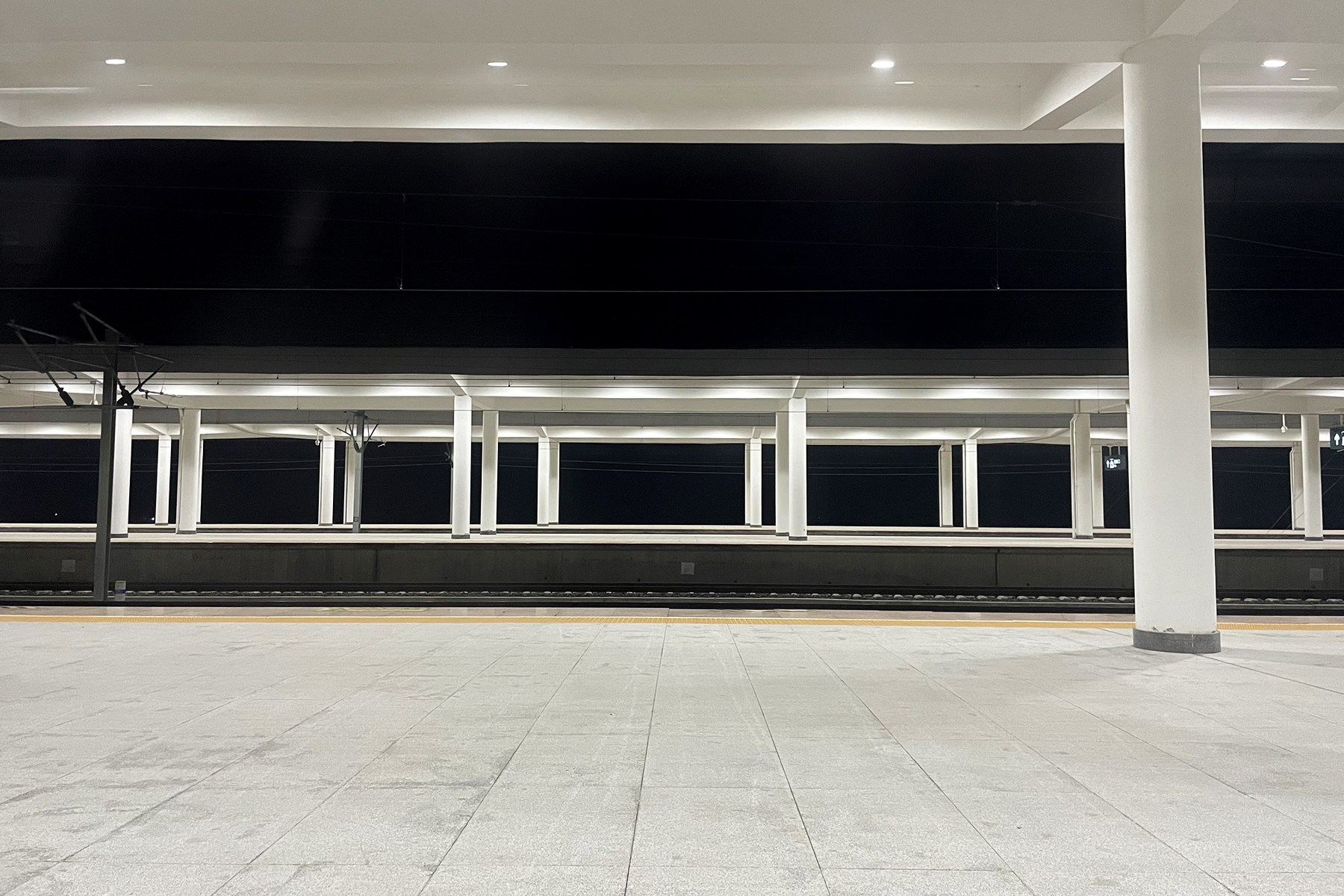

General information
- Location: Chuanhui District, Zhoukou, Henan; China
- Coordinates: 33.647200°N 114.741570°E
- Line(s): Zhengzhou–Fuyang high-speed railway; Pingdingshan–Luohe–Zhoukou high-speed railway (planned)
- Platforms: 6

History
- Opened: 1 December 2019
Location

Zhoukou East railway station (Chinese: 周口东站; pinyin: Zhōukǒudōng zhàn) is a railway station in Chuanhui District, Zhoukou, Henan, China. It opened on 1 December 2019. It is an intermediate stop on the Zhengzhou–Fuyang high-speed railway and will be the eastern terminus of the planned Pingdingshan–Luohe–Zhoukou high-speed railway.

There are three island platforms (for six platform faces total) and two bypass lines without platforms.

Preceding station	China Railway High-speed	Following station
Xihua towards Zhengzhou	Zhengzhou–Fuyang high-speed railway	Huaiyang South towards Fuyang West
