= Pingdingshan West railway station =

Railway station in Henan, China

Pingdingshan West 平顶山西

General information
- Location: Baofeng County and Xinhua District border, Pingdingshan, Henan; China
- Coordinates: 33°49′05.84″N 113°04′48.36″E
- Operated by: China Railway Zhengzhou Group
- Lines: Zhengzhou–Wanzhou high-speed railway Pingdingshan–Luohe–Zhoukou high-speed railway (planned)

History
- Opened: 1 December 2019
Location

Pingdingshan West railway station is a railway station on the border of Baofeng County and Xinhua District, Pingdingshan, Henan, China. It opened with the first stage of the Zhengzhou–Wanzhou high-speed railway on 1 December 2019.

The name Pingdingshan West was used by another station, however, this station had its name changed to Baofeng railway station in July 2019.

| Preceding station | China Railway High-speed | Following station |
|---|---|---|
| Jiaxian towards Zhengzhou East | Zhengzhou–Wanzhou high-speed railway | Fangcheng towards Wanzhou North |
