= Zhouzhuang (disambiguation) =

Zhouzhuang or Zhou Zhuang might refer to:

== Places ==
There are four towns named Zhouzhuang (周庄镇) in China:

- Zhouzhuang, Baofeng County, in Baofeng County, Henan
- Zhouzhuang, Jiangyin, in Jiangyin City, Jiangsu
- Zhouzhuang, Kunshan, Jiangsu
- Zhouzhuang, Xinghua, Jiangsu, in Xinghua City, Jiangsu

== People ==
- Zhuang Zhou, Chinese philosopher
