= Call box =

Special purpose telephone

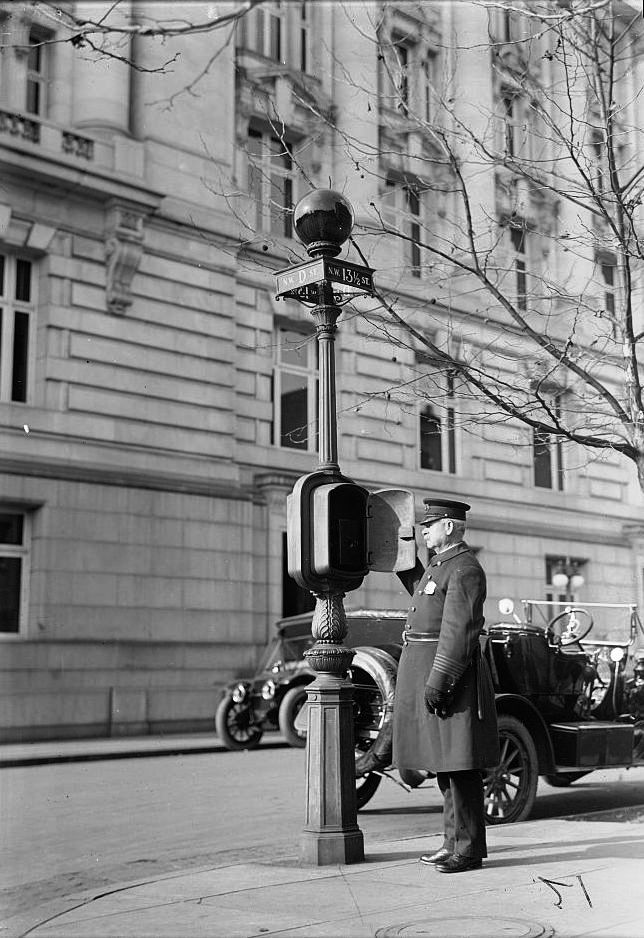
Police callbox, Washington, D.C., 1912

A call box or callbox is a box, usually metal, containing a special-purpose direct line telephone or other telecommunications device which has been used by various industries and institutions as a way for employees or clients at a remote location to contact a central dispatch office.

== Uses ==
=== Police and taxicab dispatching ===
Some taxi companies used callboxes before the introduction of two-way radio dispatching as a way for drivers to report to the dispatch office and receive customer requests for service. Taxi callboxes were installed at taxicab stands, where taxis would queue for trips.

Also, before the introduction of two-way radios, some police agencies installed callboxes or "police boxes" at street locations as a way for beat officers to report to their dispatch office. Before the development of emergency telephone numbers and the proliferation of mobile phones, some firefighting agencies installed callboxes at various street locations so that a pedestrian or driver spotting a fire could quickly report it.

=== Railroad ===
A related device is a trackside telephone, a communication unit that is located along the route of a railroad. These may be wired landline phones or wireless ones. Rail networks have this type of phone installed so that rail operating centres and trackside users can communicate.

=== Retail ===
A growing number of retailers use call boxes in their stores as a way for shoppers to summon service (Shopper Call Box) as well as for store employees to summon assistance (Director Call Box). Retail call boxes are generally wireless devices that communicate to in-store communication devices via radio frequency (303 MHz) or through 802.11 networks.

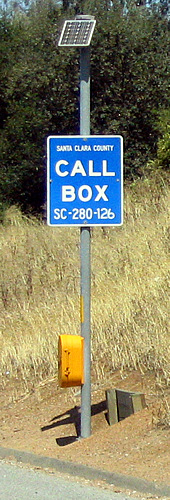
Call box in California

=== Motorist aid ===
Call boxes also exist at regular intervals along the sides of many highways and rapid transit lines around the world, where drivers or passengers can use them to contact a control centre in case of an accident or other emergency. These call boxes are often marked by a blue strobe light which flashes briefly every few seconds. Boxes in remote areas often now have solar cells to power them.

US highways with callboxes have included most of the major highways in California, Florida's Turnpike and Interstate 185 in Georgia. Rather than a telephone, these devices simply have four buttons to push: blue for accident or other emergency (send police/fire/medical), green for major service (mechanical breakdown, send a tow truck), black for minor service (out-of-gas or flat tire), and yellow for cancel. Roads in other places may have voice call boxes, though these are more expensive and must either be wired long distances, or rely on spotty rural mobile phone service.

Many cellular callboxes in California now include a TTY interface for hearing-impaired users.

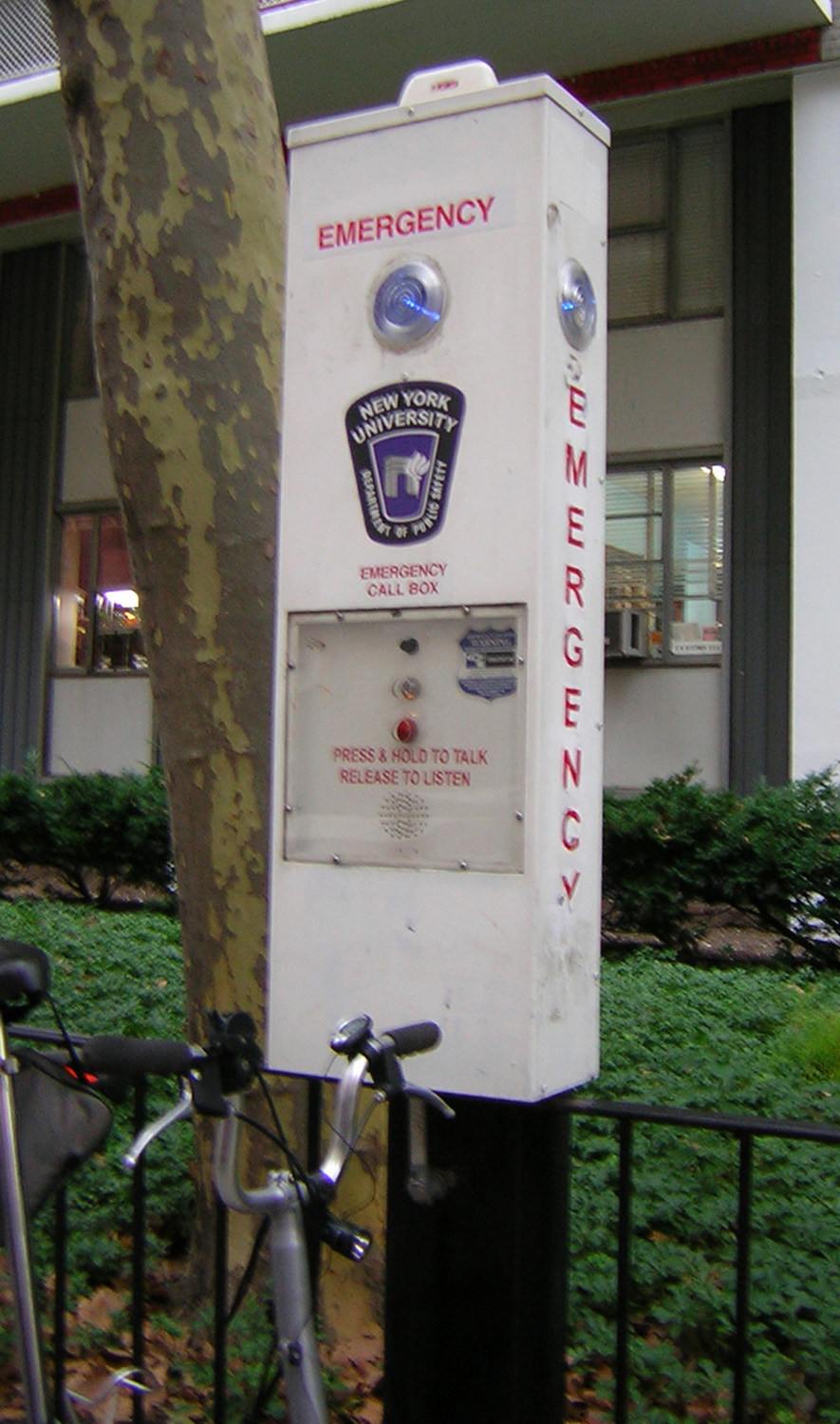
New York University callbox

Call boxes have the advantage that their location is immediately known, while mobile phone users in trouble do not necessarily know where they are. In California, a cellular call to 911 connects to the California Highway Patrol, whereas a callbox will connect to a dedicated regional answer center. The DTMF automatic number identification (ANI) or caller ID from the callbox will be used to display the callbox sign number and its location on the computer-aided dispatch (CAD) system.

An emergency callbox can also have a secondary function as a remote terminal unit (RTU). Experimental systems deployed around Sacramento, California, were used to connect fog sensors and closed-circuit television using the cellular transceiver within the callbox.

==== Decline in usage ====
In California, freeway callboxes were used about 98,000 times in 2001. That number dropped by 80 percent to 19,600 times in 2010, or about 1 call per box per month. The cost of callboxes for the Service Authority for Freeways and Expressways (SAFE) program in the San Francisco Bay area is $1.7 million annually. As a result, since 2009 approximately half of the callboxes have been removed from certain California highways, preferentially leaving them only in places where cell phone coverage is poor.

Florida previously had callboxes installed at one-mile intervals along all its Interstate Highways as well as Florida's Turnpike. These boxes were all removed by 2014 after a 65-percent decrease in usage over an eight-year period, in line with increased mobile phone usage. The boxes were costing the state roughly $1 million per year to keep operational.

The Pennsylvania Turnpike Commission, which operates all of the toll roads in Pennsylvania and is a separate agency from the state's main transportation agency, operated emergency call boxes along all of its roadways from 1988 to 2017, removing them due to the long-term use of cell phones as well as driver safety. PennDOT itself never used call boxes.

=== Safety ===
On many North American college and university campuses, callboxes are installed at various locations around campus so that students, staff, or visitors can contact campus security in case of an emergency. New York University, for example, hard-wires their call boxes to the university-wide communications system. Other voice call boxes use mobile phone service, and are solar-powered, so no wiring need be extended to the middle of a parking lot or other remote location. As a result, they can function during a power outage if the cell site is still powered.

New York City has a large system of call boxes intended to summon a police or fire department response, where calls are routed to local dispatchers, instead of the general 9-1-1 queue. The New York City Fire Department reports that 2.6 percent of emergency calls they receive originate from call boxes, 88 percent of which are false alarms. City officials have attempted to remove the callboxes, but in 2011 federal judge Robert W. Sweet denied the City's request to lift an injunction preventing their removal.

== Wireless call boxes ==
Call boxes may be either wired or wireless. Wireless systems use radio frequencies in the VHF or UHF business band radio spectrum. Many callboxes can be programmed to be compatible with virtually any brand of VHF or UHF business band portable or fixed-base radio. Many in the United States require an FCC license, but some are certified for use on special FCC license-free business frequencies.

If the required distance is greater than the range of the wireless call box, an external antenna can extend the range. In the FCC-licensed frequency range, radio repeaters can extend this range even more.

A wireless call box that runs on solar power can be truly wireless, since no power lines need to be run to it.

== History ==
In the United States, the Gamewell Company of Newton, Massachusetts, manufactured fire alarm call boxes, beginning in the 1880s. These would telegraph a location code to the central fire station when a lever was pulled in the box.

Although it is difficult to determine when and where the earliest highway emergency phones were developed, undoubtedly one of the earliest examples were the freeway phones developed in Western Australia in 1966. This system was developed by Alan Harman, an employee of a Western Australian security firm, Central Station Security Company, Electronic Signals Pty Ltd, who came up with the idea after reading of a pile-up on the Kwinana Freeway. The newspaper article mentioned that assistance had been difficult to provide to those involved in the pile-up. The system Harman envisaged was a series of telephone units in a box on a short post, spaced at 160-metre intervals (520 ft) along Perth's freeways. Picking up the handset would trigger an alarm in the Main Roads control centre and police, fire or ambulance could then be determined by the caller. Harman developed the system with the approval of the main roads commissioner and chief engineer, by adapting the existing design of communication facilities used at the security firm in which he worked.

== See also ==
- Telephone booth
