= Zhengzhou–Fuyang high-speed railway =

Railway line in China

Overview
- Status: Operational
- Owner: China Railway
- Locale: Henan and Anhui provinces, China
- Termini: Zhengzhou East; Fuyang West

Service
- Type: High-speed railway, Passenger dedicated railway
- Operator(s): CR Zhengzhou Group & CR Shanghai Group

History
- Opened: 1 December 2019

Technical
- Line length: 276 km (171 mi)
- Track gauge: 1,435 mm (4 ft 8 1/2 in)
- Electrification: 50 Hz 25 kV（AC）
- Operating speed: Design 350 km/h (217 mph); Initial 300 km/h (186 mph)

The Zhengzhou–Fuyang high-speed railway is a high-speed passenger-dedicated railway between Zhengzhou in Henan province, and Fuyang in Anhui province on China's central plain. It opened on 1 December 2019.

The 276 km (171 mi) line starts from Zhengzhou East, there are 9 intermediate stations and the line terminates at Fuyang West.

== List of stations ==
- Zhengzhou Hangkonggang
- Xuchang North
- Yanling
- Fugou South
- Xihua
- Zhoukou East
- Huaiyang South
- Shenqiu North
- Jieshou South
- Linquan
- Fuyang West

== Description ==
In December 2019, there were 9 trains per day in each direction along the line, the fastest time between the terminals is now 1 hour 22 minutes (train G1955) the slowest direct train on the line takes 1 hour and 55 minutes (train G3182). There are alternative high-speed trains between the terminals via Shangqiu which are almost as fast, for example G3170 takes 2 hours and 2 minutes.
