= Pingdingshan–Luohe–Zhoukou high-speed railway =

Railway line under construction in Henan, China

Overview
- Native name: 平漯周高速铁路
- Status: Open
- Locale: Henan, China
- Termini: Pingdingshan West; Zhoukou East
- Stations: 6

Service
- Type: High-speed rail
- System: China Railway
- Operator: CR Zhengzhou Group

Technical
- Line length: 200 km (120 mi)
- Track gauge: 1,435 mm (4 ft 8 1/2 in) standard gauge
- Minimum radius: 7,000 m (23,000 ft) (general); 5,500 m (18,000 ft) (difficult)
- Electrification: 25 kV AC
- Operating speed: 350 km/h (217.5 mph) (max)
- Signalling: Automatic block
- Maximum incline: 2% (general) (general); 2.5% (difficult)

The Pingdingshan–Luohe–Zhoukou high-speed railway, abbreviated as Pingluozhou high-speed railway (Chinese: 平漯周高速铁路; pinyin: Píngluòzhōu gāosù tiělù), is a planned high-speed railway line in Henan, China. The line will have a length of 199.7 kilometres (124.1 mi) and a maximum speed of 350 kilometres per hour (220 mph).

== Stations ==
| Station Name | Chinese |
|---|---|
| Pingdingshan West | 平顶山西 |
| Pingdingshan South | 平顶山南 |
| Wuyang North | 舞阳北 |
| Luohe West | 漯河西 |
| Zhoukou West | 周口西 |
| Zhoukou East | 周口东 |
