= Game Boy Advance Video =

Video format for Game Boy Advance (2004-2007)

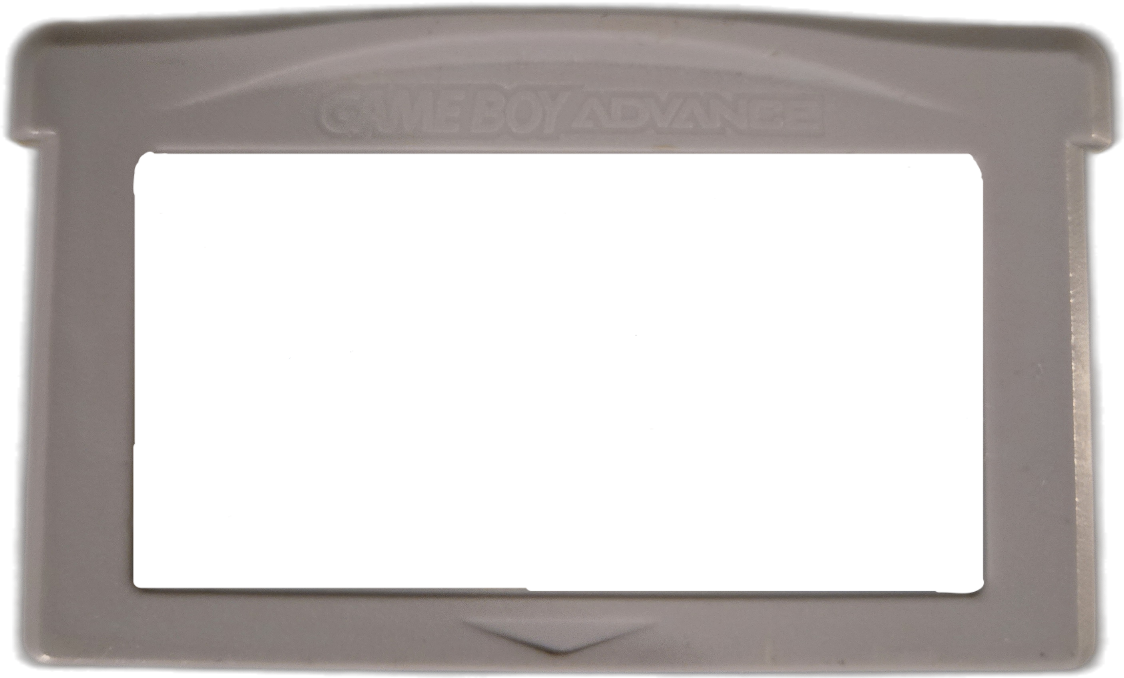
- A Game Boy Advance Video Pak. The light grey coloring serves to distinguish it from regular Game Paks.
- Media type: ROM cartridge
- Capacity: 32 MB (TV episodes); 64 MB (movies)
- Developed by: Majesco, Nintendo
- Usage: Home video, feature films
- Released: May 12, 2004
- Discontinued: 2007

Game Boy Advance Video is a discontinued format for putting full color, full-motion videos onto Game Boy Advance (GBA) ROM cartridges. These videos are playable using the Game Boy Advance system's screen and sound hardware. Each cartridge contained up to 45 minutes of animated series episodes or, in select cases, a 90-minute film. A total of 35 Game Boy Advance Video Paks were published between 2004 and 2006.

The Game Boy Advance Video Paks were primarily published by Majesco, with the exception of those based on Pokémon, which were published by Nintendo. Majesco's releases used compression technology developed by DC Studios, Inc., while Pokémon and "Movie Pak" cartridges used the Mobiclip codec developed by Actimagine.

== History ==
In a May 2003 press release, Majesco and DC Studios announced Game Boy Advance Video and would be showcasing the technology at E3 2003; the press release confirmed they were in discussions with multiple studios and planning to launch in Q4 of that year. At the same event, 4Kids Entertainment announced their own line of cartridges containing episodes from their anime properties, known as "GBA-TV", and targeting the same launch window, though none were ever released. In March 2004, Majesco announced Nickelodeon and 4Kids as the first two licensors for the GBA Video line. Further licensing deals with Cartoon Network, DIC Entertainment, and Funimation were announced over the following two months.

The first GBA Video Paks launched in North America in May 2004, and initially retailed for a MSRP of US$19.99. In conjunction with the line, Majesco manufactured headphones that could connect to the Game Boy Advance SP through its EXT2 port, as the system lacked a standard headphone jack. By October 2004, 20 different GBA Video paks had been released. At that time, Majesco reported an increase in revenue of nearly US$30 million over their previous year, with 79% of all sales attributed to GBA Video.

In November 2004, Majesco announced a licensing deal to release several Disney animated series for the platform. In July 2005, Majesco announced that three animated films from DreamWorks Animation would receive GBA Movie Pak releases. The final GBA Video release was a compilation cartridge containing two of these films.

== Features ==
SpongeBob SquarePants episode "Pizza Delivery" on Game Boy Advance Video.

Game Boy Advance Video Paks offer the same 240×160 resolution as standard Game Boy Advance games. While playing a video, players can pause, fast forward, rewind, skip between different chapters, adjust the brightness of the footage, or lock the controls to prevent interruption of playback.

Most GBA Video Paks have a storage capacity of 32MB (megabytes); Movie Paks use a special chipset to allow 64MB of memory, larger than any other commercially-released GBA game. Due to this small capacity and the length of the video content, GBA Video Paks are heavily compressed, with significant video artifacting. The Shrek & Shark Tale Movie Pak also had to reduce the screen resolution to 240×112 to fit both films on one cartridge.

In order to prevent piracy of the included content using a VCR or other recording device, Game Boy Advance Video Paks are not compatible with the GameCube's Game Boy Player accessory; attempting to play one on the device only displays an error message.

== List of published titles ==
A total of 35 Game Boy Advance Video Paks were released. Most contain 2–4 episodes of an animated series, totalling about 45 minutes, while some contain full 90 minute films. The following titles and episodes were released on Game Boy Advance Video.

Game Boy Advance Video Paks
Title	Release date	Episodes	Ref
The Adventures of Jimmy Neutron, Boy Genius: Volume 1	June 30, 2004	"Brobot"; "The Big Pinch"; "Granny Baby"; "Time is Money"	
All Grown Up!: Volume 1	May 27, 2004	"Susie Sings the Blues"; "Coup DeVille"	
Cartoon Network Collection: Volume 1	July 6, 2004	The Grim Adventures of Billy & Mandy — "Crawling Niceness"; Johnny Bravo — "The Perfect Gift"; Ed, Edd n Eddy — "Stop, Look and Ed"; Courage the Cowardly Dog — "Magic Tree of Nowhere"	
Cartoon Network Collection: Volume 2	October 15, 2004	Courage the Cowardly Dog — "Courage the Fly"; Johnny Bravo — "Balloon Platoon"; The Grim Adventures of Billy & Mandy — "Mandy the Merciless"; Codename: Kids Next Door — "Operation T.U.R.N.I.P."	
Cartoon Network Collection: Premium Edition	November 10, 2004	Courage the Cowardly Dog — "The Shadow of Courage"; Ed, Edd n Eddy — "A Glass of Warm Ed"; Johnny Bravo — "Cookie Crisis"; Dexter's Laboratory — "Double Trouble"	
Cartoon Network Collection: Special Edition	November 30, 2004	The Grim Adventures of Billy & Mandy — "Billy and the Bully"; Dexter's Laboratory — "Dexter's Rival"; Ed, Edd n Eddy — "Oath to an Ed"; Johnny Bravo — "Beach Blanket Bravo"	
Cartoon Network Collection: Limited Edition	December 31, 2004	Courage the Cowardly Dog — "The Queen of the Black Puddle"; Ed, Edd n Eddy — "Key to My Ed"; Dexter's Laboratory — "The Big Sister"; Codename: Kids Next Door — "Operation M.I.N.I.G.O.L.F."	
Cartoon Network Collection: Platinum Edition	April 15, 2005	Courage the Cowardly Dog — "Cowboy Courage"; Ed, Edd n Eddy — "The Luck of the Ed"; The Grim Adventures of Billy & Mandy — "A Grim Surprise"; Codename: Kids Next Door — "Operation T.O.M.M.Y."	
Codename: Kids Next Door: Volume 1	July 6, 2004	"Operation N.O.-P.O.W.U.H."; "Operation R.E.P.O.R.T."; "Operation B.R.I.E.F."; "Operation D.O.G.F.I.G.H.T."	
Disney Channel Collection: Volume 1	December 24, 2004	Kim Possible — "Ron the Man"; Lilo & Stitch — "Slushy"	
Disney Channel Collection: Volume 2	April 4, 2005	Lilo & Stitch — "Poxy"; Kim Possible — "Rufus in Show"; Brandy & Mr. Whiskers — "To The Moon Mr. Whiskers"	
Dora the Explorer: Volume 1	May 14, 2004	"Three Little Piggies"; "The Big River"	
Dragon Ball GT: Volume 1	September 9, 2004	"A Grand Problem"; "Pan's Gambit"	
The Fairly OddParents: Volume 1	May 14, 2004	"Foul Balled"; "The Boy Who Would Be Queen"; "Information Stupor Highway"	
The Fairly OddParents: Volume 2	May 14, 2004	"Father Time"; "Apartnership"; "Ruled Out"; "That's Life!"	
Nicktoons Collection: Volume 1	June 22, 2004	All Grown Up! — "Chuckie's In Love"; The Fairly OddParents – "The Big Problem"; SpongeBob SquarePants — "Pizza Delivery"	
Nicktoons Collection: Volume 2	September 20, 2004	Rocket Power — "Big Air Dare"; The Fairly OddParents — "Odd Ball"; SpongeBob SquarePants — "Nature Pants"; SpongeBob SquarePants — "Opposite Day"	
Nicktoons Collection: Volume 3	April 4, 2005	Danny Phantom — "Attack of the Killer Garage Sale"; The Fairly OddParents — "Tim Visible"; SpongeBob SquarePants — "Squeaky Boots"	
The Proud Family: Volume 1	March 15, 2005	"Tween Town"; "Twins to Tweens"	
Pokémon: Volume 1	June 21, 2004	"A Hot Water Battle"; "For Ho-Oh The Bells Toll!"	
Pokémon: Volume 2	June 21, 2004	"Playing with Fire"; "Johto Photo Finish"	
Pokémon: Volume 3	September 27, 2004	"Pokémon, I Choose You!"; "Here Comes the Squirtle Squad"	
Pokémon: Volume 4	September 27, 2004	"Beach Blank-Out Blastoise"; "Go West, Young Meowth"	
Shark Tale	October 26, 2005	Feature film	
Shrek (Note: Shrek and Shrek 2 were also released in a physical bundle containing both cartridges.)	October 31, 2005	Feature film	
Shrek 2	October 31, 2005	Feature film	
Shrek & Shark Tale	September 8, 2006	Shrek; Shark Tale	
Sonic X: A Super Sonic Hero	May 20, 2004	"Chaos Control Freaks"; "Sonic to the Rescue"	
SpongeBob SquarePants: Volume 1	May 14, 2004	"Hall Monitor"; "Jellyfish Jam"; "Jellyfishing"; "Plankton!"	
SpongeBob SquarePants: Volume 2	May 14, 2004	"Mermaid Man & Barnacle Boy"; "Pickles"; "Bubblestand"; "Ripped Pants"	
SpongeBob SquarePants: Volume 3	November 30, 2004	"Texas"; "Walking Small"; "Hooky"; "Mermaid Man & Barnacle Boy II"	
Strawberry Shortcake: Volume 1	May 20, 2004	"Meet Strawberry Shortcake" (Note: Majesco and DC Studios also included the GBA Video version of "Meet Strawberry Shortcake" as a bonus feature in the Special Edition re-release of Strawberry Shortcake: Summertime Adventure (2004).); "Spring for Strawberry Shortcake"	
Super Robot Monkey Team Hyperforce Go!: Volume 1	April 4, 2005	"Depths of Fear"; "Planetoid Q"	
Teenage Mutant Ninja Turtles: Things Change	July 21, 2004	"Things Change"; "A Better Mousetrap"	
Yu-Gi-Oh!: Yugi vs. Joey	July 21, 2004	"Friends 'Til the End, Part 3"; "Friends 'Til the End, Part 4"	

=== Cancelled titles ===
Five additional Game Boy Advance Video Paks were advertised, but never saw release:

Cancelled Game Boy Advance Video Paks
Title	Episodes	Ref
Dragon Ball GT: Volume 2	Unknown	
Sonic X: Chaos Emerald Chaos	"Missile Wrist Rampage"; "Chaos Emerald Chaos"	
Strawberry Shortcake: Volume 2	Unknown	
Teenage Mutant Ninja Turtles: The Shredder Strikes	"The Shredder Strikes, Part 1"; "The Shredder Strikes, Part 2"	
Yu-Gi-Oh!: Noah's Final Threat	"Noah's Final Threat, Part 1"; "Noah's Final Threat, Part 2"	

Other unreleased series mentioned in marketing material include Kirby: Right Back at Ya! and The Powerpuff Girls.

== See also ==
- Nintendo Video
- Juice Box
- Universal Media Disc
- VideoNow
