= Juice Box =

Low-cost multimedia player

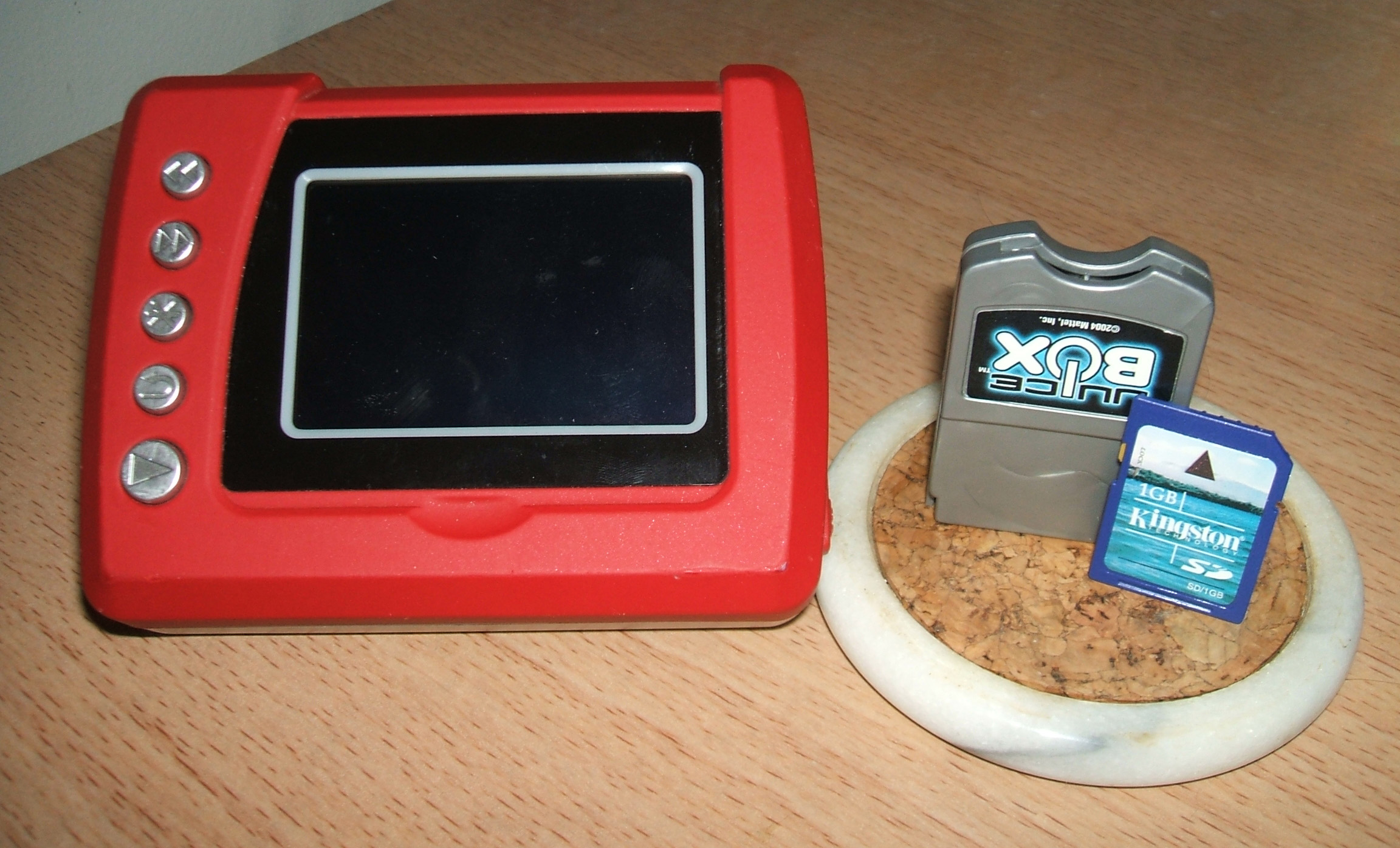
- JuiceBox player in red, with a 1 GB SD card and adapter
- Media type: Flash ROM
- Capacity: 16 or 32 MB
- Developed by: Mattel
- Usage: Home video, music videos, MP3 player and photo viewer (Note: via Juice Box MP3 and Photo Viewer)
- Released: October 17, 2004
- Discontinued: Early 2005

The Juice Box is a low-cost multimedia player made by toy manufacturer Mattel. The player features a 2.7 in (6.9 cm) screen with a native resolution of 240×160 px and a palette of 4,069 colors, with videos playing at 15 to 18 frames per second. It was released on October 17, 2004 at a retail price of US$70, and it was discontinued in early 2005.

The device was marketed as a portable media player for children, and it used a proprietary JuiceWare cartridge format, which could store 16 or 32 MB of video content. Cartridges with 64 MB were announced, but never released. It mainly competed against the VideoNow series by Hasbro-owned Tiger Electronics, the Game Boy Advance Video (GBA Video) format by Majesco and Nintendo, and the PlayStation Portable (PSP) UMD Video format by Sony. The JuiceWare library consisted of 14 TV shows, 12 documentaries, one Mattel-owned movie (My Scene: Jammin' in Jamaica) and 10 music video compilations. Competitors offered larger libraries with a wider variety of content, although several JuiceWare titles were not released on competing devices.

Juice Box players run μClinux, a microcontroller version of the Linux kernel. The device uses a 66 MHz ARM7TDMI architecture Samsung processor S3C44B0, 2 or 8 MB of RAM, and 8 MB of ROM. The Juice Box MP3 and Photo Viewer includes an SD card adapter and 32 MB card, which allows the device to play MP3 audio files at up to 128 kbit/s or photos converted to the proprietary JBP format, though audio and photos cannot be played simultaneously. Officially, an SD card of up to 512 MB is supported, but cards with 1 or 2 GB may also work.

== Programming ==
=== Cartoon Network ===
- Codename: Kids Next Door
  - "Operation: F.L.A.V.O.R." and "Operation: K.I.S.S." (Episode 19)
  - Volume 1 (Episodes 24 and 27)
- Courage the Cowardly Dog (Volume 1)
- Dexter's Laboratory
  - "Dyno-Might" and "LABretto" (Episode 51)
  - Volume 1 (Episodes 14 and 37)
- Ed, Edd n Eddy
  - "Don't Rain on My Ed" and "Once Bitten Twice Ed" (Episode 39)
  - Volume 1 (Episodes 16a, 21a and 33)
- The Grim Adventures of Billy and Mandy
  - Volume 1 (Episodes 17 and 25)
- Johnny Bravo
  - Volume 1 (Episodes 10a, 10c, 3a and 12)
- Megas XLR
  - Volume 1 (Episodes 1 and 3)
- The Powerpuff Girls
  - Volume 1 (Episodes 19 and 30)

=== 4Kids ===
- Sonic X
  - "Missile Wrist Rampage" (Episode 3)
- Teenage Mutant Ninja Turtles
  - "The Ultimate Ninja" (Episode 36)
  - Volume 1 ("The Shredder Strikes" – Episodes 10 and 11)
- Winx Club
  - Volume 1 (Episodes 1 and 2)
  - "Save the First Dance" (Episode 3)
- Yu-Gi-Oh!
  - "Friends 'Til the End" (Episodes 75 to 78)
  - "Clash in the Coliseum — Part 1" (Episode 129)

The first two episodes of "Friends 'Til the End" from Yu-Gi-Oh! were each released on a 16 MB JuiceWare chip. The final two episodes were released together as "Yu-Gi-Oh! Volume 1" on a 32 MB chip. The final two episodes were also released on the competing Game Boy Advance Video format as a 32 MB cartridge, with a second release including French audio instead of English.

=== Discovery Channel ===
- Motorcycle Mania
- Trading Spaces

=== My Scene ===
- My Scene: Jammin' in Jamaica

=== Documentaries ===
- Jerry Rice: The Ultimate Wide Receiver
- Drake Bell: A Day with Drake
- Good Times with Carey Hart
- Brett Favre: The Field General
- Streetball Classics (Volumes 1 and 2)
- Vans Pipeline Masters (Volume 1)
- Vans Triple Crown
  - Volume 1 (BMX)
  - Volume 2 (Skateboarding)
- World Wrestling Entertainment (WWE)
  - Hard Knocks: The Chris Benoit Story
  - My Name is Eugene
  - Rey Mysterio: 619-Style

=== Music videos ===
Cartridges are 32 MB, unless otherwise indicated.

No.	Title	Artist
1.	"Predictable"	Good Charlotte
2.	"Collide"	Howie Day
3.	"Let Me Love You"	Mario
4.	"I Don't Want to Be"	Gavin DeGraw
5.	Talk Shows on Mute	Incubus

No.	Title	Artist
1.	"Shadow"	Ashlee Simpson
2.	"The End of the World"	The Cure
3.	"White Houses"	Vanessa Carlton
4.	"Geek Love"	Fan 3
5.	"Pieces of Me"	Ashlee Simpson
Note: This is a 32 MB cartridge. A 16 MB variant was also released, limited to tracks 1 and 5.

No.	Title	Artist
1.	"Extraordinary"	Liz Phair
2.	"Stuck"	Stacie Orrico
3.	"Tangled Up in Me"	Skye Sweetnam
4.	The Making of "Tangled Up in Me"	Skye Sweetnam
5.	"You Get Me"	ZOEgirl
Note: This is a 32 MB cartridge. A 16 MB variant was also released, which omits tracks 4 and 5.

No.	Title	Artist
1.	"I Love This Bar"	Toby Keith
2.	"Who's Your Daddy?"	Toby Keith
3.	"Beer for My Horses"	Toby Keith
4.	"Cool to Be a Fool"	Joe Nichols
5.	"Last One Standing"	Emerson Drive

No.	Title	Artist
1.	"My Happy Ending"	Avril Lavigne
2.	"Don't Tell Me"	Avril Lavigne
3.	"Our Lives"	The Calling
4.	"The Way"	Clay Aiken
5.	"Superstar"	Ruben Studdard
Note: This is a 32 MB cartridge. A 16 MB variant was also released, featuring tracks 1 and 3 in addition to "Invisible" by Clay Aiken.

No.	Title	Artist
1.	"Why Can't I?"	Liz Phair
2.	"Extraordinary"	Liz Phair
3.	"(There's Gotta Be) More to Life"	Stacie Orrico
4.	"Girl on the Verge"	Sarah Hudson
5.	"Walkie Talkie Man"	Steriogram

No.	Title	Artist
1.	"Move It Like This"	Baha Men
2.	"Do Ya"	Jump5
3.	"Spinnin' Around"	Jump5
4.	"I Was Only (Seventeen)"	Beu Sisters
5.	"Dismissed"	ZOEgirl

No.	Title	Artist
1.	"Live Those Songs"	Kenny Chesney
2.	"No Shoes, No Shirt, No Problems"	Kenny Chesney
3.	"I Go Back"	Kenny Chesney
4.	"Suds in the Bucket"	Sara Evans
5.	"This One's for the Girls"	Martina McBride

No.	Title	Artist
1.	"Walkie Talkie Man"	Steriogram
2.	"Get This Party Started"	tobyMac
3.	"Chapstick, Chapped Lips, and Things Like Chemistry"	Relient K
Note: This is a 16 MB cartridge.

No.	Title	Artist
1.	"You Get Me"	ZOEgirl
2.	"All I Can Do"	Jump5
3.	"Spinnin' Around"	Jump5
4.	"Who Let the Dogs Out"	Baha Men
5.	"Eternal Flame"	Atomic Kitten

== See also ==
- VideoNow
- Game Boy Advance Video
