= Baofeng Lake =

Baofeng Lake 宝峰湖
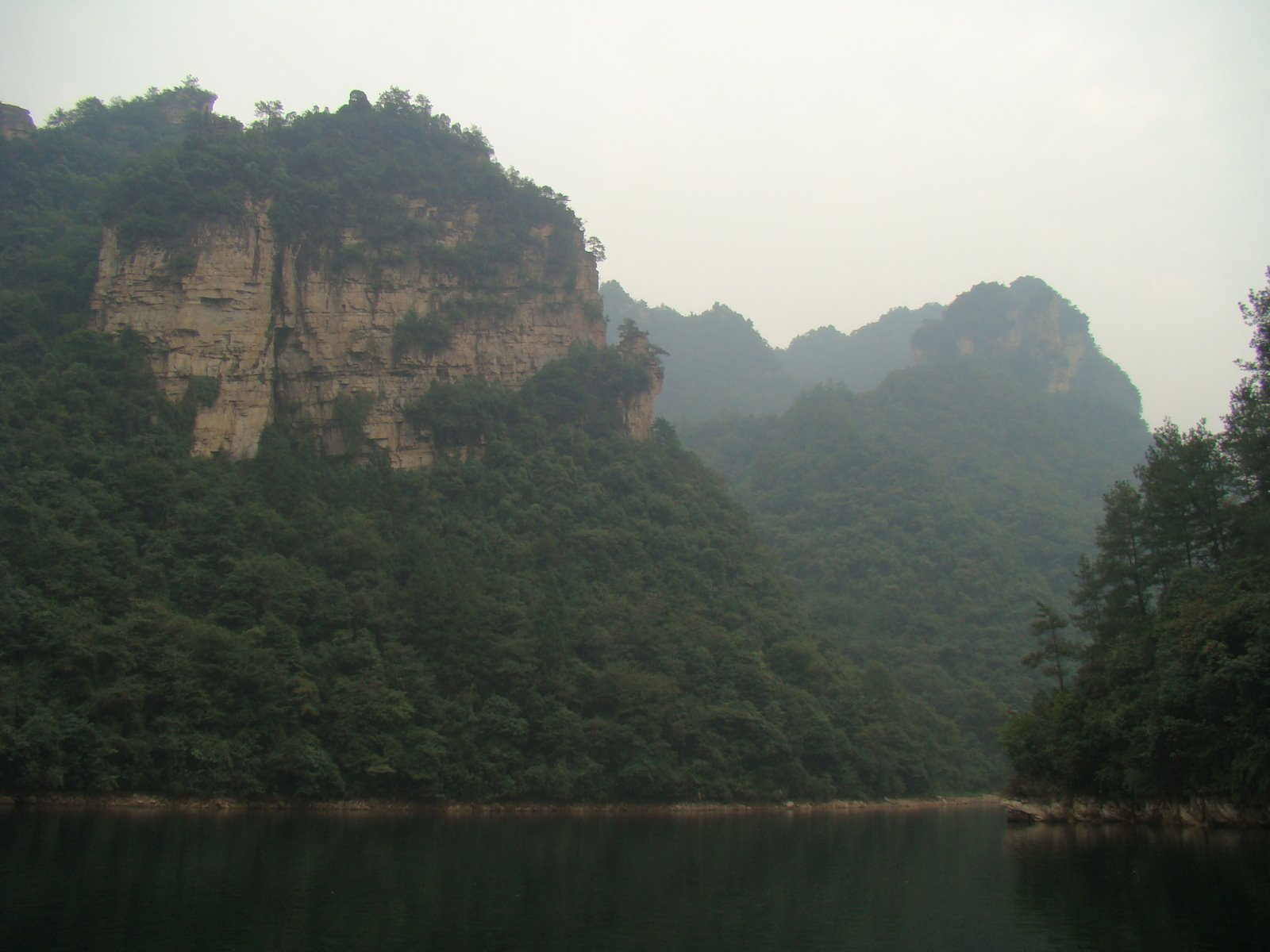

- Location within Hunan
- Location: Wulingyuan Scenic Area, Wulingyuan District, Hunan Province, China
- Coordinates: 29°19′21.1″N 110°33′10.1″E
- Type: Artificial lake
- Max. length: 2.5 km (1.6 miles)
- Average depth: 72 m (236 ft)

Baofeng Lake (Chinese: 宝峰湖), also spelled Baofeng Hu, is an artificial fresh-water lake in the Wulingyuan Scenic Area located on the south side of Suoxiyu Village, Wulingyuan District, Zhangjiajie City, Hunan, China. It was created in the 1970s.

The lake is an artificial reservoir that is created by blocking gorge and building dam, its average depth is 72 metres (236 ft), length is 2.5 kilometres (1.6 miles), and it is surrounded by forested stone peaks.

Baofeng Lake is one of the filming locations for the TV series Journey to the West and Wulong Mountain Suppression of Bandits.

== History ==
In the 1970s, Suoxiyu's local villagers built dams to generate electricity, which inadvertently created a lake. The lake was named Baofeng Lake because it is backed by the Baofeng Mountain.
