= Baofeng (company) =

Chinese radio communication company

'Fujian Baofeng Electronics Co., Ltd'
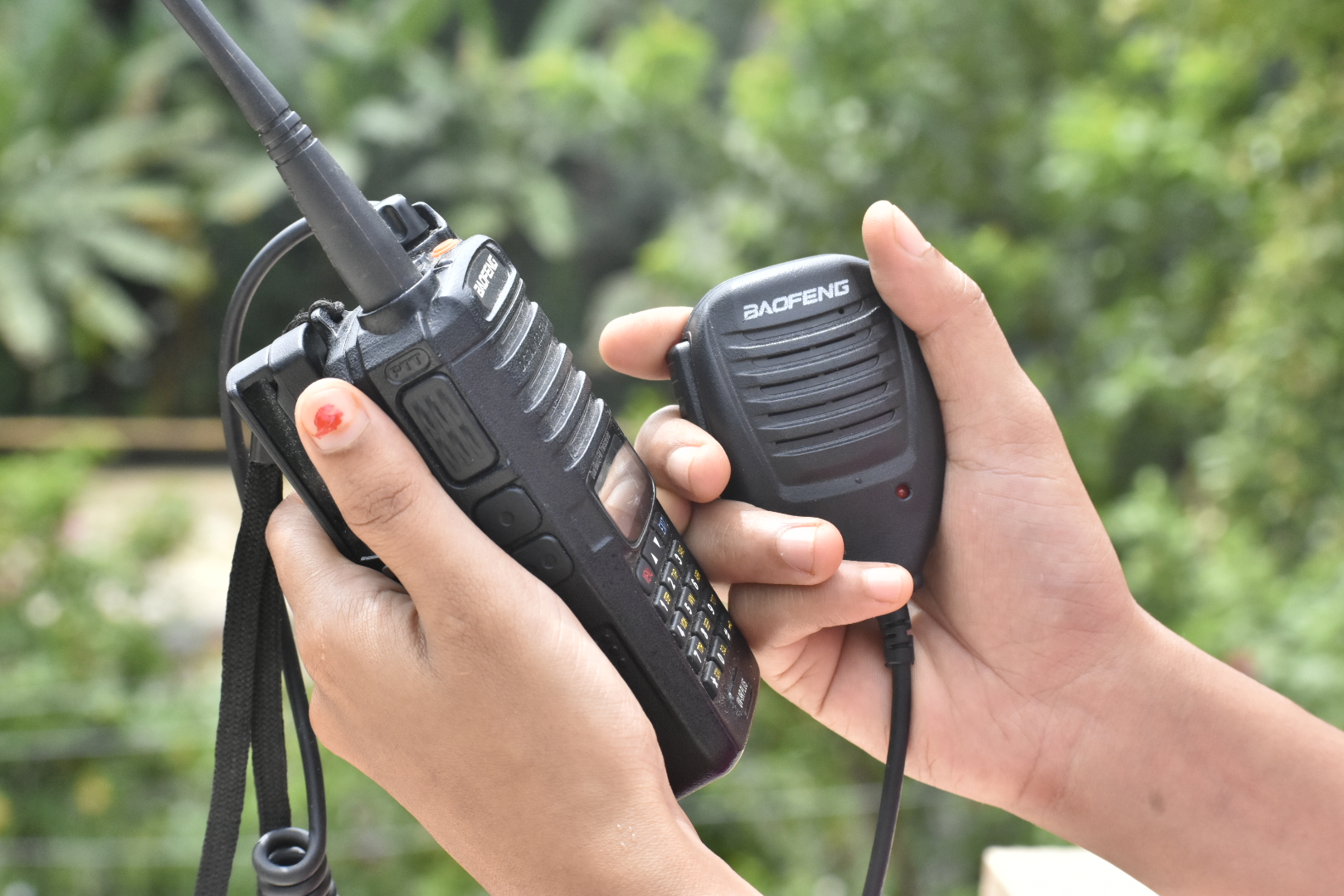
- Native name: 宝锋
- Industry: Electronics
- Founded: 2001; 25 years ago (as Baoan Electronics Co., Ltd.)
- Founder: Wang Jinding
- Headquarters: Nan'an, Fujian, China
- Products: Radio equipment and accessories
- Website: baofengradio.com

Fujian Baofeng Electronics Co., Ltd (Chinese: 宝锋 or 寶鋒, romanized: Bǎo fēng), known as Baofeng, is a Chinese company which develops and sells walkie-talkies, radios, ham radio equipment, and their accessories.

== History ==
In 2001, Wang Jinding founded the company as Baoan Electronics Co., Ltd. in Nan'an County (Chinese: 南安, romanized: Nán'ān) in Fujian Province (Chinese: 福建, romanized: Fújiàn). From that time onward, the company gradually expanded its marketshare and entered new markets, for example it was certified to enter the EU market in April 2011. In 2019, the company adopted its current name, 'Fujian Baofeng Electronics Co., Ltd.'

== Products ==
Baofeng mainly offers portable equipment in the HF, VHF, and UHF bands, both handheld transceiver (HT) and traditional transceiver models. Its offerings include Amateur Radio Service, General Mobile Radio Service, and Family Radio Service models.

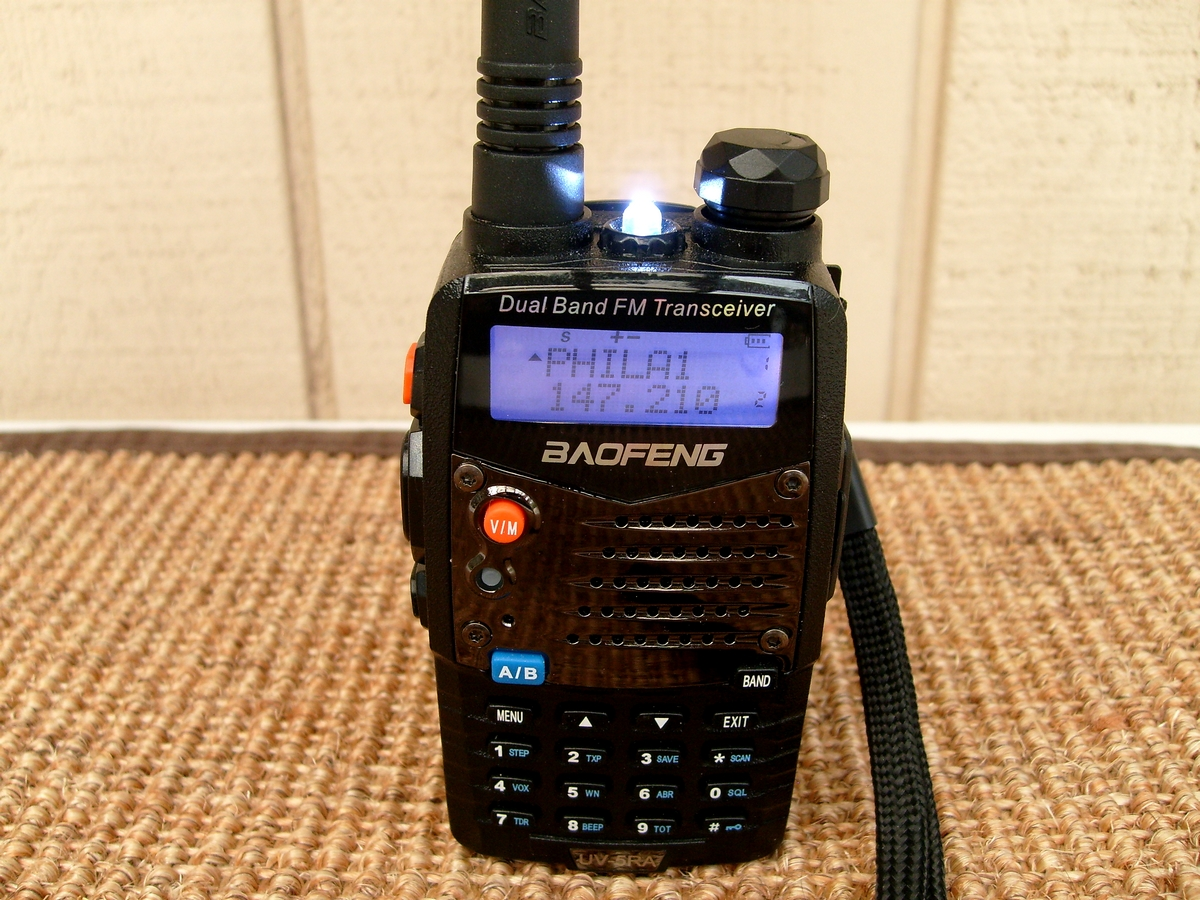
Baofeng UV-5RA.

== Popularity ==
In recent years, Chinese amateur radio transceivers have exploded in popularity among amateur radio operators due to their lower cost than comparable offerings from traditionally dominant companies in the amateur radio space, such as Kenwood, Icom, and Yaesu.

In 2025, the American Radio Relay League, the main organizing body for Amateur Radio in the United States, even published a book on the use of Baofeng offerings.

== Russo-Ukrainian War ==
Baofeng radios have been noted for their use in the Russian invasion of Ukraine. Radios such as the Baofeng UV-82 have been recovered from Russian soldiers in Ukraine. Unlike military radios, the UV-82, and other popular Baofeng consumer radios, are not hardened against electronic warfare (EW).

== Regulatory Compliance ==
The Federal Communications Commission (FCC) regulates radio emissions in the United States, the second-largest Amateur Radio market in the world by the number of licensed amateurs. In 2018, the FCC issued an enforcement advisory against the sale of two-way radios capable of operations outside of prescribed frequency bands. This came on the heels of an enforcement action by the FCC against an importer of Baofeng radios, which, at the time, were capable of out-of-the-box operation on a number of different bands not allocated to the Amateur Radio Service.

In the early 2020s, Baofeng, often tested to be non-compliant with many FCC frequency emission regulations in the United States, began to address these compliance issues. Baofeng models introduced at that time attempted to mitigate issues with spurious emissions that had become associated with Baofeng radios.
