= Fuyang West railway station (Anhui) =

Railway station in Fuyang, Anhui, China

Fuyang West 阜阳西站
- Station building

General information
- Other names: Fuyangxi
- Location: Yingzhou District, Fuyang, Anhui; China
- Coordinates: 32.88519°N 115.74791°E
- Operator: China Railway Shanghai Group
- Lines: Shangqiu–Hangzhou high-speed railway Zhengzhou–Fuyang high-speed railway Huaibei–Fuyang intercity railway (planned)
- Platforms: 7 (2 side, 5 island)

Other information
- Station code: TMIS code: 19343; Telegraph code: FXU; Pinyin code: FYX

History
- Opened: 1 December 2019
Location

Fuyang West railway station (Chinese: 阜阳西站) is a high-speed railway station in Yingzhou District, Fuyang, Anhui. It was opened in December 2019. The station is an interchange between the Shangqiu–Hangzhou high-speed railway and the Zhengzhou–Fuyang high-speed railway.

The station is situated a few hundred metres away from Fuyang Xiguan Airport however no direct transfer exists.

Preceding station	China Railway High-speed	Following station
Taihe East towards Shangqiu	Shangqiu–Hangzhou high-speed railway	Yingshang North towards Tonglu
Linquan towards Zhengzhou	Zhengzhou–Fuyang high-speed railway	Terminus

== See also ==
- Fuyang railway station, main conventional railway station serving Fuyang
