= Business band =

Area of the radio spectrum

In the United States, the business band is the colloquial name used by radio users who utilize and scanner hobbyists who listen to the Federal Communications Commission (FCC) Industrial/Business pool frequencies. The regulations listing frequencies in this pool are contained in Subpart C of Part 90, Title 47 of the CFR.

== Overview ==
The pool describes a series of frequencies on the VHF and UHF two-way radio bands. They are reserved for use by companies and individuals operating commercial activities; educational, philanthropic, or ecclesiastical institutions; clergy activities; or hospitals, clinics, or medical associations. In the United States, use of these frequencies requires a license issued by the U.S. FCC. The exceptions to this are five specific frequencies that are also part of the Multi-Use Radio Service (MURS), which permits unlicensed operation on these frequencies, provided the output power does not exceed 2 watts. Other frequency bands, such as Citizens Band Radio (CB radio) and Family Radio Service (FRS), may also be used without a license.

Channels are available in several frequency ranges to suit the users' requirements for propagation and protection from interference. The electromagnetic spectrum between approximately 450 and 470 MHz is used largely for UHF business communications, although this spectrum is not exclusively for business use. In some large metropolitan areas, such as New York, the UHF-T band (between 470 and 512 MHz) is also used due to congestion on the standard VHF or UHF bands. There are also a number of specific frequencies, in both the VHF and UHF spectrums, that are for business use; some of these have color-coded names, such as Red Dot or Blue Star.

In 2004, the FCC required all CFR 47 Part 90 VHF (150–174 MHz) and UHF (421–470 MHz) PLMR (Private Land Mobile Radio) licensees operating legacy wideband (25 kHz bandwidth) voice or data/SCADA systems to migrate to narrowband (12.5 kHz bandwidth or equivalent) systems by January 1, 2013.

== History ==
The Private Land Mobile Radio Service (47CFR90, or Part 90 of the FCC Rules) was established in the US in 1927 to permit commercial and public safety uses of two-way radio by commercial entities and non-Federal government agencies. Similar allocations are available in other countries. The available frequencies in the US have traditionally been separated into two pools. One is for industrial and business users, including some special categories such as petroleum, manufacturing, and forestry; the other is for public safety including medical, police, fire, and others. The industrial and business frequencies, sometimes also known as "business band radio," and the eligibility requirements are listed in 47CFR90.35. Frequencies are licensed on a non-exclusive basis, although fixed stations and mobiles operating in a defined area are issued licenses only following frequency coordination to assure equitable sharing of bandwidth. Anyone conducting commercial business or a number of other activities is eligible for a license.

Other general-purpose two-way radio services with simplified licensing requirements have also been established over the years in the US, including GMRS and CB, the latter now being licensed by rule so that users don't need individual licenses. FRS and MURS are similar pools of frequencies that do not require individual licenses in the US.

== Frequency charts ==
Although the term "business band" refers to several discrete frequencies that are not grouped into a single band, examples of some of the frequencies are grouped by band and listed below. These charts also list other frequencies that are not specifically part of the "business band" but are commonly used by businesses. An individual license is still required under GMRS rules. A few manufacturers added these DOT frequencies to Business radios in the 1990s to have more "channels" and aid in selling radios. Part 90 (Business) and Part 95 (GMRS) frequencies are not interchangeable and are not to be used under the same guidelines. Each has different criteria for licensing. Part 95 GMRS frequencies are not "Itinerant", nor business band frequencies.

=== Low-band frequencies ===
Note: the 27.555 MHz, 27.615 MHz, 27.635 MHz, 27.655 MHz, 27.765 MHz and 27.860 MHz frequencies have no active licenses for any of them. No expired, canceled or terminated licenses exist in the FCC database, indicating that legal users have abandoned the 27.555 MHz - 27.86 MHz frequencies for at least 30 years.

27.430 MHz, 27.450 MHz, 27.470 MHz and 27.490 MHz all are actively used by current business radio license holders, however.

The 25.6 MHz to 28 MHz spectrum is heavily used for unlicensed out of band CB radio communications within the U.S.

Outside of the U.S., numerous additional CB radio allocations exist, including CB radio services that overlap with the 27.54 MHz to 28 MHz allocation, paging systems, land mobile services (outside the U.S.) and additional CB radio allocations exist in the 26 MHz portion as well.

Frequency or range	Notes
25.020-25.320 MHz	20 kHz channel steps, primarily assigned to oil spill cleanup operations
27.430–27.530 MHz	20 kHz channel steps
27.555 MHz	Authorized only in certain areas for forestry and logging operations
27.615 MHz	Authorized only in certain areas for forestry and logging operations
27.635 MHz	Authorized only in certain areas for forestry and logging operations
27.655 MHz	Authorized only in certain areas for forestry and logging operations
27.765 MHz	Authorized only in certain areas for forestry and logging operations
27.860 MHz	Authorized only in certain areas for forestry and logging operations
29.710–29.790 MHz	20 kHz channel steps
30.580–31.960 MHz	20 kHz channel steps, shared with State Forestry in some areas
33.120–33.400 MHz	20 kHz channel steps, some low-power frequencies
35.020–35.980 MHz	20 kHz channel steps, some low-power frequencies
37.440–37.880 MHz	20 kHz channel steps, often used for power and water company communications
42.960–44.600 MHz	20 kHz channel steps, some low-power or itinerant frequencies
47.440–49.580 MHz	20 kHz channel steps

=== VHF frequencies ===
Frequency	Name	Notes
151.505 MHz		Itinerant
151.5125 MHz		Itinerant (narrow band)
151.625 MHz	Red Dot	Itinerant
151.700 MHz		Itinerant
151.760 MHz		Itinerant
151.820 MHz		MURS; 2 watts, 11.25 kHz bandwidth
151.880 MHz		MURS; 2 watts, 11.25 kHz bandwidth
151.940 MHz		MURS; 2 watts, 11.25 kHz bandwidth
151.955 MHz	Purple Dot	
154.515 MHz		
154.5275 MHz		Itinerant (narrow band)
154.540 MHz		
154.570 MHz	Blue Dot	MURS; 2 watts, 20 kHz bandwidth
154.600 MHz	Green Dot	MURS; 2 watts, 20 kHz bandwidth
158.400 MHz		Itinerant
158.4075 MHz		Itinerant (narrow band)

VHF Bands

- 150.830 MHz - 150.965 MHz 7.5kHz steps
- 151.4825 MHz - 151.9925 MHz 7.5kHz spacing except for the MURS channels and frequencies adjacent to the MURS channels
- 152.2625 MHz - 152.480 MHz 7.5kHz spacing may be paired with 157.5225 MHz - 157.740 MHz (5.26 MHz offset, repeater output/base transmit on 152 MHz, repeater input/mobile transmit on 157 MHz. Originally taxi cab radio service.
- 152.8625 MHz - 153.7375 MHz 7.5kHz spacing
- 154.4825 MHz
- 154.490 MHz
- 154.4975 MHz
- 154.505 MHz
- 154.515 MHz
- 154.5275 MHz - itinerant
- 154.540 MHz
- 154.555 MHz - super narrowband
- 154.570 MHz - MURS 4 / Blue Dot
- 154.585 MHz - Oil Spill cleanup only
- 154.600 MHz - MURS 5 / Green Dot
- 154.610 MHz - super narrowband
- 154.625 MHz - On site paging, low power 20w or less
- 154.640 MHz
- 157.500 MHz
- 157.5075 MHz
- 157.515 MHz
- 157.5225 MHz - 157.740 MHz 7.5 kHz spacing, may be paired with 152.2625 - 152.480 MHz. 152.48 and 157.74 MHz are used for low power paging in some areas
- 158.1125 MHz - 158.4375 MHz 7.5 kHz spacing
- 158.445 MHz - Oil Spill Cleanup only
- 158.4525 MHz
- 158.460 MHz
- 159.480 MHz - Oil Spill Cleanup only
- 159.4875 MHz - 160.2075 MHz 7.5 kHz spacing
- 160.215 MHz - 161.610 MHz Railroads only, standardized channel plan. 7.5 kHz spacing

=== UHF frequencies ===
Note: Businesses may be licensed for numerous additional frequencies, 6.25 kHz channel spacing in the following bands

- 451-453 MHz
- 456-458 MHz
- 460.650 MHz - 462.525 MHz
- 462.750 MHz - 462.925 MHz
- 463.225 MHz - 464.9875 MHz
- 465.650 MHz - 467.525 MHz
- 467.750 MHz - 467.925 MHz
- 467.750 MHz - 469.9875 MHz

In repeater systems, +5 MHz offset (split) is used, repeater output frequency on the lower frequency. The 5 MHz offset is standard for 450-470 MHz.

Many business users operate simplex on either frequency, this is legal if the license specifies mobile operation on the given frequency. Other frequencies are designated for low power simplex operation only.

In certain urban areas, additional UHF allocations in the 422-430 MHz band (areas: Buffalo, New York, Detroit, Michigan and Cleveland, Ohio) and/or the 470-512 MHz UHF-T band are also available. These allocations are assigned to other services in the vast majority of the United States.

- Detroit metro area and Cleveland metro area:
- 422.2000 MHz - 422.9875 MHz (input frequencies 427.2000 MHz - 427.9875 MHz) - simplex and duplex repeater pairs
- 424.4000 MHz - 424.9875 MHz (input frequencies 429.4000 MHz - 429.9875 MHz) - simplex and duplex repeater pairs
- 425.0000 MHz - 425.2375 MHz (simplex only)
- Buffalo metro area
- 424.4000 MHz - 424.9875 MHz (input frequencies 429.4000 MHz - 429.9875 MHz) - simplex and duplex repeater pairs
- 425.0000 MHz - 425.2375 MHz (simplex only

Frequency	Name	Notes
462.575 MHz	White Dot	GMRS
462.625 MHz	Black Dot	GMRS
462.675 MHz	Orange Dot	GMRS
464.500 MHz	Brown Dot	Itinerant
464.550 MHz	Yellow Dot	Itinerant
467.850 MHz	Silver Star	
467.875 MHz	Gold Star	
467.900 MHz	Red Star	
467.925 MHz	Blue Star	
469.500 MHz	(Brown dpx)	Itinerant
469.550 MHz	(Yellow dpx)	Itinerant
