= Family Radio Service =

Walkie-talkie radio system in the USA

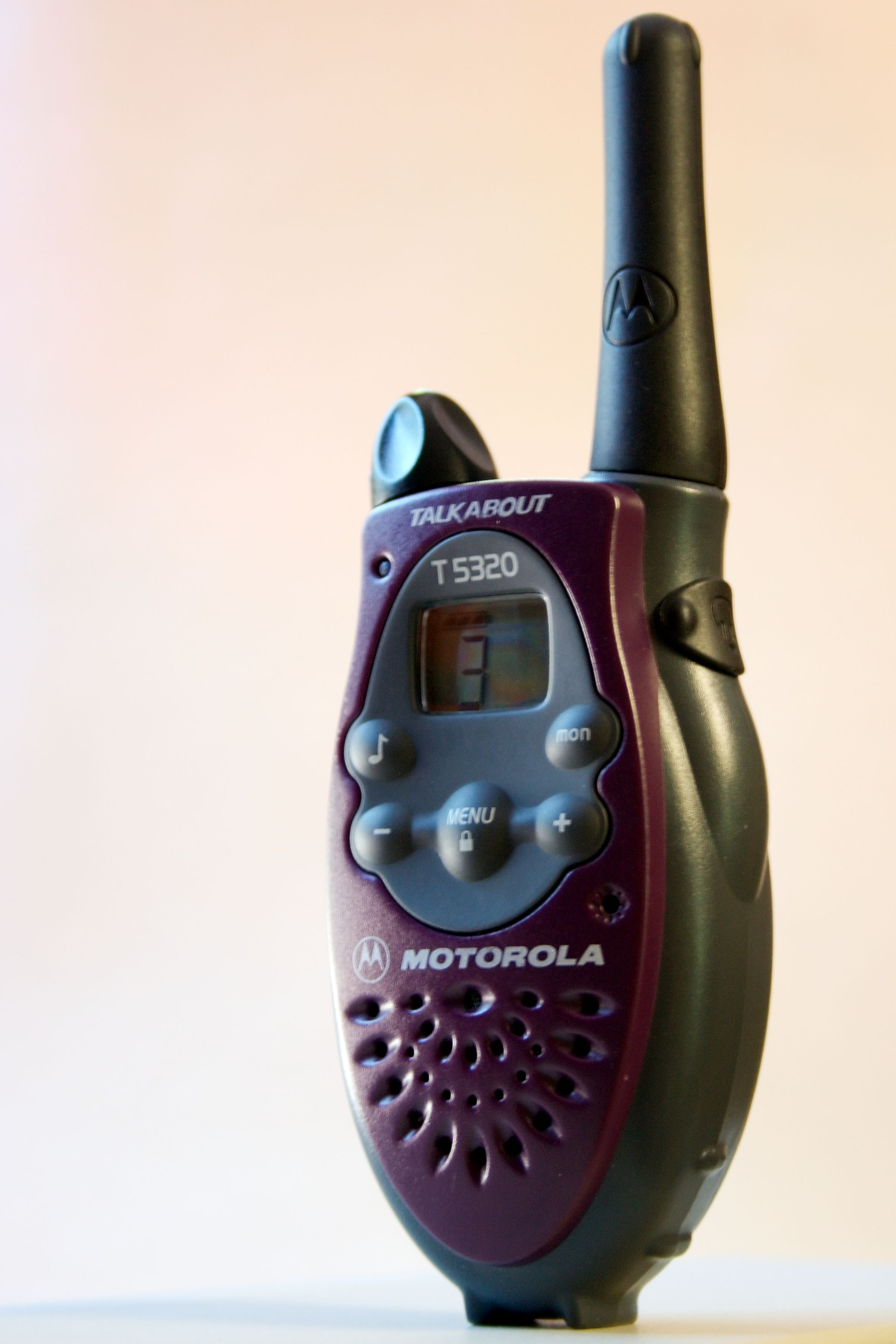
Motorola Talkabout T5320 FRS handheld radio

The Family Radio Service (FRS) is a walkie-talkie radio system authorized in the United States since 1996. This personal radio service uses channelized frequencies around 462 and 467 MHz in the ultra high frequency (UHF) band. It does not suffer the interference effects found on citizens' band (CB) at 27 MHz, or the 49 MHz band also used by cordless telephones, toys, and baby monitors. FRS uses frequency modulation (FM) instead of amplitude modulation (AM). Since the UHF band has different radio propagation characteristics, short-range use of FRS may be more predictable than the more powerful license-free radios operating in the HF CB band.

Initially proposed by RadioShack in 1994 for use by families, FRS gained consumer popularity due to the lack of monthly fees (unlike cell phones) and being inexpensive to buy the radios. It has also seen significant adoption by business interests, as an unlicensed, low-cost alternative to the business band. New rules issued by the FCC in May 2017 clarify and simplify the overlap between FRS and General Mobile Radio Service (GMRS) radio services, GMRS providing a much improved range over FRS.

Worldwide, a number of similar personal radio services exist; these share the characteristics of low power operation in the UHF (or upper VHF) band using FM, and simplified or no end-user licenses. Exact frequency allocations differ, so equipment legal to operate in one country may cause unacceptable interference in another. Radios approved for FRS are not legal to operate anywhere in Europe.

== Technical information ==
FRS radios use narrow-band frequency modulation (NBFM) with a maximum deviation of 2.5 kilohertz. The channels are spaced at 12.5 kilohertz intervals.

All 22 channels are shared with GMRS radios. Initially, the FRS radios were limited to 500 milliwatts across all channels. However, after May 18, 2017, the limit is increased to 2 watts on channels 1-7 and 15–22.

FRS radios frequently have provisions for using sub-audible tone squelch (CTCSS and DCS) codes, filtering out unwanted chatter from other users on the same frequency. Although these codes are sometimes called "privacy codes" or "private line codes" (PL codes), they offer no protection from eavesdropping and are intended only to help reduce unwanted audio when sharing busy channels. Tone codes also do nothing to prevent desired transmissions from being swamped by stronger signals having a different code.

All equipment used on FRS must be certified according to FCC regulations. Radios are not certified for use in this service if they exceed limits on power output, have a detachable antenna, allow for unauthorized selection of transmitting frequencies outside of the 22 frequencies designated for FRS, or for other reasons. After December 2017, the FCC no longer accepts applications to certify hand-held FRS units providing for transmission in any other radio band.

FRS radios must use only permanently attached antennas; there are also table-top FRS "base station" radios that have whip antennas. This limitation intentionally restricts the range of communications, allowing greatest use of the available channels by the community. The use of duplex radio repeaters and interconnects to the telephone network are prohibited under FRS rules.

The range advertised on specific devices might not apply in real-world situations, since large buildings, trees, etc., can interfere with the signal and reduce range. Under exceptional conditions, (such as hilltop to hilltop, or over open water) communication is possible at 60 km (37 mi) or more, but that is rare. Under normal conditions, with line of sight blocked by a few buildings or trees, FRS has an actual range of about 0.5 to 1.5 km (0.31 to 0.93 mi).

== FRS/GMRS hybrid radios ==
In May 2017, the FCC significantly revised the rules for combination FRS/GMRS radios. Combination radios will be permitted to radiate up to 2 watts on 15 of the 22 channels (as opposed to 0.5 watts), and all FRS channels are now considered shared with the GMRS service. Operation over 2 watts, or operation on GMRS repeater input channels, will still require GMRS licensing. The FCC will not certify combination FRS/GMRS radios that exceed the current power limits for the FRS service.

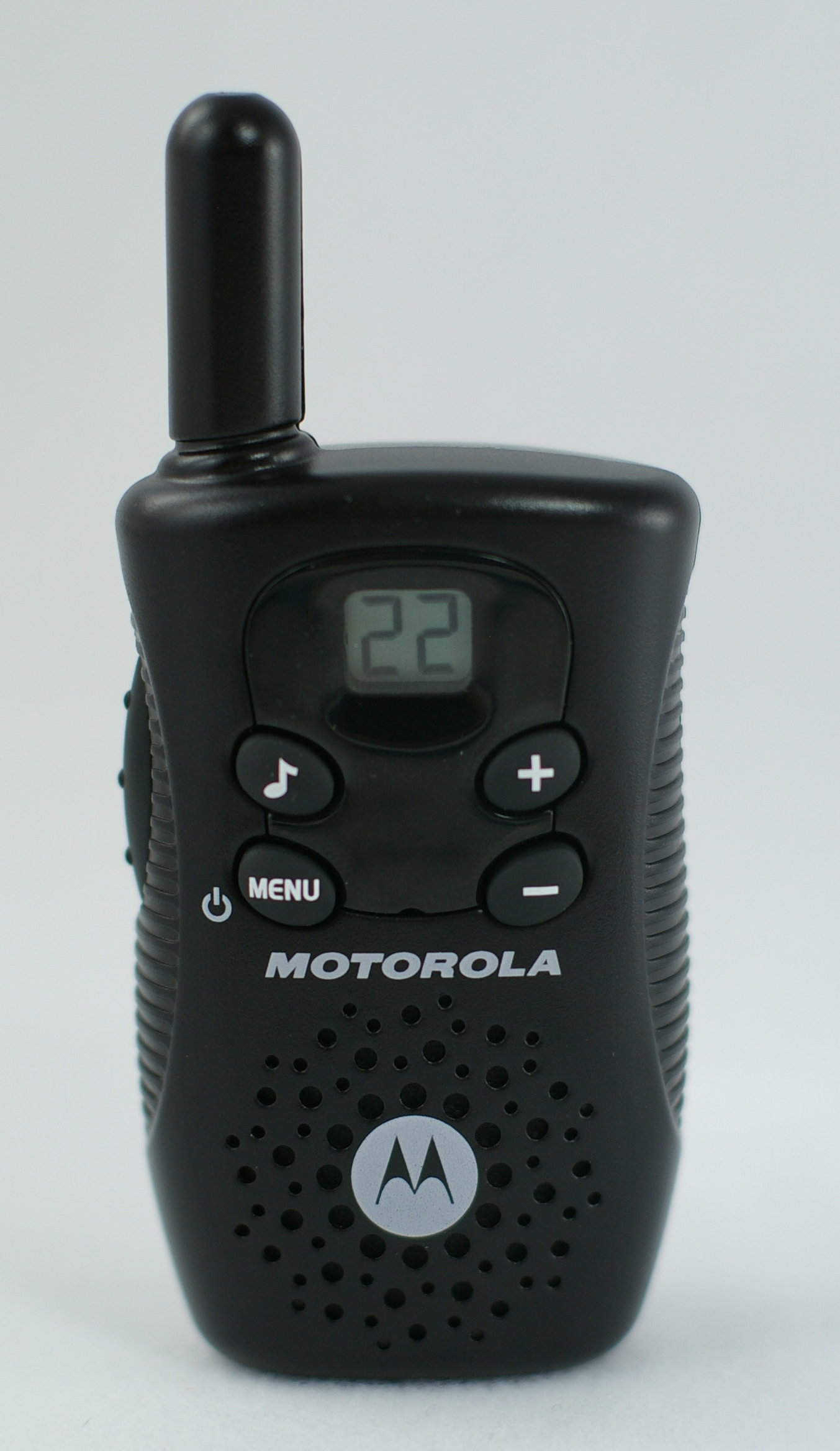
Motorola FV150 FRS and GMRS handheld radio

Hybrid FRS/GMRS consumer radios have been introduced that have 22 channels. Before May 2017, radios had been certified for unlicensed operation on the 7 FRS frequencies, channels 8–14, under FRS rules.

Prior to the 2017 revision, FCC rules required a GMRS license to operate on channels 1–7 using more than 0.5 watts. Many hybrid radios have an ERP that is lower than 0.5 watts on channels 1–7, or can be set by the user to operate at low power on these channels. This allows hybrid radios to be used under the license-free FRS rules if the ERP is less than 0.5 watts and the unit is certified for FRS operation on these frequencies. Beginning September 28, 2017, FRS operation is permitted at up to 2 watts on these channels.

Interference to licensed services may be investigated by the FCC.

Channels 8–14, formerly exclusive to FRS, since 28 September 2017 can be used by GMRS at 0.5 watts. Channels 15–22, formerly reserved exclusively for GMRS, can be used at up to 2 watts in the FRS.

Effective September 30, 2019, it became unlawful in the US to import, manufacture, sell or offer to sell radio equipment capable of operating under both GMRS and FRS. This does not include amateur and other radio equipment that are not certified under Part 95, such as many handheld radios that are marketed for amateur use but are also able to transmit on FRS and GMRS frequencies.

== List of FRS channels compared to GMRS ==
Channel	Frequency (MHz)	FRS EIRP Restriction	GMRS EIRP Restriction
1	462.5625	Up to 2 watts	Up to 5 watts
2	462.5875	Up to 2 watts	Up to 5 watts
3	462.6125	Up to 2 watts	Up to 5 watts
4	462.6375	Up to 2 watts	Up to 5 watts
5	462.6625	Up to 2 watts	Up to 5 watts
6	462.6875	Up to 2 watts	Up to 5 watts
7	462.7125	Up to 2 watts	Up to 5 watts
8	467.5625	Up to 0.5 watt	Up to 0.5 watt (Note: GMRS transmitting on channels 8-14 must follow FRS rules that are to be hand-held units with integral antennas, transmitting power on these channels will be limited to 0.5 Watts EIRP, emission bandwidth on these channels will be limited to 12.5 kilohertz, and frequency tolerance on these channels will be held to within 2.5 parts per million (ppm).)
9	467.5875	Up to 0.5 watt	Up to 0.5 watt
10	467.6125	Up to 0.5 watt	Up to 0.5 watt
11	467.6375	Up to 0.5 watt	Up to 0.5 watt
12	467.6625	Up to 0.5 watt	Up to 0.5 watt
13	467.6875	Up to 0.5 watt	Up to 0.5 watt
14	467.7125	Up to 0.5 watt	Up to 0.5 watt
15	462.5500	Up to 2 watts	Up to 50 watts
16	462.5750	Up to 2 watts	Up to 50 watts
17	462.6000	Up to 2 watts	Up to 50 watts
18	462.6250	Up to 2 watts	Up to 50 watts
19	462.6500	Up to 2 watts	Up to 50 watts
20	462.6750	Up to 2 watts	Up to 50 watts
21	462.7000	Up to 2 watts	Up to 50 watts
22	462.7250	Up to 2 watts	Up to 50 watts

- GMRS has other exclusive channels for repeater input
- No FRS unit shall exceed 0.5 watt ERP (Effective Radiated Power) on channels 8–14. FRS Channels 15-22 are shared with GMRS also under 2 watt ERP limit. However, if the device includes any of the following channels (467.5500, 467.5750, 467.6000, 467.6250, 467.6500, 467.6750, 467.7000, and 467.7250 MHz) a GMRS license is required. Benefits of a GMRS license include the ability to use repeaters, run higher power (up to 50 watts), and utilize external antennas, which result in much greater communication distances.

== Adoption ==
FRS grew very fast in its early years in the US. Sales of FRS walkie-talkies were 500,000 units in 1997, 1.75 million in 1998, 5 million in 1999, 7.5 million in 2000 and 9.5 million in 2001. The largest manufacturers of these devices were Motorola (with its Talkabout line), AudioVox and Cobra Electronics.

== FRS radios in other countries ==
Personal UHF radio services similar to the American FRS exist in other countries, although since technical standards and frequency bands will differ, usually FCC-approved FRS equipment may not be used in other jurisdictions.

=== Canada ===
American-standard FRS radios have been approved for use in Canada since April 2000. As of 2016, only low-power (2 W ERP), half duplex GMRS operation is permitted, but a license is not required. Repeater and high-power operations are not permitted. This allows the use of dual-mode FRS/GMRS walkie-talkies, but precludes the use of higher-powered GMRS devices designed for vehicle and base-station purposes.

=== Mexico ===
Since tourists often bring their FRS radios with them, and since trade between the U.S., Canada, and Mexico is of great value to all three countries, the Mexican Secretary of Communication and Transportation has authorized use of the FRS frequencies and equipment similar to that in the US. However, dual-mode FRS/GMRS equipment is not approved in Mexico, so caution should be exercised in operating hybrid FRS/GMRS devices purchased elsewhere.

=== South America ===
Dual-mode GMRS/FRS equipment is also approved in Brazil (GMRS only in simplex mode, GMRS frequencies 462.550, 467.550, 462.725, 467.725 are not allowed) and most other South American countries. Portable radios are heavily used in private communications, mainly by security staff in nightclubs and malls, but also in private parking, maintenance, and delivery services.

== See also ==
- ChatNow
- LPD433
- Multi-Use Radio Service
- PMR446
- Public Radio Service
