= Baofeng County =

Baofeng County 宝丰县
- County
- Location of the seat in Henan
- Coordinates: 33°52′06″N 113°03′17″E
- Country: People's Republic of China
- Province: Henan
- Prefecture-level city: Pingdingshan

Area
  - Total: 722 km^{2} (279 sq mi)

Population (2019)
  - Total: 500,400
  - Density: 693/km^{2} (1,800/sq mi)
- Time zone: UTC+8 (China Standard)
- Postal code: 467400

Baofeng County (simplified Chinese: 宝丰县; traditional Chinese: 寶豐縣; pinyin: Bǎofēng Xiàn) is a county under the administration of the prefecture-level city of Pingdingshan, in the west-central part of Henan, China. It is 722 square kilometres (279 sq mi) in area with a population of 480,000 in 2002.

It is 16 kilometers (10 miles) to Pingdingshan. Baofeng county is an important hub of communications in the central and western parts of Henan province. In 1120, the second year under the reign of Emperor Huizong in the Song Dynasty, the emperor named the county Baofeng, because it had rich resources and flourishing businesses, including a distilled spirit brewery, official porcelain production and iron smelting. In 1643, the 16th year of Emperor Chongzhen, it renamed Baoxian. Today Baofeng is a county under the jurisdiction of Pingdingshan.

Baofeng county has more than 20 varieties of rich mineral resources including steam coal, metal coal, bauxite, silica, clays, top lime and limestone.

== Administrative divisions ==
As of 2012, this county is divided to 1 subdistrict, 8 towns and 4 townships.

Subdistricts

- Tielu Subdistrict (铁路街道)

Towns

- Chengguan (城关镇)
- Zhouzhuang (周庄镇)
- Naodian (闹店镇)
- Shiqiao (石桥镇)
- Shangjiuwu (商酒务镇)
- Daying (大营镇)
- Zhangbaqiao (张八桥镇)
- Yangzhuang (杨庄镇)

Townships

- Xiaoqi Township (肖旗乡)
- Zhaozhuang Township (赵庄乡)
- Qianying Township (前营乡)
- Lizhuang Township (李庄乡)

== Climate ==
Climate data for Baofeng, elevation 136 m (446 ft), (1991–2020 normals, extremes 1981–2010)
| Month | Jan | Feb | Mar | Apr | May | Jun | Jul | Aug | Sep | Oct | Nov | Dec | Year |
|---|---|---|---|---|---|---|---|---|---|---|---|---|---|
| Record high °C (°F) | 20.0 (68.0) | 24.9 (76.8) | 29.0 (84.2) | 33.5 (92.3) | 41.0 (105.8) | 41.8 (107.2) | 40.7 (105.3) | 38.2 (100.8) | 39.5 (103.1) | 34.7 (94.5) | 28.4 (83.1) | 22.0 (71.6) | 41.8 (107.2) |
| Mean daily maximum °C (°F) | 6.8 (44.2) | 10.2 (50.4) | 15.6 (60.1) | 22.1 (71.8) | 27.7 (81.9) | 32.2 (90.0) | 32.1 (89.8) | 30.7 (87.3) | 27.0 (80.6) | 22.1 (71.8) | 14.9 (58.8) | 8.9 (48.0) | 20.9 (69.6) |
| Daily mean °C (°F) | 1.1 (34.0) | 4.1 (39.4) | 9.4 (48.9) | 15.8 (60.4) | 21.4 (70.5) | 26.2 (79.2) | 27.4 (81.3) | 25.8 (78.4) | 21.3 (70.3) | 15.9 (60.6) | 8.9 (48.0) | 3.1 (37.6) | 15.0 (59.1) |
| Mean daily minimum °C (°F) | −3.6 (25.5) | −1.1 (30.0) | 3.7 (38.7) | 9.5 (49.1) | 15.1 (59.2) | 20.5 (68.9) | 23.3 (73.9) | 22.0 (71.6) | 16.8 (62.2) | 10.9 (51.6) | 4.0 (39.2) | −1.6 (29.1) | 10.0 (49.9) |
| Record low °C (°F) | −14.5 (5.9) | −17.8 (0.0) | −8.8 (16.2) | −1.8 (28.8) | 2.0 (35.6) | 11.1 (52.0) | 15.6 (60.1) | 11.1 (52.0) | 6.9 (44.4) | −0.9 (30.4) | −8.2 (17.2) | −11.3 (11.7) | −17.8 (0.0) |
| Average precipitation mm (inches) | 13.4 (0.53) | 15.5 (0.61) | 29.2 (1.15) | 41.7 (1.64) | 68.7 (2.70) | 89.3 (3.52) | 162.3 (6.39) | 116.3 (4.58) | 88.6 (3.49) | 45.5 (1.79) | 32.4 (1.28) | 11.3 (0.44) | 714.2 (28.12) |
| Average precipitation days (≥ 0.1 mm) | 4.1 | 5.0 | 6.5 | 6.8 | 8.2 | 8.1 | 11.3 | 10.8 | 9.6 | 7.2 | 6.1 | 4.0 | 87.7 |
| Average snowy days | 4.3 | 3.3 | 1.2 | 0.1 | 0 | 0 | 0 | 0 | 0 | 0 | 1.0 | 2.6 | 12.5 |
| Average relative humidity (%) | 61 | 63 | 64 | 66 | 63 | 63 | 77 | 80 | 76 | 69 | 67 | 61 | 68 |
| Mean monthly sunshine hours | 101.7 | 113.7 | 155.4 | 182.0 | 192.4 | 178.1 | 161.8 | 154.2 | 138.8 | 138.0 | 124.5 | 114.8 | 1,755.4 |
| Percentage possible sunshine | 32 | 36 | 42 | 46 | 45 | 41 | 37 | 38 | 38 | 40 | 40 | 37 | 39 |
Source: China Meteorological Administration

== Transportation ==
The county is served by Pingdingshan West railway station and Baofeng railway station.
