= Baofeng railway station =

Railway station in Henan, China

Baofeng 宝丰

General information
- Location: Baofeng County, Pingdingshan, Henan; China
- Coordinates: 33.856314°N 113.040663°E
- Operated by: China Railway Zhengzhou Group
- Lines: Jiaozuo–Liuzhou railway Mengmiao–Baofeng railway

History
- Opened: June 19, 1970
Location

Baofeng railway station is a railway station in Baofeng County, Pingdingshan, Henan, China. It is an intermediate stop on the Jiaozuo–Liuzhou railway and the western terminus of the Mengmiao–Baofeng railway.

== History ==
The station opened on 19 June 1970. On 18 January 2008, the name of this station was changed from Baofeng to Pingdingshan West. On 15 July 2019, the name was reverted to Baofeng. The name Pingdingshan West was subsequently taken by a station on the Zhengzhou–Wanzhou high-speed railway which opened on 1 December.

Preceding station	China Railway	Following station
Ruzhou towards Jiaozuo	Jiaozuo–Liuzhou railway	Lushan towards Liuzhou
Pingdingshan towards Luohe	Mengmiao–Baofeng railway	Terminus
