= Pirate radio in Asia =

Unlicensed radio stations in Asia

Pirate radio stations have operated in various countries of Asia, often putting over political or nationalist points of view. Offshore stations have attempted to reach China or overseas Chinese residents. Citizens' Radio is an unlicensed Hong Kong pro-democracy station. In Taiwan, what are known as "underground radio" stations have broadcast both pro- and anti-government opinions. Large numbers of unlicensed stations have functioned in the Philippines, of which 107.9 U-Radio (2006–2013) is among the best known. Finally, Radio First Termer was briefly operated by and for U.S. troops in Vietnam in 1971.

== China ==
In mainland China, setting up a private radio or TV station will not be permitted, broadcasting stations can only be set by local government. However, everyone can easily purchase a portable FM transmitter for special application. So that someone is going to sell drugs via private FM transmission called Black Radio, which means illegal radio broadcasting in China. Some illegal stations make a lot of jamming to public stations and airplanes' communications.

A number of offshore radio stations have reportedly operated from the South China Sea, mainly for political purposes and these include Voice of the People's Liberation Army; Radio Flash; The October Storm; Rediffusion Central; Popular of Peking. In 1990–1991, two other offshore radio stations intended for a Chinese audience made news in the world's press.

One of them was Radio Tiananmen, a station that was to be based aboard the MV Sarah (Lichfield I) to be renamed Liberty that had been the former home of Radio Newyork International that broadcast briefly during two consecutive years in late 1980s from an anchorage off Jones Beach, New York. The idea was to anchor the ship in international waters off the Northeast coastline of the US and to broadcast on behalf of the thousands of Chinese students studying in the US in support of their fellow students who had demonstrated in Tiananmen Square. The idea faltered when the backers were told that the United States government would oppose an independent political station of this type.

The other station was created in France and sponsored by Actuel, a French magazine and The Face, a British magazine together with support from contributors in Hong Kong. The group called themselves "Federation for Democracy in China" and they bought a ship, which they renamed, Goddess of Democracy, which was also the name of the proposed station. When the vessel sailed from La Rochelle, France it was intended for the ship to dock and that is where studios, transmitters and radio antenna would be installed. However, the project was abandoned after political and financial problems.

== Hong Kong ==
In 2006, Citizens' Radio was founded by a group of pro-democracy activists, including Tsang Kin-shing and legislator Leung Kwok-hung, also known as "Long Hair". It broadcast on weeknights from Chai Wan on 102.8 MHz FM.

On 30 November 2009, FM101, a station based in Kwun Tong commenced broadcasting, according to the South China Morning Post (1 December 2009). It was heard in the east of Kowloon and the east of Hong Kong Island. The station's founders include Leung King-wai, Tsang Chun-Ying and Kwok Yiu-Cheong. The latter two were formerly presenters for Citizens' Radio, but Citizens' Radio was not involved in its foundation, according to founder Tsang Kin-Shing.

== India ==
Amateur radio or ham radio is practised by more than 22,000 licensed users in India. The first amateur radio operator was licensed in 1921, and by the mid-1930s, there were around 20 amateur radio operators in India. Amateur radio operators played an important part in the Indian independence movement with the establishment of illegal pro-independence radio stations in the 1940s. The three decades after India's independence saw only slow growth in the number of operators until the then Prime Minister of India and amateur radio operator, Rajiv Gandhi (VU2RG), waived the import duty on wireless equipment in 1984. Since then, numbers have picked up, and as of 2007, there were more than 16,000 operators in the country. Amateur radio operators have played a vital role during disasters and national emergencies such as earthquakes, tsunamis, cyclones, floods, and bomb blasts, by providing voluntary emergency communications in the affected areas.

With the outbreak of World War II in 1939, the British cancelled the issue of new licences. All amateur radio operators were sent written orders to surrender their transmitting equipment to the police, both for possible use in the war effort and to prevent the clandestine use of the stations by Axis collaborators and spies. With the gaining momentum of the Indian independence movement, ham operator Nariman Abarbad Printer (VU2FU) set up the Azad Hind Radio to broadcast Gandhian protest music and uncensored news; he was immediately arrested and his equipment seized. In August 1942, after Mahatma Gandhi launched the Quit India Movement, the British began clamping down on the activities of Indian independence activists and censoring the media. To circumvent media restrictions, Indian National Congress activists, led by Usha Mehta, contacted Mumbai-based amateur radio operators, "Bob" Tanna (VU2LK) and Nariman Printer to help broadcast messages to grass-roots party workers across the country. The radio service was called the "Congress Radio", and began broadcasting from 2 September 1942 on 7.12 MHz. The station could be received as far as Japanese-occupied Myanmar. By November 1942, Tanna was betrayed by an unknown radio officer and was forced to shut down the station.

== Taiwan ==
In reference to unlicensed land-based stations, the term underground radio is in common usage in Taiwan. The World United Formosans for Independence reportedly studied the possibility of broadcasting from the Philippines, but no concrete action materialised.

The underground radio movement began in the liberalising political milieu following the lifting of the decades-long martial law. Historically, most of the stations have opposed, in some manner, the political establishment represented by the Chinese Nationalist Party (Kuomintang) and the Republic of China (ROC) framework, in favour of the then opposition movement broadly consisting of the Democratic Progressive Party (DPP) and allied social movements. These so-called pan-green radio stations are mostly based in central and southern Taiwan with most listeners being hard-core pan-green supporters who despise Kuomintang rule and the potential for Chinese unification. A few stations positioned themselves on the opposing end of the political spectrum, generally favouring the ROC status quo advocated by the New Party and "non-mainstream factions" within the Nationalist Party. With the DPP formerly in power, and ultimate Taiwan independence and sovereignty is the stance taken by most underground radio stations, Taiwan was one of the rare examples in the world of underground radio stations being pro-government.

Programming generally is of a vertical blocking format, with live call-ins taking up a good portion of air time. On some stations, slots are allocated to local community and activist groups. The most prominent segment of the audience comes from rural working class, males usually middle-aged and beyond. Taiwanese Hokkien is by far the most commonly used language on the air, although Mandarin and, much less frequently, Hakka are also used. Underground radio stations cover their expenses by selling unorthodox drugs or medicine in a humorous and entertaining manner to keep the listeners hooked between actual programming.

Most if not all underground stations favour a mechanism to gain legal status but many balk at the costly requirements, which they believe to favour corporate and Nationalist-owned broadcasters. Government policy has always treated underground radio as an illegal enterprise, even after the DPP came to power. Official responses have been more varied, alternating between levying fines and confiscating equipment to tolerating their presence. Most stations are able to set up backup broadcast points within days of government raids. Commercial stations are known to file official complaints against pirate stations, whose signals are said to interfere with legal broadcasts.

== Philippines ==
Licensed radio operations in the country are supervised by the National Telecommunications Commission and the same agency (along with the Kapisanan ng mga Brodkaster ng Pilipinas) has been involved in raids cracking down unlicensed stations. Despite the proliferation of pirate radio in various times and the agency's proper counteractions, the most documented notorious hub of unlicensed operators have been predominantly within Metro Manila; while others are from Pampanga, Cebu and in some parts of Mindanao.

=== Earlier cases ===
In 1931, the 9th Philippine Legislature enacted Act No. 3846, which would regulate radio stations and radio communications in the Philippines. The law became effective in February 1932. According to Section 2, a permit, granted by the Secretary of Commerce and Communications, is needed for the installation of a station.

In 1966, the Radio Control Board started the investigation on the presence of some clandestine and unlicensed radio stations in several parts of the country, following their discovery. Such operations meant violation of the aforementioned provision. Disturbed by the report, president Ferdinand Marcos ordered the Secretary of Public Works and Communications to expedite its inquiry into the case and to prosecute guilty parties. In 1967, Marcos formed a committee to update pre-World War II radio laws, and later ordered a crackdown on illegal stations. Reports indicated that some 18 radio transceivers, 11 of them apparently unlicensed, were found operating in eastern coast of Luzon, were owned by naturalized Filipinos of Asian origin, and had a power output ranging at 300–500 watts.

In 1987, the National Tax Research Center found out that among the commercial broadcast stations (including radio), 70% of them were not subject to franchise taxes. These were initially operated through permits from Broadcast Media Council (BMC), issued during martial law era, and did not have any franchises granted by the legislature. Upon abolition of BMC in 1981, Marcos ordered the National Telecommunications Commission (NTC) to allow these stations without franchise to operate up to June 30, 1983, under a provisional authority. However, operations continued thereafter; hence such were considered illegal.

=== Radyo Bandido ===
Radyo Bandido, a clandestine radio station led by Radyo Veritas 846 kHz personnel, Jesuit priest James Reuter and disk jockey June Keithley, played a vital role in the 1986 EDSA Revolution that resulted to the ouster of president Marcos.

Seventeen people, led by Keithley, gathered secretly to open a station atop the shuttered Jacinto-Tanco building—then housing the facility of DZRJ-AM 810 kHz—in Santa Mesa, Manila, shortly after the government forcibly shuttered all opposition broadcast stations including the Catholic-run Veritas, at that time one of the few covering the revolution, on the early morning of February 23. The station, staffed by the team from Veritas with the guidance of then-Defense Minister Juan Ponce Enrile, was operational from the 23rd until the fall of the Marcos administration on the 25th. The president once attempted to prevent their operation, ordering one of his crack teams led by Bobby Ortega to find the station, but failed.

At present, the station continues to legally operate as DZRJ-AM, adapting the name Radyo Bandido.

=== Radyo Sierra Madre ===
On December 26, 1987, an unprecedented, clandestine radio broadcast was made by the Communist Party of the Philippines to mark its 19th anniversary. Named "Radyo Sierra Madre, ang Tinig ng Malayang Pilipinas" ("Radio Sierra Madre, [the] Voice of the Free Philippines"), what was believed to be their first attempt to use a commercial radio band for propaganda purposes during the communist insurgency was later reported becoming the first successful broadcast to the public.

Their message, intended to be aired at 3 p.m., was postponed until 9 p.m. The 35-minute broadcast had a pause after 30 minutes, which suggested the use of a cassette tape. In an apparent pre-taped message, rebels criticized human rights abuses of the administration of president Corazon Aquino; accused the United States of interference; and praised Fidel Castro, leader of Cuba which they likewise greeted on the upcoming anniversary of the 1958 communist revolution. The broadcast began and ended with protest songs, revolutionary music, and socialist anthem The Internationale.

"Radyo Sierra Madre" had at least two more broadcasts in 1988. The second one—at 9 p.m. of January 30—lasted for about 30 minutes and included an interview in relation to the strength of the New People's Army. Another—on February 8, from 6–10 p.m., and marked by quarter-hour hourly breaks—was where the National Democratic Front of the Philippines sought for a "coalition government."

The broadcasts were monitored at 106–106.5 MHz, apparently unused FM radio frequencies; and were characterized having a weak signal, thus listening and understanding to these, particularly to the second one, became difficult. The Armed Forces of the Philippines (AFP) later learned that the first two, initially believed to be originated from Metro Manila, were transmitted from a mobile communications equipment. Meanwhile, the third one was reportedly transmitted from a ship located in Dipolog, Zamboanga del Norte; as the military likewise believed that the other two came from the same vehicle sailing somewhere between Dipolog and Bohol.

On February 23, in a hearing by the Philippine Senate Committee on Public Information and Mass Media, the AFP disclosed "taking action" on these broadcasts that reportedly incited the people to rebellion, though it refused to mention what it was referring to.

Another case of radio broadcasting involving the communists was "Radyo Gil-ayab" ("gil-ayab" is an Ilocano term for "blaze"), existed by 2003–2004 in the Cagayan Valley. It is uncertain if it was a licensed broadcast.

=== FM 90.3 MHz, Marikina ===
Station DWPM-FM or DWBM-FM (90.3 MHz) was established by the government of Marikina in October 1992, and broadcast from the municipal hall. However, a group composed of lone district representative Romeo Candazo, five opposition councilors, and a private individual, urged the NTC to investigate the station's alleged illegal operation as it had no congressional franchise and violated NTC rules on test broadcasts.

Under NTC rules, the permits on such allowed to play only classical music; but the broadcast was used to make political statements critical of the opponents of mayor Bayani Fernando, particularly a forum aired on May 3, 1993. Later that month, the Philippine House Committee on Transportation and Communications filed a complaint before the NTC against municipal officials.

Candazo alleged that on May 20, the NTC extended the temporary permit for the municipality, making it retroactive a day following its expiration on April 7. The permit was eventually revoked in late June.

=== DYPC-FM, Metro Cebu ===
A radio station identified as DYPC-FM 91.9 was operated by a Mandaue City College (MCC) campus under Paulus Cañete (the last two letters of the callsign stood for his initial) from Basak, Mandaue, despite lacking authority from the NTC and its operation overlapping with that of DYHR-FM 91.5 MHz of Cebu Broadcasting Company in Cebu City. It became a subject of a raid by the NTC in Central Visayas (NTC-7) on August 26, 2015. The station was then closed upon NTC's instructions, but reportedly resumed its broadcast operation for 460 days (August 28, 2015 – November 29, 2016).

Cañete had been involved in multiple legal disputes since being an MCC administrator until 2007; and later operated his own, separate school named MCC-Cañete. On the other hand, the college's application for the station's license began as early as 2006, but the process was stalled and only continued at that time of the raid; while the college had to acquire a congressional franchise.

NTC-7 filed a case against Cañete at the central office in Manila, which ruled on January 26, 2017, that the MCC violated the law for the station's illegal operations. In October 2020, the Court of Appeals (CA) 19th Division denied the petition of the MCC-Cañete, affirming the ₱46,000 fine imposed on them. The CA dismissed Cañete's argument that the station was designed for the training of students, exempting MCC from the requirement of obtaining a legislative franchise under Act No. 3846; saying that a provision of Executive Order No. 546 gave the NTC the function of issuing permits even to amateur radio stations. However, the court said that the business name registration for Mandaue Broadcasting Center did not prove Cañete's ownership of the station as the NTC identified the station's operator otherwise as DYCP 91.9 MHz.

Meanwhile, MCC-Cañete, where the station was situated, was ordered closed by the Commission on Higher Education in 2010; the order was eventually upheld by the Supreme Court in 2023, ending the dispute with the "legitimate" MCC.

=== Negros Oriental stations ===
In January 2016, the Kapisanan ng mga Brodkaster ng Pilipinas–Negros Oriental chapter filed a complaint with the provincial office of the NTC against at least 14 alleged illegally-operating FM radio stations in the province. Based on their monitoring, these stations aired commercials and blocktime programs without paying taxes to the government, and lacked locally-issued permits; while some were reportedly owned by politicians seeking media mileage during the election period. By June 2022, six of them have been formally licensed by the NTC:

- Bais: DYDB 88.9 Beat FM; DYEL 104.7 Like Radio
- Dumaguete: DYFL 90.5 Like Radio
- Bayawan: DYLN 107.5 Magic FM
- Siaton: DYSW 94.5, formerly Radyo ni Juan
- Guihulngan: DYJL 94.5 Like Radio

Other stations included:

- Tanjay: 98.3 FM; 103.8 FM; 101.9 FM; and 102.5 Connect FM.
- Tayasan: 98.1 Muews Radio
- Valencia: 102.3 DYPW
- Jimalalud: 90.5 Mabuhay Radio

Meanwhile, by late 2021, the NTC-7 identified 16 illegal FM radio station operators in the province; the commission called for their compliance with the government requirements, summoning all of them for mediation proceedings.

=== Mindanao area ===
In the first half of 2018, the NTC–11 monitored the operations of at least 35 illegal radio stations in Davao Region, with five of them allegedly set up prior to the 2018 Barangay and Sangguniang Kabataan elections (BSKE). As a cease and desist order was recommended for almost all stations, it was only given to six of them, all located in Davao and Digos cities, and Bansalan and Lupon towns. It was reported that stations were hijacking frequencies from the legal ones, for instance, a few illegal operators from Mati, Davao Oriental utilized FM allocations reserved for Davao City; a station in the province was reportedly owned by a member of the House; and that stations usually utilized an allegedly homemade portable transmitter. The commission admitted that most of these stations were instrumental in the presidential campaign of Rodrigo Duterte in 2016. The number of such stations reportedly increased, mostly being installed by politicians for their campaign and operating in houses or establishments, particularly prior to the local elections of 2019 and of 2022 when it reached 50, with some voluntarily shutting down after the elections, but as the commission admitted, these were expected to be operational in time for the (later-postponed) Barangay and Sangguniang Kabataan elections (BSKE). In 2024, NTC–11, stating the same concern, reported that while investigations were ongoing, several unauthorized stations had ceased operations following orders on cease-and-desist orders and show-cause. It cited availability of broadcast equipment online that allowed such operations.

On the other hand, in October 2024, the NTC–10 launched an operation against unlicensed radio stations in Northern Mindanao that broadcast fake news and questionable political commentaries, as well as legitimate stations with expired franchises. In a surprise inspection, at least 17 stations, found to be unlicensed or lacking permits despite having a legislative franchise, were closed as they were given cease and desist and show cause orders from the NTC central office. The commission's investigation showed that these unlicensed stations, in order to reach target audiences particularly in the hinterland barangays, are using equipment which had been bought through online selling platforms; and some secretly setting up their transmitters on trees and elevated areas. They also noticed that the subject stations, along with others, are operational during the height of election campaigns.

== Vietnam ==
Radio First Termer was a pirate radio station which operated in January 1971 in Saigon during the Vietnam War.

The station was hosted by a United States Air Force sergeant (born August 15, 1948) calling himself "Dave Rabbit". The two other members of the crew were known as "Pete Sadler" and "Nguyen". Their real names were Don Wade and Roma, a WLS team.

After three tours in Vietnam, "Dave Rabbit" and his friends launched Radio First Termer from a secret studio in a Saigon brothel. The station broadcast for 63 hours over 21 nights (between 1 January 1971 and 21 January 1971).

The station played "hard acid rock" such as Steppenwolf, Bloodrock, Three Dog Night, Led Zeppelin, Sugarloaf, the James Gang, and Iron Butterfly, bands which were popular among the troops but largely ignored by the American Forces Vietnam Network. The music was mixed with antiwar commentary, skits poking fun at the U.S. Air Force and Lyndon B. Johnson, and raunchy sex and drug oriented jokes.

During the mid-1990s, sound clips from a Radio First Termer broadcast posted on the internet renewed interest in the station. In February 2006, "Dave Rabbit" came forward and told his story. He also did an interview for a bonus feature on the DVD release of Sir! No Sir!, a film about G.I. counterculture during the Vietnam era.

Although the frequency was always announced as FM69, in reality, the show was broadcast over numerous frequencies, in addition to 69 MHz as selected by the Radio Relay troops across Vietnam. It was also broadcast over AM frequencies, including 690 AM.

In February 2008 audio clips of this underground radio show made their way into the hands Opie & Anthony and 3rd mic Jim Norton. They played some of the audio of these shows over the air at both their terrestrial radio show and their XM Satellite radio show and were impressed with the skills of Dave Rabbit back in "the 'Nam" which led to renewed interest on such sites as Google.
