= Amateur radio in India =

Amateur radio or ham radio is practised by more than 22,000 licensed users in India. The first amateur radio operator was licensed in 1921, and by the mid-1930s, there were around 20 amateur radio operators in India. Amateur radio operators played an important part in the Indian independence movement with the establishment of illegal pro-independence radio stations in the 1940s. The three decades after India's independence saw only slow growth in the number of operators until the then Prime Minister of India and amateur radio operator, Rajiv Gandhi (VU2RG), waived the import duty on wireless equipment in 1984. Since then, numbers have picked up, and as of 2007, there were more than 16,000 operators in the country. Amateur radio operators have played a vital role during disasters and national emergencies such as earthquakes, tsunamis, cyclones, floods, and bomb blasts, by providing voluntary emergency communications in the affected areas.

The Wireless and Planning and Coordination Wing (WPC)—a division of the Ministry of Communications and Information Technology—regulates amateur radio in India. The WPC assigns call signs, issues amateur radio licences, conducts exams, allots frequency spectrum, and monitors the radio waves. Popular amateur radio events include daily ham nets, the annual Hamfest India, and regular DX contests.

== History ==
The first amateur radio operator in India was Amarendra Chandra Gooptu (callsign 2JK), licensed in 1921. Later that year, Mukul Bose (2HQ) became the second ham operator, thereby introducing the first two-way ham radio communication in the country. By 1923, there were twenty British hams operating in India. In 1929, the call sign prefix VU came into effect in India, replacing three-letter call signs. The first short-wave entertainment and public broadcasting station, "VU6AH", was set up in 1935 by E P Metcalfe, vice-chancellor of Mysore University. However, there were fewer than fifty license holders in the mid-1930s, most of them British officers in the Indian army.

With the outbreak of World War II in 1939, the British cancelled the issue of new licences. All amateur radio operators were sent written orders to surrender their transmitting equipment to the police, both for possible use in the war effort and to prevent the clandestine use of the stations by Axis collaborators and spies. With the gaining momentum of the Indian independence movement, ham operator Nariman Abarbad Printer (VU2FU) set up the Azad Hind Radio to broadcast Gandhian protest music and uncensored news; he was immediately arrested and his equipment seized. In August 1942, after Mahatma Gandhi launched the Quit India Movement, the British began clamping down on the activities of Indian independence activists and censoring the media. To circumvent media restrictions, Indian National Congress activists, led by Usha Mehta, contacted Mumbai-based amateur radio operators, "Bob" Tanna (VU2LK) and Nariman Printer to help broadcast messages to grass-roots party workers across the country. The radio service was called the "Congress Radio", and began broadcasting from 2 September 1942 on 7.12 MHz. The station could be received as far as Japanese-occupied Myanmar. By November 1942, Tanna was betrayed by an unknown radio officer and was forced to shut down the station.

Temporary amateur radio licences were issued from 1946, after the end of World War II. By 1948, there were 50 amateur radio operators in India, although only a dozen were active. Following India's independence in 1947, the first amateur radio organization, the Amateur Radio Club of India was inaugurated on 15 May 1948 at the School of Signals at Mhow in Madhya Pradesh. The club headquarters was later moved to New Delhi, where it was renamed the Amateur Radio Society of India (ARSI) on 15 May 1954. As India's oldest amateur radio organization, ARSI became its representative at the International Amateur Radio Union.

Partly due to low awareness among the general population and prohibitive equipment costs, the number of licensed amateur radio operators did not increase significantly over the next two decades, numbering fewer than a thousand by 1970. CW (Morse code) and amplitude modulation (AM) were the predominant modes at that time. The electronic equipment was mostly valve-based, obtained from Indian army surpluses. During the mid-1960s, the modes of operation saw a change from AM to single sideband (SSB) as the preferred communication mode. By 1980, the number of amateur radio operators had risen to 1,500. In 1984, then Indian Prime Minister, Rajiv Gandhi, waived the import duty for wireless equipment. After this, the number of operators rose steadily, and by 2000 there were 10,000 licensed ham operators. As of 2007, there are more than 17,000 licensed users in India.

Amateur radio operators have played a significant part in disaster management and emergencies. In 1991, during the Gulf War, a lone Indian ham operator in Kuwait, provided the only means of communication between stranded Indian nationals in that country and their relatives in India. Amateur radio operators have also played a helpful part in disaster management. Shortly after the 1993 Latur and 2001 Gujarat earthquakes, the central government rushed teams of ham radio operators to the epicentre to provide vital communication links. In December 2004, a group of amateur radio operators on DX-pedition on the Andaman Islands witnessed the 2004 Indian Ocean Tsunami. With communication lines between the islands severed, the group provided the only way of relaying live updates and messages to stations across the world.

In 2005, India became one of the few countries to launch an amateur radio satellite, the HAMSAT. The Indian Space Research Organisation (ISRO) launched the microsatellite as an auxiliary payload on the PSLV-6.

== Licence ==
The Indian Wireless Telegraph (Amateur Service) Amendment Rules, 2009 lists two license categories:

1. Amateur Station Operators' Licence (General)
2. Amateur Station Operators' Licence (Restricted)

After passing the examination, the candidate can proceed to apply for an amateur radio licence certificate. After clearance, the WPC grants the licence along with the user-chosen call sign. This procedure can take up to 12 months.

Licence category	Age	Power	Examination	Privileges
Amateur Station Operators' Licence (Restricted) (Formerly Grade II)	12	10 W on VHF and UHF 50 W on HF	Minimum score of 40% in each section of the written examination, and 50% overall.	Terrestrial radiotelephony transmission in VHF and UHF frequency bands and 12 HF Bands.
Amateur Station Operators' Licence (General) (Formerly Grade I and Advanced)	12	25 W on VHF and UHF 400 W on HF	Minimum score of 50% in each section of the written examination, and 55% overall. In addition, a demonstration of proficiency in sending and receiving Morse code at eight words a minute.	Radiotelegraphy and radiotelephony transmission VHF and UHF frequency bands and 12 HF Bands.

=== Examination ===
Examination centres

Amateur Station Operator's Certificate or ASOC is the examination that needs to be passed to receive an amateur radio licence in India. The exam is conducted by the Wireless and Planning and Coordination Wing (WPC), which comes under the Department of Telecommunications of the Ministry of Communications. The examination is held monthly in Delhi, Mumbai, Kolkata and Chennai, every two months in Ahmedabad, Nagpur and Hyderabad, and every four months in some smaller cities. The licence may be awarded to an individual or a club station operated by a group of licensed amateur radio operators.

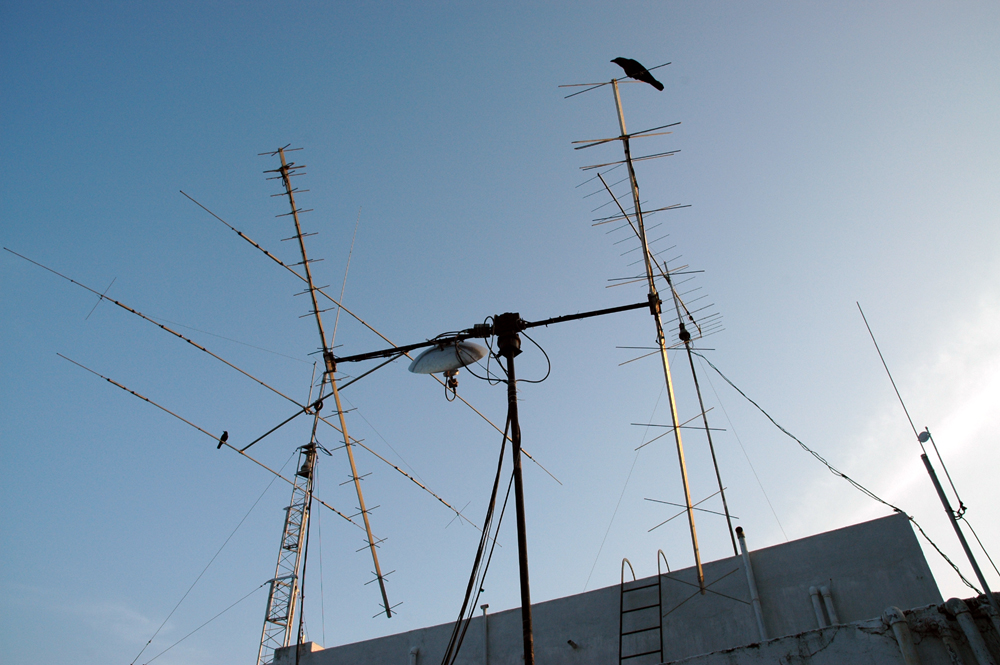
Antennas at the location of ham operator VU2GMN in Chennai. Knowledge of propagation and antennas is needed to get the licence.

The exam consists of two parts:

1. Part I – Written Test
  1. Section 1: Radio Theory and Practice
  2. Section 2: Radio Regulations
2. Part II – Morse Test (Not required for Restricted Grade)
  1. Section 1: Morse Receiving and Sending (Speed: 8 words per minute)
  2. Section 2: Morse Receiving and Sending (Speed: 8 words per minute)

The written test for the Restricted Grade consists of 50 questions related to radio theory and practice and radio regulations (25 questions in each section), that one must attempt in one hour. The written test for the General Grade consists of 100 questions, with 50 questions in each section, that have to be attempted in two hours. A candidate must score a minimum of 40% (50% for General grade) in each written section, and 50% (60% for the General grade) in aggregate for passing the test.

The application and licensing procedures are done online through the SaralSanchar portal, short for Simplified Application For Registration And Licenses, which is a web portal for license management under the Department of Telecommunications.

==== Radio theory and practice ====
The Radio theory and practice syllabus includes eight subtopics:

The first subtopic is the elementary theory of electricity that covers topics on conductors, resistors, Ohm's law, power, energy, electromagnets, inductance, capacitance, types of capacitors and inductors, series and parallel connections for radio circuits. The second topic is the elementary theory of alternating currents. Portions include sinusoidal alternating quantities such as peak values, instantaneous values, RMS average values, phase; electrical resonance, and quality factor for radio circuits. The syllabus then moves on to semiconductors, specifically the construction and operation of valves, also known as vacuum tubes. Included in this portion of the syllabus are thermionic emissions with their characteristic curves, diodes, triodes and multi-electrode valves; and the use of valves as rectifiers, oscillators, amplifiers, detectors and frequency changers, stabilisation and smoothing.

Radio receivers is the fourth topic that covers the principles and operation of TRF receivers and Superheterodyne receivers, CW reception; with receiver characteristics such as sensitivity, selectivity and fidelity; Adjacent-channel interference and image interference; AGC and squelch; and signal-to-noise ratio (S/R). Similarly, the next topic on transmitters covers the principles and operation of low power transmitters; oscillators such as the Colpitts oscillator, Hartley oscillator, crystal oscillators, and stability of oscillators.

The last three topics deal with radio propagation, aerials, and frequency measurement. Covered are topic such as wavelength, frequency, nature and propagation of radio waves; ground and sky waves; skip distance; and fading. Common types of transmitting and receiving aerials such as Yagi antennas, and radiation patterns, measurement of frequency and use of simple frequency meters conclude the topic.

==== Radio Regulations ====
Knowledge of the Indian Wireless Telegraph Rules and the Indian Wireless Telegraphs (Amateur Service) Rules are essential and always tested. The syllabus also includes international radio regulations related to the operation of amateur stations with emphasis on provisions of radio regulation nomenclature of the frequency and wavelength, frequency allocation to amateur radio service, measures to prevent harmful interference, standard frequency and time signals services across the world, identification of stations, distress and urgency transmissions, amateur stations, phonetic alphabets, and figure code are the other topics included in the portion.

Also included in the syllabus are Q codes such as QRA, QRG, QRH, QRI, QRK, QRL, QRM, QRN, QRQ, QRS, QRT, QRU, QRV, QRW, QRX, QRZ, QSA, QSB, QSL, QSO, QSU, QSV, QSW, QSX, QSY, QSZ, QTC, QTH, QTR, and QUM; and abbreviations such as AA, AB, AR, AS, C, CFM, CL, CQ, DE, K, NIL, OK, R, TU, VA, WA, and WB.

==== Morse Code Test ====
Chart of the Morse code letters and numerals

Candidates who appear for the General grade licence examination must also take and pass the Morse receiving and sending test simultaneously. There is no Morse test for the Restricted grade. The test piece consists of a plain language passage of 200 letters which may consist of letters, figures and punctuation marks such as the full stop, comma, semicolon, break sign, hyphen and question mark.

Receiving
Candidates have to receive for five consecutive minutes at a speed of 8 words per minute, the test piece from an audio oscillator keyed either manually or automatically. Accurately receiving a part of the test piece for one consecutive minute is required to pass the receiving test. A short practice piece is sent at the prescribed speed before the start of the test. Making more than five errors disqualifies a candidate. The average words consist of five characters and each figure and punctuation is counted as two characters.

Sending
The test piece is similar to the one provided in the receiving section. Candidates are required to transmit by using a straight Morse key for five consecutive minutes at the minimum speed of 8 words per minute. A short practice piece is allowed before the test. Candidates are not allowed more than one attempt in the test. Making more than five errors disqualifies a candidate.

Scheduling of the examination
Place	Month
Delhi, Mumbai, Kolkata, Chennai	Every month
Ahmedabad, Hyderabad and Nagpur	January, March, June, August, October and December
Ahmedabad, Nagpur, Hyderabad, Ajmer, Bangalore, Darjeeling, Gorakhpur, Jalandhar, Goa (Betim), Mangalore, Shillong, Ranchi (Dumka), Srinagar, Dibrugarh, Visakhapatnam, and Thiruvananthapuram.	January, April, July and October

=== Fees ===
License fees for different grades in Indian Rupees
Grade	20 Years	Lifetime
General Grade	1000	2000
Restricted Grade	1000	2000

=== Reciprocal licensing and operational restrictions ===
Indian amateur radio exams can only be taken by Indian citizens. Foreign passport holders can apply for reciprocal Indian licences based upon a valid amateur radio license from their country of residence.

Indian amateur radio licences always bear mention of location of transmitting equipment. Portable and mobile amateur radio stations earlier required explicit permission from WPC and the fee for mobile endorsement was fixed at ₹200. As of June 2019, amateur radio stations are allowed to operate anywhere in India except those locations that are restricted by the government from time to time.

Amateur radio operators from United States of America do not have automatic reciprocity in India. The use of US Federal Communications Commission (FCC) call-signs is prohibited under Indian law.

== Call-signs ==
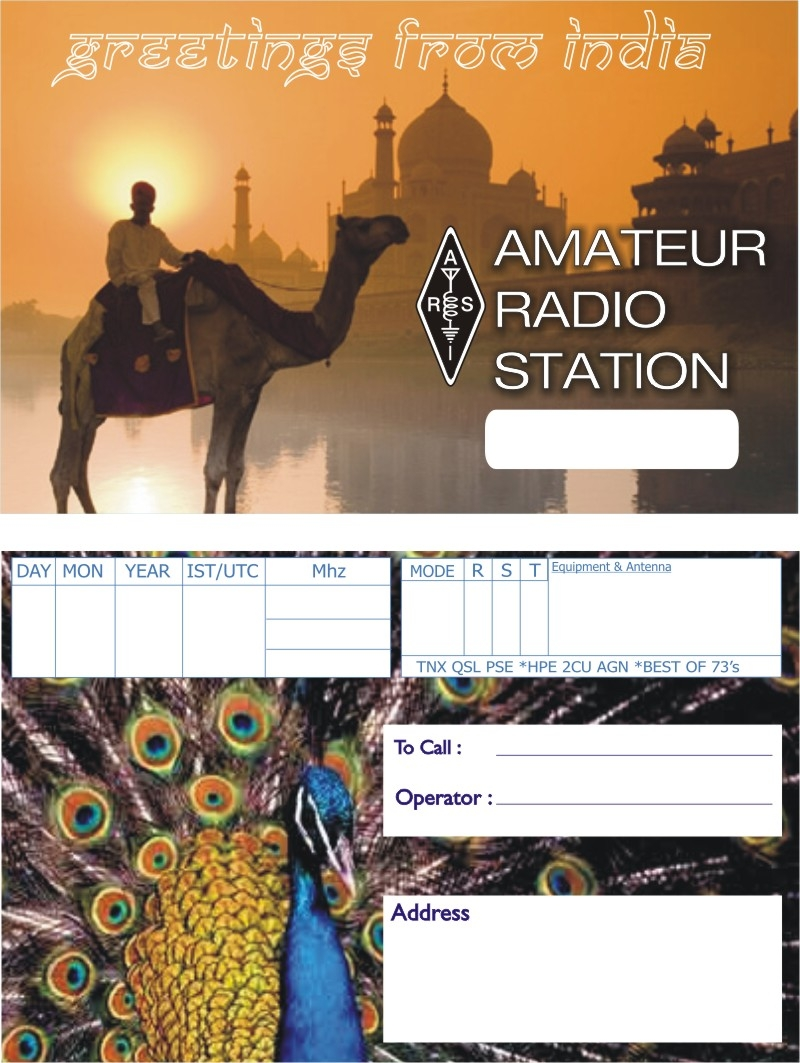
The generic QSL card created by ARSI for amateur radio operators in India

The International Telecommunication Union (ITU) has divided the World into three regions; India is located in ITU Region 3. These regions are further divided into two competing zones, the ITU and the CQ. Mainland India and the Lakshadweep Islands come under ITU Zone 41 and CQ Zone 22, and the Andaman and Nicobar Islands under ITU Zone 49 and CQ Zone 26. The ITU has assigned to India call-sign blocks 8TA to 8YZ, VUA to VWZ, and ATA to AWZ. Call sign could be the first one or two letters of the series, such as: Series 1 - A, AW, AV, AU, AT etc; Series 2 - V, VW, VV, VU, VT; Series 3 - 8, 8T, 8U, 8V, 8W, 8X, 8Y etc,.

The WPC allots individual call-signs. Indian amateur radio operators are allotted only the VU call-sign prefix. The V or Viceroy, series prefix was allotted to British colonies. at the 1912 London International Radiotelegraphic Convention.

VU call-signs are listed according to licence grade: for General (formerly the Advanced Grade and Grade–I) licence holders, the call-sign prefix is VU2; for Restricted (formerly Grade–II and Grade–II Restricted) licence holders, the prefix is VU3. The VU3 prefix has also been granted to foreigners operating in India. As of 2011, call-signs consist of only letters, not numerals, and the suffix is three characters long. Examples of Indian amateur radio call-signs are "VU2XYZ" and "VU3EGH".

In addition to individual and club call-signs, the WPC allots temporary call-signs for contests and special events. For example, in November 2007, the WPC temporarily allotted the prefixes AT and AU to selected ham operators to mark the anniversary of the birth of radio scientist Jagadish Chandra Bose. The Indian Union territory (UT) of Andaman and Nicobar Islands are assigned the prefix VU4 and the UT of Lakshadweep is assigned VU7.

Defunct call-signs include CR8 (for Portuguese India), FN8 (for French India), and AC3 (for the former kingdom of Sikkim, which merged with India in 1975).

== Organisation ==
The Wireless and Planning and Coordination Wing (WPC) is the only authorised body responsible for regulating amateur radio in India. The WPC has its headquarters in New Delhi with regional headquarters and monitoring stations in Mumbai (Bombay), Kolkata (Calcutta), and Chennai (Madras). It also has monitoring stations in Ahmedabad, Nagpur, Hyderabad, Ajmer, Bangalore, Darjeeling, Gorakhpur, Jalandhar, Goa (Betim), Mangalore, Shillong, Ranchi, Srinagar, Dibrugarh, Visakhapatnam, and Thiruvananthapuram. Set up in 1952, the organization is responsible for conducting exams, issuing licences, allotting frequency spectrum, and monitoring the airwaves. It is also responsible for maintaining the rules and regulations on amateur radio.

In India, amateur radio is governed by the Indian Wireless Telegraphs (Amateur Service) Rules, 2024, the Indian Wireless Telegraph Rules, the Indian Telegraph Act, 1885 and the Information Technology Act, 2000. Recently, it was announced that the security clearances were no longer required for the issue of amateur licenses.

== Allotted spectrum ==
The following frequency bands are permitted by the WPC for use by amateur radio operators in India.

Band	Frequency in MHz	Wavelength
6	1.820–1.860	160 m
7	3.500–3.700	80 m
7	3.890–3.900	75 m
7	7.000–7.200	40 m
7	10.100–10.150	30 m
7	14.000–14.350	20 m
7	18.068–18.168	17 m
7	21.000–21.450	15 m
7	24.890–24.990	12 m
7	28.000–29.700	10 m
8	50–54	6 m
8	144–146	2 m
9	434–438	70 cm
10	5725–5840	5 cm

== Awareness drives ==
Indian amateur radio operators number approximately 22,000. Amateur radio clubs across the country offer training courses for the Amateur Station Operator's Certificate. People interested in the hobby would be advised to get in touch with a local radio club or a local amateur radio operator who can direct them to a club that organises training programmes.

Recently, many amateur radio clubs, such as, the Indian Institute of Hams, the Amateur Radio Society of India and the South India Amateur Radio Society, have conducted physical and virtual training programmes to help more people into taking up amateur radio as one of their hobbies. These clubs also run awareness campaigns from time to time highlighting the role of amateur radio in disaster management in India.

== Activities and events ==
Popular events and activities include Amateur Radio Direction Finding, DX-peditions, hamfests, JOTA, QRP operations, Contesting, DX communications, Light House operation, and Islands on Air. One of the most popular activities is Amateur Radio Direction Finding, commonly known as a "foxhunt". Several clubs across India regularly organize foxhunts in which participants search for a hidden transmitter around the city. A foxhunt carried out in Matheran near Mumbai in 2005 by the Mumbai Amateur Radio Society was listed in the 2006 Limca Book of Records under the entry "most ham operators on horseback on a foxhunt." Despite being a popular recreational activity among hams, no organization has yet participated in an international event.

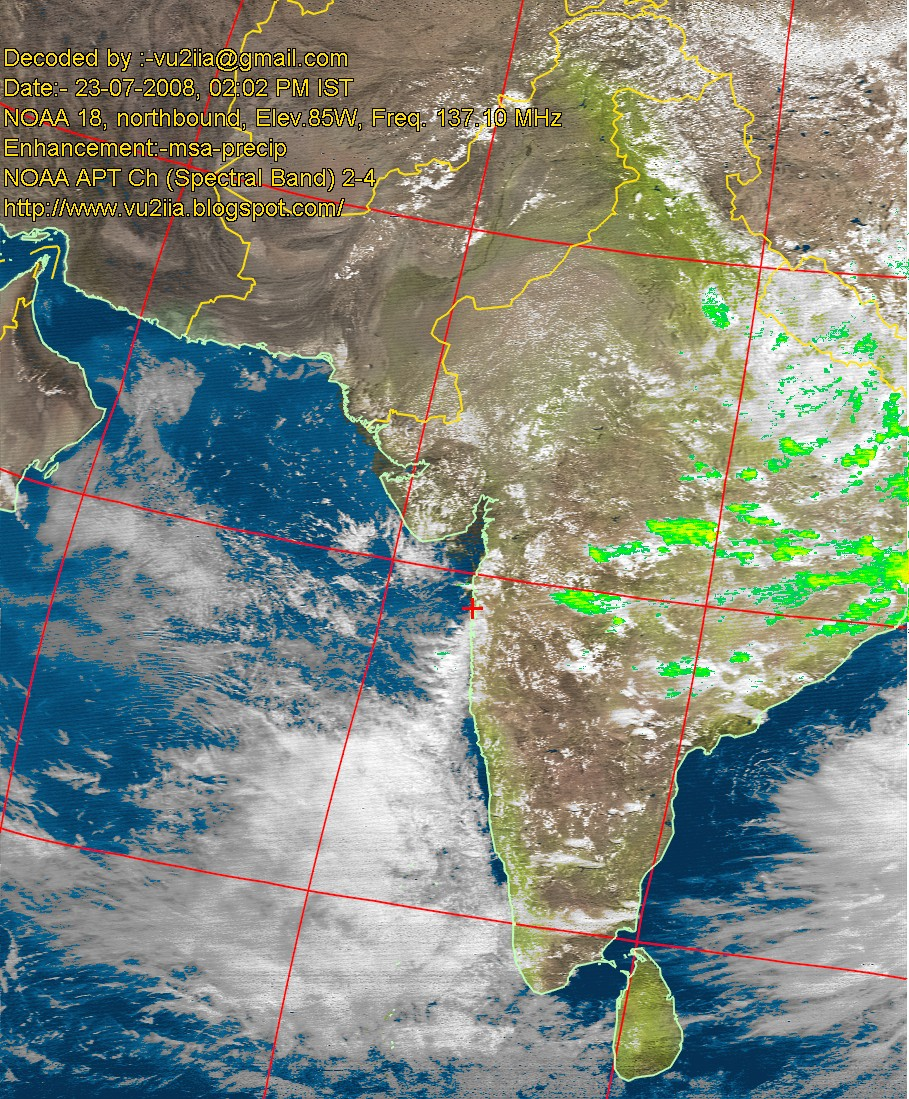
Live satellite images such as this are decoded by amateur radio operators to provide accurate weather reports during heavy rains in cities prone to flooding such as Mumbai.

Hamfest India is an annual event that serves for social gathering and comparison and sales of radio equipment. Most hamfests feature a flea market, where the attendees buy and sell equipment, generally from and for their personal stations. The event also seeks to raise amateur radio awareness in the host city. In 2008, Gandhinagar hosted the annual hamfest. Bangalore hosted the hamfest in November 2009. The 2011 hamfest was held at Kochi, Kerala.

Ham nets, where amateur radio operators "check into" are regularly conducted across India. Airnet India, Charminar Net, Belgaum Net, Karavali Net and Nite Owl's Net are some of the well-known ham nets in India.

== Amateur radio clubs ==
- Mangaluru Amateur Radio Club or MARC is an amateur radio club based in Mangaluru, India. The club was founded of 1976 by a group of active hams.

MARC engages in a number of activities, including amateur radio homebrew, amateur radio awareness campaigns, and communication support during the land slide, flooding. MARC works as per the Rules of Wireless and Planning and Coordination Wing (WPC) of the Ministry of Communications, Government of India (which issues amateur radio licences in India). The call sign of MARC is VU2RDO

- HAMBEL Amateur Radio Club: A very active amateur radio club based in Belagavi. It is one of the oldest ham radio clubs in India.
- Pune HAMs and Amateur Radio Club (PHARC): PHARC is based in Pune, Maharashtra. They have call sign VU2PHQ and maintain a VHF repeater VU2PHA at 145.100 MHz (+600 KHz).
- Bhavan's Amateur Radio Club: The club has callsign VU2BAC and was formed by the first batch of amateur radio operators successfully getting their licenses from the Indian government. The club is based at Bhavan's College in Andheri (West), Mumbai.
- JNA Wireless Association. The JNA Wireless Association is located in South Mumbai and was formed in memory of veteran ham radio operator, late JN Anklesaria. The club was using ham radio equipment donated by the family of JN Anklesaria. This club played a major role in relief operations in Osmanabad and Latur areas following the September 1993 killer earthquake at Killari.
- Space and Terrestrial Amateur Radio Society (STARS): STARS is registered under society registration act and is located in Tiruchengode, Tamilnadu.

== See also ==
- Amateur radio frequency bands in India
- Amateur Station Operator's Certificate
- Citizens Band radio in India
- Amateur radio callsigns of India
