= Amateur radio licence categories in India =

Specific categories of amateur radio licencing in India

The 1978 regulations established five categories of Amateur radio licence in India. The regulations were revised in 2009 and now only two categories are issued.

== Categories in 1978 ==
The Indian Wireless Telegraphs (Amateur Service) Rules, 1978 listed five licence categories:

1. Advanced Amateur Wireless Telegraph Station License
2. Amateur Wireless Telegraph Station License, Grade–I
3. Amateur Wireless Telegraph Station License, Grade–II
4. Restricted Amateur Wireless Telegraph Station License
5. Short Wave Listener's Amateur Wireless Telegraph Station License

To obtain a licence in the first four categories, candidates had to pass the Amateur Station Operator's Certificate examination. This examination is held monthly in Delhi, Mumbai, Kolkata and Chennai, every two months in Ahmedabad, Nagpur and Hyderabad, and every four months in some smaller cities. The examination consists of two 50-mark written sections: Radio theory and practice, Regulations; and a practical test consisting of a demonstration of Morse code proficiency in both sending and receiving. After passing the examination, the candidate must then clear Local Police and Central Home Department verification. After clearance, the WPC grants the licence along with the user-chosen call sign (if available). This procedure on an average takes 12 months.

Licence category	Age	Power	Examination	Privileges
Short Wave Listener's Amateur Wireless Telegraph Station Licence	12	—	Obtained without appearing for the examination.	A user can monitor the airwaves on short wave frequencies.
Restricted Amateur Wireless Telegraph Station Licence	12	10 W	Minimum score of 40% in each section of the written examination, and 50% overall.	Terrestrial radiotelephony transmission in two VHF frequency bands.
Amateur Wireless Telegraph Station Licence, Grade–II	12	50 W	Minimum score of 40% in each section of the written examination, and 50% overall. In addition, a demonstration of proficiency in sending and receiving Morse code at five words a minute.	Radiotelegraphy and radiotelephony transmission in 11 frequency bands.
Amateur Wireless Telegraph Station Licence, Grade–I	14	150 W	A minimum of 50% in each section of the written examination, and 55% overall, and a demonstration of proficiency in sending and receiving Morse code at 12 words a minute.	Radiotelegraphy and radiotelephony transmission in 14 frequency bands. In addition, satellite communication, facsimile, and television modes are permitted.
Advanced Amateur Wireless Telegraph Station Licence	18	400 W	A candidate must pass an advanced electronics examination, in addition to the passing the Rules and Regulations section, and a Morse code proficiency at 12 words per minute.	The maximum power permitted is 400 W in selected sub-bands.

Grade II Restricted and Grade II are now merged with Restricted Grade since 13 August 2010. Grade 1 and Advance Grade have been merged with General Grade.

== 2005 and 2009 Amendments ==
In a 2005 notification, the WPC proposed an amendment to the 1978 Amateur Service Rules in the rationalization of the licence categories to only two: the Amateur Wireless Telegraph Station Licence (General) and the Amateur Wireless Telegraph Station Licence (Restricted).

The Indian Wireless Telegraph (Amateur Service) Rules, 2009 lists two licence categories:

1. Amateur Wireless Telegraph Station Licence, General
2. Amateur Wireless Telegraph Station Licence, Restricted

By the 2009 Amendment, Licences can be renewed up to twenty years for a fee of Rs.1000/- and lifelong for Rs.2000/-

To obtain a licence, candidates must clear the Amateur Station Operator's Certificate exam, held monthly at the four metropolitan cities (Delhi, Mumbai, Kolkata and Chennai), and quarterly in other smaller towns. The exam consists of two 100-mark written sections: Radio theory and practice, Regulations; and a practical consisting of demonstration of Morse proficiency (sending and receiving).

Licence category	Age	Power	Examination.	Privileges
Amateur Wireless Telegraph Station Licence (Restricted Grade) (Formerly Grade II)	12	10 W on VHF and UHF 50 W on HF	Minimum score of 40% in each section of the written examination, and 50% overall.	Terrestrial radiotelephony transmission in VHF and UHF frequency bands and 12 HF Bands.
Amateur Wireless Telegraph Station Licence (General Grade) (Formerly Grade I and Advanced)	12	25 W on VHF and UHF 400 W on HF	Minimum score of 50% in each section of the written examination, and 55% overall. In addition, a demonstration of proficiency in sending and receiving Morse code at eight words a minute.	Radiotelegraphy and radiotelephony transmission VHF and UHF frequency bands and 12 HF Bands.

== See also ==
- Amateur radio in India
- Amateur Station Operator's Certificate
- VU Hams Social Network
