= List of amateur radio frequency bands in India =

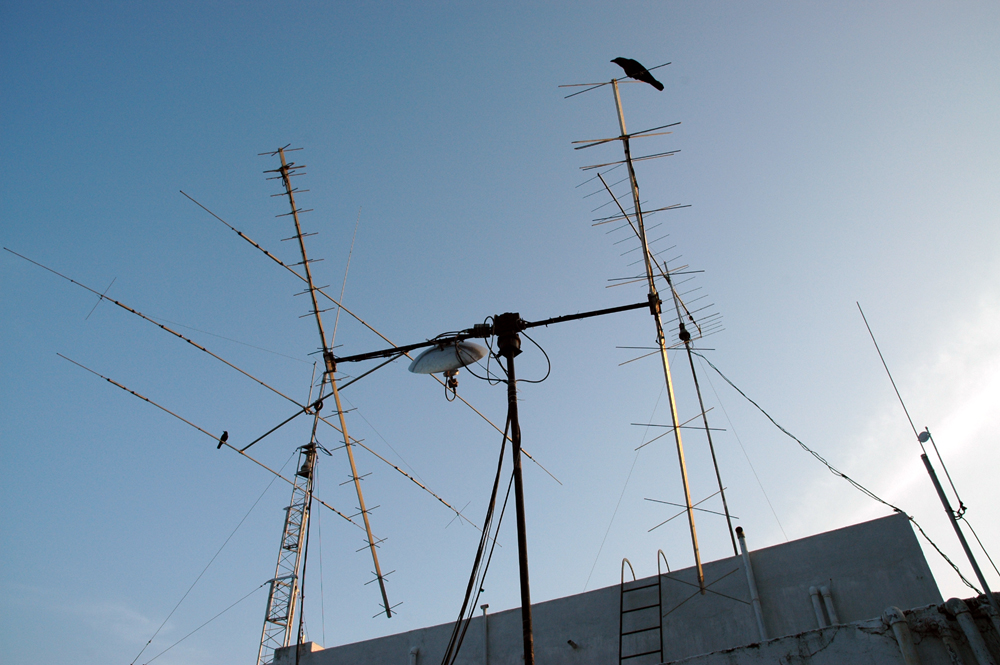
Antennas at a ham operator's station in Chennai, India

Amateur radio or ham radio is a hobby that is practised by over 16,000 licensed users in India. Licences are granted by the Wireless and Planning and Coordination Wing (WPC), a branch of the Ministry of Communications and Information Technology. In addition, the WPC allocates frequency spectrum in India. The Indian Wireless Telegraphs (Amateur Service) Rules, 1978 lists five licence categories.

To obtain a licence, candidates must pass the Amateur Station Operator's Certificate examination conducted by the WPC. The examination consists of two 50-mark written sections: Radio theory and practice, Regulations; and a practical test consisting of a demonstration of Morse code proficiency in sending and receiving. After passing the examination, the candidate must clear a police interview. After clearance, the WPC grants the licence along with the user-chosen call sign. This procedure can take up to one year. This licence is valid for up to five years.

Each licence category has certain privileges allotted to it, including the allotment of frequencies, output power, and the emission modes. This article lists the various frequencies allotted to various classes, and the corresponding emission modes and input DC power.

== Allotted spectrum ==
The following table lists the frequencies that amateur radio operators in India can operate on.

Allotted spectrum
Band (Note: Band refers to the International Telecommunication Union (ITU) radio band designation)	Frequency (MHz) (Note: Frequency is measured in megahertz)	Wavelength (Note: Wavelength is measured in metres and centimetres)	Type (Note: Type refers to the radio frequency classification)
5	0.1357–0.1378	2200 m	LF
5	0.472–0.479	630 m	MF
6	1.800–1.825	160 m	MF
7	3.500–3.700	80 m	HF
7	3.890–3.900	80 m	HF
7	5.3515–5.3665	60 m	HF
7	7.000–7.200	40 m	HF
7	10.100–10.150	30 m	HF
7	14.000–14.350	20 m	HF
7	18.068–18.168	17 m	HF
7	21.000–21.450	15 m	HF
7	24.890–24.990	12 m	HF
7	28.000–29.700	10 m	HF
8	50.000–54.000	6 m	VHF
8	144–146	2 m	VHF
9	434–440	70 cm	UHF
9	1240–1300	23 cm	UHF
9	2300–2310	13 cm	UHF
10	3300–3500	9 cm	SHF
10	5650–5850	5 cm	SHF
10	10000–10500	3 cm	SHF

== Emission designations ==
The International Telecommunication Union uses an internationally agreed system for classifying radio frequency signals. Each Type of radio emission is classified according to its bandwidth, method of modulation, nature of the modulating signal, and Type of information transmitted on the carrier signal. It is based on characteristics of the signal, not on the transmitter used.

An emission designation is of the form BBBB 123 45, where BBBB is the bandwidth of the signal, 1 is a letter indicating the Type of modulation used, 2 is a digit representing the Type of modulating signal, 3 is a letter corresponding to the Type of information transmitted, 4 is a letter indicating the practical details of the transmitted information, and 5 is a letter that represents the method of multiplexing. The 4 and 5 fields are optional. For example, an emission designation would appear read as 500H A3E, where 500H translates to 500 Hz, and A3E is the emission mode as permitted.

The WPC has authorized the following emission modes:

Emission designations
Emission	Details
A1A	Single channel containing digital information, no subcarrier, Aural telegraphy, intended to be decoded by ear, such as Morse code
A2A	Single channel containing digital information, using a subcarrier, Aural telegraphy, intended to be decoded by ear, such as Morse code
A3E	Double-sideband amplitude modulation (AM radio), Single channel containing analogue information,
A3X	Single channel containing analogue information, None of the other listed types of emission
A3F (Note: For A3F emission, the transmission is restricted to call sign of the station, location and other particulars. This is limited to point-to-point test transmission that employs a standard interlace and scanning with a bandwidth not more than 4 kHz.)	Single channel containing analogue information, Video (television signals)
F1B	Frequency modulation, Single channel containing digital information, no subcarrier, Electronic telegraphy, intended to be decoded by machine (radioteletype and digital modes)
F2B	Frequency modulation, Single channel containing digital information, using a subcarrier, Electronic telegraphy, intended to be decoded by machine (radioteletype and digital modes)
F3E	Frequency modulation, Single channel containing analogue information, Telephony (audio)
F3C	Frequency modulation, Single channel containing analogue information, Facsimile (still images)
H3E	Single-sideband with full carrier, Single channel containing analogue information, Telephony (audio)
J3E	Single-sideband with suppressed carrier (e.g. Shortwave utility and amateur stations), Single channel containing analogue information, Telephony (audio)
R3E	Single-sideband with reduced or variable carrier, Single channel containing analogue information, Telephony (audio)

== Licence categories ==
Two categories of amateur radio licence exist.

=== Restricted Grade ===
The Amateur Wireless Telegraph Station Licence, Restricted licence requires the same scores as the old term Grade II.The minimum age is 12 years. The licence allows the user to make radiotelegraphy (Morse code) and radiotelephony transmission in 12 frequency bands. The maximum power allowed is 100 W.

A Restricted Grade licence holder was previously authorized the use of radio telephony emission on frequency bands below 30 MHz on submission of proof that 100 contacts have been made with other amateur operators using CW (Morse code). This has now since changed with restricted license holders being allowed phone (SSB) bands with the only restriction being the PEP(peak envelope power) limited to 50 W. Morse Code is currently not necessary for this exam.

Restricted Grade
Band	Frequency (MHz)	Wavelength	Type	Emission	Power (W)
6	1.800–1.825 (Note: On primary shared basis as per the regular provisions of radio regulations.)	160 m	MF	A3E, H3E, J3E, R3E	50
7	3.500–3.700	80 m	HF	A3E, H3E, J3E, R3E	50
7	3.890–3.900	80 m	HF	A3E, H3E, J3E, R3E	50
7	7.000–7.200	40 m	HF	A3E, H3E, J3E, R3E	50
7	14.000–14.350	20 m	HF	A3E, H3E, J3E, R3E	50
7	18.068–18.168 (Note: Authorization on non-interference and non-protection basis.)	17 m	HF	A3E, H3E, J3E, R3E	50
7	21.000–21.450	15 m	HF	A3E, H3E, J3E, R3E	50
7	24.890–24.990	12 m	HF	A3E, H3E, J3E, R3E	50
7	28.000–29.700	10 m	HF	A3E, H3E, J3E, R3E	50
8	50.000–54.000	6 m	VHF	F1B, F2B, F3C, F3E	10 (Note: Terrestrial service only)
8	144–146	2 m	VHF	F1B, F2B, F3C, F3E	10
9	434–438 (Note: On secondary basis as per the regular provisions of radio regulations. The above authorization is subject to site clearance as per the procedure prescribed by the Standing Advisory Committee on Radio Frequency Allocation (SACFA) as applicable.)	70 cm	UHF	F1B, F2B, F3C, F3E	10

=== General Grade ===
The Amateur Station Operator's Licence, General Grade, requires a minimum of 50% in each section of the written examination, and 60% overall, and a demonstration of proficiency in sending and receiving Morse code at 8 words per minute (without errors for each). The minimum age is 12 years. The licence allows a user to make radiotelegraphy and radiotelephony transmission in 13 frequency bands. The maximum power allowed is 400 W. In addition, satellite communication, facsimile, and television modes are permitted.

General grade
Band	Frequency (MHz)	Wavelength	Type	Emission	Power (W)
6	1.800–1.825	160 m	MF	A1A, A2A, A3E, H3E, R3E, J3E, F1B, F2B, A3C, A3F	400
7	3.500–3.700	80 m	HF	A1A, A2A, A3E, H3E, R3E, J3E, F1B, F2B, F3E, F3C, A3C, A3F	400
7	3.890–3.900	80 m	HF	A1A, A2A, A3E, H3E, R3E, J3E, F1B, F2B, F3E, F3C, A3C, A3F	400
7	7.000–7.200	40 m	HF	A1A, A2A, A3E, H3E, R3E, J3E, F1B, F2B, F3E, F3C, A3C, A3F	400
7	10.100–10.150	30 m	HF	A1A, A2A, F1B, F2B,	400
7	14.000–14.350	20 m	HF	A1A, A2A, A3E, H3E, R3E, J3E, F1B, F2B, F3E, F3C, A3C, A3F	400
7	18.068–18.168	17 m	HF	A1A, A2A, A3E, H3E, R3E, J3E, F1B, F2B, F3E, F3C, A3C, A3F	400
7	21.000–21.450	15 m	HF	A1A, A2A, A3E, H3E, R3E, J3E, F1B, F2B, F3E, F3C, A3C, A3F	400
7	24.890–24.990	12 m	HF	A1A, A2A, A3E, H3E, R3E, J3E, F1B, F2B, F3E, F3C, A3C, A3F	400
7	28.000–29.700	10 m	HF	A1A, A2A, A3E, H3E, R3E, J3E, F1B, F2B, F3E, F3C, A3C, A3F	400
8	50.000–54.000	6 m	VHF	F1A, F2B, F3C, F3E	25
8	144–146	2 m	VHF	F1A, F2B, F3C, F3E	25
9	434–438	70 cm	UHF	F1A, F2B, F3C, F3E	25
9	1240–1300 (Note: Earth to satellite service only. Satellite service is permitted in accordance with radio regulations and in those cases where the maximum output RF power is 30 dbw.)	23 cm	UHF	A1A, A2A, A3E, H3E, R3E, J3E, F1B, F2B, F3E, F3C, A3X, A3F (This band rescinded, please verify with WPC)	25
10	3300–3400	9 cm	SHF	A1A, A2A, A3E, H3E, R3E, J3E, F1B, F2B, F3E, F3C, A3X, A3F (This band rescinded, please verify with WPC)	25
10	5725–5840	5 cm	SHF	F1A, F2B, F3C, F3E	25

== See also ==
- Amateur radio in India
- Amateur radio frequency allocations
