= Darab Farooqui =

Indian screenwriter

- Born: Mohd Darab Farooqui; 22 June 1975 (age 51); Jaipur, Rajasthan
- Education: Rajasthan University ( B.A.)
- Occupations: Film writer; Columnist
- Years active: 2009 - present
- Known for: Victory (2009); Tigers (2014); Dedh Ishqiya (2014); Notebook (2019); Ae Watan Mere Watan (2024)
- Parents: Shameem A Farooqui (father); Yasmeen Farooqui (mother)

Darab Farooqui (born 22 June 1975) is an Indian film writer. He has written Victory (2009), Tigers (2014), Dedh Ishqiya (2014) and Notebook (2019). He worked with Karan Johar in his latest movie called Ae Watan Mere Watan (2024) directed by Kannan Iyer.

== Early life and education ==
Darab was born on 22 June 1975 in Jaipur, Rajasthan to Shameem A Farooqui and Yasmeen Farooqui.

Darab completed his Bachelor degree from Rajasthan University as a distant learner. He also contributes to The Wire News.

He had written Naam Shaheenbagh Hai, a short poem at the time of Shaheen Bagh protest.
