= Congress Radio =

1942 underground radio station in India

Congress Radio (Azad Radio)
Bombay (unlicensed); British India
- Frequency: 7.12 MHz

Programming
- Language: English, Hindustani
- Format: News; Indian independence movement-related messaging

History
- First air date: 27 August 1942
- Last air date: 12 November 1942

Congress Radio, also known as Azad Radio, was an underground radio station that operated for about three months during the Quit India Movement of 1942, a movement launched by Mahatma Gandhi against the British Raj for independence of India. Congress Radio was the broadcasting mouthpiece of the Indian National Congress and functioned from different locations in Bombay, present-day Mumbai, and briefly from Nashik. It was organized by Usha Mehta (1920–2000), then a 22-year student activist, with the help of amateur radio operators. Others who were involved included Vithalbhai Jhaveri, Vitthaldas Khakar, Chandrakant Jhaveri, and Babubhai Thakkar. The broadcasting equipment was supplied by Nanik Motwane of Chicago Radio, Bombay. Prominent leaders of the Indian independence movement like Ram Manohar Lohia, Achyutrao Patwardhan, and Purushottam Trikamdas were also associated with Congress Radio.

The radio station broadcast from 27 August through 12 November 1942 before being shut down by the authorities, with the operators being arrested.

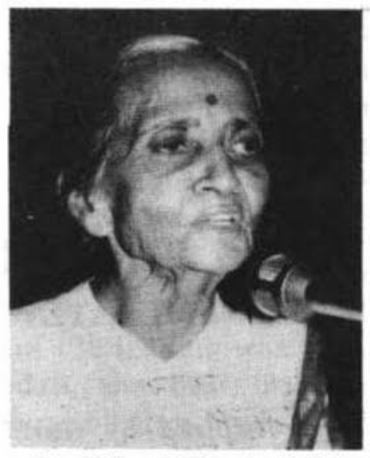
Mehta in 1996

Blitz newspaper clipping from 1946 showing Mehta's contributions to the underground radio station

== Background ==
During the Second World War, all amateur radio licenses were suspended throughout the British Empire, with operators having to surrender their broadcasting equipment. The move was intended to prevent illegal broadcasts across the country and also potentially to prevent the equipment from being used by enemies in case of capture. At the same time, All India Radio had already been set up in the country in 1923 and beamed programming that carried the then-imperial British Indian government's messages, with no space for the dissenting voices from the Indian independence movement which was rapidly gaining steam during the war time.

Between 5 and 8 August 1942, the Indian National Congress met in Bombay and issued the proclamation of Quit India Movement, demanding that the British Empire withdraw from India. During this session, Gandhi issued a cry, Do or Die in his Quit India speech. Gandhi and a few other leaders from the movement were immediately arrested, resulting in spontaneous violence across the country, demanding his release and the withdrawal of the British empire. It was at this time that student activist Usha Mehta and Congress leader Vithalbhai Jhaveri got together and decided to seek out amateur radio operators Nariman Abarbad Printer and 'Bob' Tanna to set up an underground radio broadcasting station that would broadcast messages related to the Indian independence movement and recorded speeches from some of the prominent leaders of the movement. Mehta was then twenty-two years old and a student at Wilson College studying for her master's degree.

Printer assembled the radio transmission equipment and set up the broadcasting unit with equipment being supplied by Bombay-based Chicago Radio's Nanik Motwane. Some of the other founding members of the station included Ram Manohar Lohia, who would later go on to become a socialist leader in independent India; Chandrakant Jhaveri; and Babubai Khakhar. Khakhar was also instrumental in getting the funds for setting up the station. This was not the first of the underground radio stations broadcasting in India of the time. The famous Azad Hind Radio (transl. Free India Radio) broadcast anti-British messaging by the Axis powers from locations as wide as Germany, Japan, Rangoon, Saigon, and even Singapore which was held by Japan at that time. Tanna himself had set up an amateur broadcasting set up in 1940 that he called Radio Azad Hindi (transl. Radio Free India), where he beamed messages of the Indian independence movement briefly before he was arrested by the authorities and his equipment seized.

== Operations ==
Congress Radio started with a broadcast on 27 August 1942 at 7:30 p.m. from the top floor of the Sea View building in Chowpatty Bombay with Usha Mehta, the founder of the station, announcing, "This is the Congress Radio calling on (a wavelength of) 42.34 metres from somewhere in India." The location was kept a secret and not disclosed in order to prevent the officials from cracking down. The station also separated the recording setup and the broadcast transmission setup to further reduce the probability of being caught.

The staff of the station would change their location every few days to avoid the police, moving from apartment to apartment. The station continued to broadcast recorded messages from prominent leaders of the Indian independence movement (including Mahatma Gandhi) from undisclosed locations. The station reported on incidents from across the country, countering the narratives from the official state broadcaster All India Radio. While the station started its broadcasts from the Sea View building in Chowpatty, it moved to many locations including Ajit Villa on Laburnum Road, Laxmi Bhavan on Sandhurst road, Parekh Wadi building on Girgaum back road, and finally from Paradise bungalow near Mahalakshmi temple where it ceased operations after being detected by the police. For a brief period, the radio station also moved to Nashik where it broadcast from the Shankaracharya math. Perhaps to avoid getting caught in a police raid, the transmission equipment was immersed into the nearby Godavari river. Signals were broadcast on the then-unoccupied 40-metre band. The then-government was able to jam the radio signal occasionally, but the station's broadcasts were heard across the country and as far away as Japanese-occupied Burma.

=== Programming ===
The station's programming started with a broadcast of Sare Jahan se Accha, written by Muhammad Iqbal, and ended the day with a broadcast of Bankim Chandra Chatterjee's Vande Mataram, a song that would go on to become the national song of Independent India. English news on the station was read by Ram Manohar Lohia, Coomi Dastur, Achyut Patwardhan, Moinuddin Harris, and Usha Mehta. Mehta also read the news in Hindustani.

The station initially broadcast recorded messages and talk by leaders of the Indian independence movement. The news broadcasts included sensitive subjects that were at that time not covered by the newspapers. Speaking about the role that the station played in covering the political movement, Mehta had said, "When the press is gagged and all news banned, our transmitter certainly helps a good deal in furnishing the public with the facts of the happenings and in spreading the message of rebellion in the remotest corners of the country."

In addition to these recorded messages, the station also broadcast messages linked to freedom, secularism, and internationalism. Congress Radio regularly spoke up on the atrocities committed by British soldiers and administrators. In one broadcast, it addressed the topic of mass rapes by British soldiers, calling them the "most bestial thing that one could imagine" and asking for citizens to stand up to rape; other broadcasts discussed the plights of one woman raped in a police van and another who had been carrying food to political prisoners before being sexually assaulted, both in the Central Provinces. Another broadcast touted the values of secularism and spoke about the need for unity between the Hindu and Muslim communities. The station also carried messages to workers and peasants, Indian soldiers, and students, directing their participation in the Quit India Movement. The station also took the message of the Indian movement beyond the country and preached internationalism.

=== Detection and shutdown ===
The British imperial home ministry and the local All India Radio station learnt of the station's broadcasts within three days. However, they were not able to trace them to a source, as operators would mask their location. The special branch of the CID stepped in and started monitoring the broadcasts starting 8 October 1942. Stenographers from the police department were brought in to transcribe the broadcasts. Printer was captured by the authorities for his association with the station. He later led the police to Paradise bungalow near Mahalakshmi temple in Bombay, location of the final broadcast on 12 November 1942. It was noted that the station was playing "Vande Mataram", the song it used when signing off for the day, when it was shut down.

Mehta and the operating crew were arrested and imprisoned at the end of the last broadcast. Mehta was subjected to a secret trial in a special court, in what was called the Radio Conspiracy case, and was sentenced to five years of rigorous imprisonment at the Yerawada prison in Pune on 13 May 1943. For his cooperation, Printer was provided immunity from prosecution for his support to the Crown.

== In popular culture ==
=== Film and Web Series ===
- Ae Watan Mere Watan (transl. Oh Country My Country) is a 2024 Hindi-language historical biographical film about India's struggle for freedom in 1942, based on the life of Usha Mehta, a brave young girl who starts an underground radio station to spread the message of unity, setting off a thrilling chase with the British authorities during the Quit India movement. It is written and directed by Kannan Iyer and produced by Karan Johar, starring Sara Ali Khan as Mehta. The film was premiered on 21 March 2024 on Amazon Prime Video.

== See also ==
- Amateur radio in India
- Usha Mehta

== Published works ==
- Thakkar, Usha (2021). Congress Radio: Usha Mehta and the underground radio station of 1942. Viking Press / Penguin Books. ISBN 978-0-670-09566-7. OCLC 1290013990.
- Sengupta, Syamalendu; Chatterjee, Gautam (1988). Secret Congress Broadcasts and Storming Railway Tracks During Quit India Movement. Navrang. ISBN 978-81-7013-050-5.
- Gupta, Indra (2004). India's 50 most illustrious women (2nd ed.). New Delhi: Icon Publications. ISBN 81-88086-03-7. OCLC 858639936.
