= Chicago Radio =

Indian manufacturer of public address systems

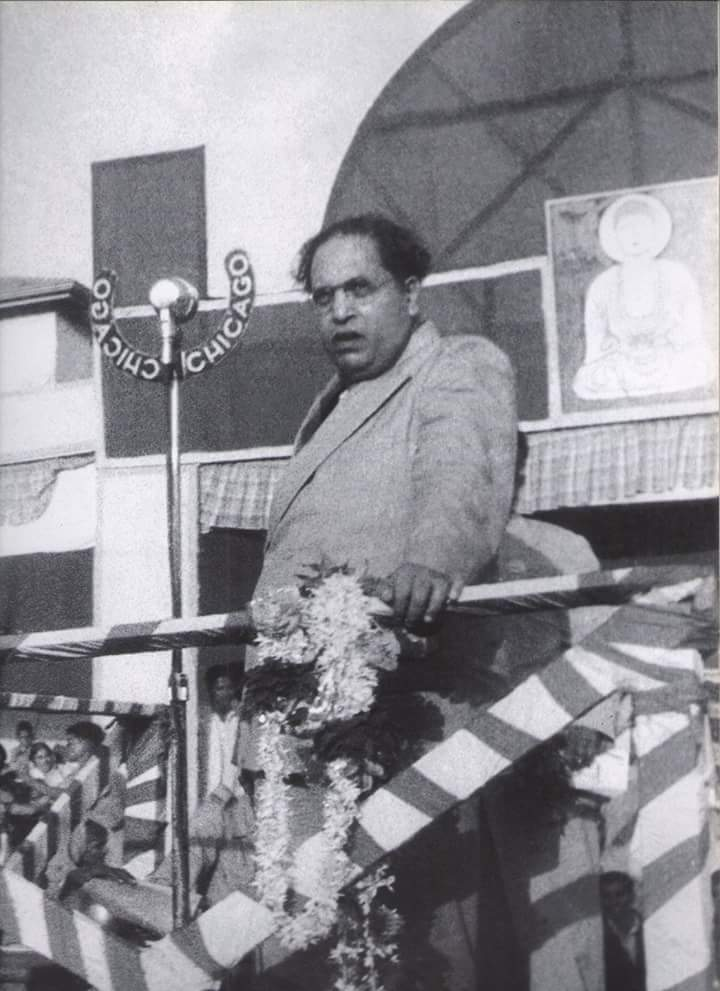
Indian jurist and future minister B. R. Ambedkar speaking into a Chicago Radio system in 1935

Chicago Radio is an Indian manufacturer of public address systems, closely associated with the pro-independence Indian National Congress during the last decades of the British Raj. The company was established by Gianchand Chandumal Motwane in 1909 as the Eastern Electric & Trading Company. It changed its name to the Chicago Telephone Supply Company in 1919 when it moved from Sindh to Bombay. The company served as a distributor for an American company of the same name, but retained the branding when the American firm went out of business. Under Gianchand's son Nanik the company began a close association with the Congress, providing public address systems at numerous meetings and speeches. The company provided this support on a pro bono basis until the 1960s. It remains in business on a small scale, as Motwane Communication Systems Pvt. Ltd.

== Early years ==
The Eastern Electric & Trading Company was founded in the city of Sukkur in Sindh (now in Pakistan) in 1909 by Gianchand Chandumal Motwane, a former telegraphy engineer for the North Western State Railway. The company dealt in equipment such as torches, batteries and generators and, later, in telephones. Motwane moved the company headquarters to Karachi in 1912. In 1919 Motwane moved to Bombay (now Mumbai) and changed the company name to the Chicago Telephone Supply Company. The company was now dealing in radio, telecommunication and loudspeaker equipment with the permission of, and on behalf of, its main supplier, the Chicago Telephone Supply Company of the United States. The American company later went out of business but Motwane retained the use of the name.

The company was renamed the Chicago Telephone & Radio Company in 1926. Motwane imported microphones, amplifiers and loudspeakers from Britain and the United States and had a team of five engineers in India who examined and reverse engineered them.

== Association with Congress ==
Motwane's son, Nanik, was an activist for the pro-independence Indian National Congress. Attending a 1929 meeting led by Mahatma Gandhi he noticed that Gandhi, who had a weak speaking voice, had trouble being heard by large crowds and had to move between small groups repeating his words. Nanik determined to remedy the situation; two years later he had a public address system ready for the 1931 Karachi party meeting at which the party declared its commitment to Purna Swaraj "complete independence". Gandhi said after the meeting that "the cheers that punctuated my remarks on some of the most important amendments showed that the listeners were following my exposition with the utmost attention. All this was possible because of the perfect Chicago Radio loudspeaker arrangements that were made for the Subjects Committee as well as for the Open Sessions". Chicago Radio became closely associated with Congress thereafter and, indeed, initially offered public address services only to the party.

Nanik travelled frequently to Congress meetings, carrying his public address equipment by truck and train. He typically arrived the day before the meeting to set up the system, with loudspeakers on bamboo poles, and to make sure all the batteries were charged. Eventually Chicago Radio amassed 100 public address systems which were stationed across India to minimise haulage distances. Chicago Radio also recorded many of the speeches and provided the tapes to the party; with an eye to self-promotion Chicago Radio also employed cameramen and photographers to film and photograph Congress politicians using their equipment. The company developed the Chicago Radio Conference Interpretation System to simultaneously translate speech into other languages before rebroadcast. Chicago Radio covered around six meetings a month for the first thirty years of its association with Congress. At its peak the company employed 200 people and had factories in two cities and servicing workshops in many others.

Chicago Radio became a limited company in 1936. Nanik and his brother Visharam became partners in 1937; their father Gianchand, the founder of the company, died in 1943. Nanik became involved in the underground, and illegal, pro-independence Congress Radio in 1942. He was arrested and held for a month before being released. Despite this Chicago Radio seems to have escaped British suspicion and, indeed, British India police purchased their own radio equipment from the company. Chicago Radio equipment was used for Prime Minister Jawaharlal Nehru's 1947 "Tryst with Destiny" speech on India's first Independence Day. After one speech Nehru wrote to the company to state that their "loudspeakers did the most excellent work and the arrangements were very much appreciated by all".

== Post-independence ==
After the independence of India in 1947 and related partition the company lost its holdings in the new country of Pakistan. A Chicago Radio system was used during the landmark 1963 performance of "Aye Mere Watan Ke Logo" by singer Lata Mangeshkar in the aftermath of the Indian defeat in the Sino-Indian War, on Republic Day (26 January) at the National Stadium in New Delhi in the presence of President Sarvepalli Radhakrishnan and Prime Minister Jawaharlal Nehru. It was only in the 1960s that the company began charging Congress for use of its equipment, though it continued to offer the systems at cost price. In the 1970s the firm was written to by prime minister Indira Gandhi asking why it persisted in using a foreign name. Nanik resisted any change but altered his microphones to read "Chicago" on one side and "Motwane" on the other.

The company remains in business on a small scale selling public address and intercom systems, as of 2022. It is now known as Motwane Communication Systems Pvt. Ltd and maintains a factory at Bangalore.
