= Indian Telegraph Act, 1885 =

Repealed Indian statute

Imperial Legislative Council
- Long title: An Act to amend the law relating to Telegraphs in India
- Enacted by: Imperial Legislative Council
- Enacted: 22 July 1885
- Effective: 1 October 1885

Amended by
- The Repealing Act, 1938; The Indian Telegraph (Amendment) Act, 2003

Repealed by
- Telecommunications Act, 2023
- Status: Repealed

The Indian Telegraph Act, 1885 was the enabling legislation in India which governed the use of wired and wireless telegraphy, telephones, teletype, radio communications and digital data communications. It gives the Government of India exclusive jurisdiction and privileges for establishing, maintaining, operating, licensing and oversight of all forms of wired and wireless communications within Indian territory. It also authorizes government law enforcement agencies to monitor/intercept communications and tap phone lines under conditions defined within the Indian Constitution. The act came into force on 1 October 1885. Since that time, numerous amendments have been passed to update the act to respond to changes in technology.

The legislation was repealed after the passage of the Telecommunications Bill 2023.

== Background ==
The Indian Telegraph Act, passed in 1883, was intended to give the Central Government power to establish telegraph lines on private as well as public property. At the time the Act was conceived, India was still under the rule of the British Raj. Telegraph was first installed in 1851 and a trans-India telegraph was completed three years later in 1854. The telegraph had become, in the intervening thirty years, an important tool for British dominion over India by quelling rebellions and consolidating information. It was thus important for the British to have control of telegraphy and infrastructure across the subcontinent.

== Legal interception of communications by law enforcement agencies ==
Indian laws do not allow disclosure of information pertaining to court authorised interception and communications data.

“Section 5 (2) of the Indian Telegraph Act 1885 – read with rule 419 (A) of Indian Telegraph (Amendment) Rules 2007 obliges telecommunications service providers to maintain extreme secrecy in matters concerning lawful interception. Further, under Rule 25(4) of the IT (Procedure and Safeguards for Interception, Monitoring and Decryption of Information) Rules, 2009 (Interception Rules) and Rule 11 of the IT (Procedure and Safeguards for Monitoring and Collecting Traffic Data or Information) Rules, 2009 (the ‘Traffic Data Rules’), ‘strict confidentiality shall be maintained’ in respect of directions for lawful interception, monitoring, decryption or collection of data traffic,”

== Section 7 ==
The following rules were made under the powers conferred by this section:

- The Indian Wireless Telegraph Rules, 1949
- The Indian Wireless Telegraph Rules, 1973

== Miscellaneous ==
The ownership and operation of satellite communications systems and amateur radio equipment is strictly regulated in India.

=== Satellite phones ===
Satellite phones have to either be purchased in India from an authorized distributor or can be imported into India after receiving permission from the Department of Telecommunications (DoT). Following the Mumbai terror attacks in 2011, the Directorate General of Shipping (DGS) banned the use of Thuraya and Iridium satellite phones and infrastructure in 2012; restrictions were already in place in 2010, for similar reasons, under provisions in the Indian Telegraph Act.

Passengers importing satellite telephone as baggage shall be required to declare the same to the Customs on arrival at immigration and customs checkpoints. Circular No.37 / 2010-Customs states that "satellite phone declared to Customs shall be allowed clearance subject to production of permission for use from DoT, Government of India." (...) "Satellite phones imported for use in India without a valid permission of DoT may be detained and appropriate action in accordance with the law may be initiated."

Indian media reports mention that National Technical Research Organisation (NTRO) has capability to detect, intercept and record phone communications using land and satellite-based communications link monitoring systems. Scientists at Indian Institutes of Technology (IIT) have cracked GEO-Mobile Radio Interface GMR-1 and GMR-2 encryption algorithms. NTRO and ISRO can access archived data from Technology Experiment Satellite (TES), Cartosat-2A and Cartosat-2B besides two Radar Imaging Satellites namely RISAT-1 & RISAT-2.

=== Amateur radio ===
Amateur radio equipment can only be imported and operated in India with approval from Wireless Planning and Coordination Wing (WPC) of the DoT. Indian amateur radio licence and VU- call-sign is mandatory for operating any category of amateur radio equipment within Indian territory. Indian amateur radio exams can only be taken by Indian citizens. Foreign passport holders can apply for reciprocal Indian licences based upon a valid amateur radio call-sign from their country of residence. Amateur Station Operator's Certificate and licences always bear mention of location of transmitting equipment. Portable and mobile amateur radio stations require explicit permission from WPC. Amateur radio operators from United States of America do not have automatic reciprocity in India. Use of a FCC call-sign is prohibited by law. Ownership of amateur radio equipment and station operation on Indian territory of a US FCC call-sign obtained through ARRL Volunteer Examiner Coordinators (VEC) examination is illegal.

=== Radio receivers for plane-spotting ===
Use of any category of radio equipment for plane-spotting requires permission from Wireless Planning & Coordination (WPC) wing of the DoT. Signal acquisition of any category within the radio spectrum outside of public licence-free broadcast frequencies needs approval from Wireless Planning & Coordination (WPC) wing of the DoT. Reception of radio traffic from Government or law-enforcement and defence organisations is strictly forbidden.

Import and operation of radio scanners or radio communications receivers capable of listening to HF VHF UHF and satellite aircraft or maritime radio frequencies is tolerated if user has an appropriate amateur/maritime/aircraft radio licence.

== See also ==
- Amateur radio in India
- Amateur radio call-signs of India
- Telecommunications Act, 2023
