= Ek Thi Daayan =

2013 Indian film by Kannan Iyer

- Theatrical release poster
- Directed by: Kannan Iyer
- Written by: Mukul Sharma; Vishal Bhardwaj
- Based on: Mobius Trips by Mukul Sharma
- Produced by: Ekta Kapoor; Shobha Kapoor; Vishal Bhardwaj; Rekha Bhardwaj
- Starring: Emraan Hashmi; Huma Qureshi; Konkona Sen Sharma; Kalki Koechlin
- Cinematography: Saurabh Goswami
- Edited by: A. Sreekar Prasad
- Music by: Songs: Vishal Bhardwaj; Score: Clinton Cerejo
- Production companies: ALT Entertainment; VB Pictures
- Distributed by: Balaji Motion Pictures
- Release date: 19 April 2013
- Country: India
- Language: Hindi
- Budget: ₹24–26 crore
- Box office: ₹40.25 crore

Ek Thi Daayan (There once was a witch) is a 2013 Indian Hindi-language supernatural horror thriller film directed by Kannan Iyer, adapted from the short story Mobius Trips by Mukul Sharma. The film stars Emraan Hashmi, Huma Qureshi, Konkona Sen Sharma and Kalki Koechlin. The film is co-produced by Ekta Kapoor, Shobha Kapoor, Vishal Bhardwaj and Rekha Bhardwaj. It was released on 19 April 2013 to positive reviews from critics and was a moderate success at the box-office.

Konkona Sen Sharma received critical acclaim for her performance and was nominated for Best Supporting Actress at the 59th Filmfare Awards.

== Plot ==
Bejoy "Bobo" Charan Mathur is India's top magician, but, unknown to everyone, his life is falling apart. He is drawn to his family's old, vacant apartment and hallucinations of his dead six-year-old sister, Misha, threaten his sanity, though he cannot remember how she died. He finally seeks psychiatric help from the odd Dr. Palit, who has known him since he was a child. Dr. Palit puts him under regression hypnosis to go back to the past, when Bobo was 11 and Misha was 6, and recover his memory.

Bobo and Misha lived with their single father in an apartment after their mother's death. One day, Bobo finds and reads a book about witchcraft, where he learns the number 666 takes you to hell. He uses it to take the elevator to an unlisted floor at the bottom of their building; he tells Misha the floor is the entrance to hell. According to Bobo, each building has its own hell, where the "bad residents" of the building are consigned for eternity once they are dead. Shortly after this elevator visit, a woman named Diana moves into their building. Bobo is convinced that she is a daayan who surfaced from hell, following his and Misha's trip on the elevator.

Diana charms Bobo's father and marries him. Bobo learns that a daayan's source of power is her plait. On Diana's birthday, which is Leap year, during the night of the red moon, she sacrifices Misha to restore her dark powers. Bobo and his father discover Misha's corpse inside the trunk and a now-undisguised Diana over her body. Diana kills Bobo's father with her ear-piercing screams. As she performs the rest of her ritual, the distraught Bobo cuts off Diana's plait, destroying her source of power. Diana crumbles into dust, but tells him that she did this for him and will return.

Dr. Palit dismisses Bobo's visions as fantasy. Bobo and his girlfriend Tamara marry and adopt ten-year-old Zubin. One day, a younger woman named Lisa Dutt attends Bobo's magic show and buys his family's old apartment. Everyone loves her, but Bobo suspects that the witch is back in the form of Lisa. During Lisa's housewarming party, Tamara falls off the balcony and is hospitalized. Bobo believes Lisa pushed her. Afraid for his family, he calls Dr. Palit for help.

Dr. Palit finds something disturbing and calls Bobo, but Diana appears and kills him. Bobo finds Dr. Palit dead; a paper in his hand has Zubin's name. Bobo finds Zubin missing, rushes back to his family's old apartment and takes the elevator to hell.

There, he finds Zubin lying on an altar to be sacrificed for the witch's powers. In a twist, it is revealed that Tamara is the witch, not Lisa. Diana appears and tells him that he is a Pishacha, because no average person can simply push a button in an elevator and find hell. Tamara knocks him unconscious.

Bobo wakes up and remembers reading that a Pishacha can regain his strength on the night of a red moon, and today is the night of the red moon. With his newly acquired powers, he kills Tamara and returns his powers to Satan. The witch, in the form of Diana, reveals that only an innocent person can kill a witch, and since Bobo killed her once before, he is no longer innocent. Zubin saves Bobo by cutting off Diana's plait, but the crumbling witch promises that she will return again.

In the end, Bobo meets Lisa, and she asks why he was so aggressive towards her in the beginning. Bobo tells her that he thought she was a witch.

== Cast ==
- Emraan Hashmi as Bejoy "Bobo" Charan Mathur
  - Vishesh Tiwari as Young Bobo
- Huma Qureshi as Tamara
- Konkona Sen Sharma as Diana / Lisa Dutt (fake)
- Kalki Koechlin as Lisa Dutt
- Pawan Malhotra as Professor Charan Mathur, Bobo's father
- Rajatava Dutta as Dr. Ranjan Palit, Bobo's psychiatrist
- Bhavesh Balchandani as Zubin Mathur
- Sara Arjun as Misha Mathur, Bobo's sister
- Vikas Shrivastav as Police Inspector
- Pallavi Batra as Sangeeta
- Shireena Sambyal as Anna
- Vidyadhar Karmakar as Old Man
- Deepali Pansare as Old Man's Nurse

== Production ==
Rani Mukerji was initially offered to portray the role of Liza. The film was shot at Filmcity. According to director Kannan Iyer, leopards entered the sets during shooting. The uninvited guest was later apparently shooed away.

== Marketing ==
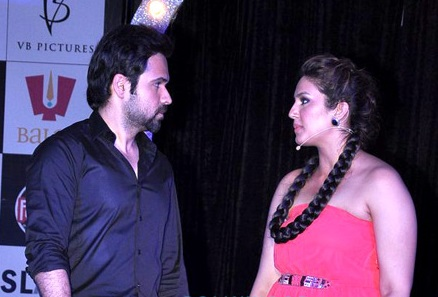
Hashmi and Qureshi during the promotions of the film.

Ekta Kapoor directed the marketing campaign for film. She produced a mini-series aired on the channel Life OK titled Ek Thhi Naayka starring the top actress of Indian Television from her shows, including Smriti Irani, Sakshi Tanwar, Shweta Tiwari, Aamna Shariff, Mouli Ganguly, Ankita Lokhande, Kritika Kamra and Pooja Gaur.

== Soundtrack ==
Ek Thi Daayan

Soundtrack album by Vishal Bhardwaj
- Released: 2013
- Recorded: 2013
- Genre: Feature film soundtrack
- Length: 26:59
- Language: Hindi
- Label: Sony Music India
- Producer: Vishal Bhardwaj

Vishal Bhardwaj chronology
| Matru Ki Bijlee Ka Mandola (2013) | Ek Thi Daayan (2013) | Dedh Ishqiya (2014) |

The music of Ek Thi Daayan was composed by Vishal Bhardwaj, with lyrics written by Gulzar. The background score was composed by Clinton Cerejo. Musicperk.com rated the album 7/10 quoting "This album does impress in parts but fails to make a lasting impression."

Track listing
| No. | Title | Singer(s) | Length |
|---|---|---|---|
| 1. | "Yaaram" | Sunidhi Chauhan, Clinton Cerejo | 4:53 |
| 2. | "Totey Ud Gaye" | Suresh Wadkar, Sukhwinder Singh, Rekha Bhardwaj | 3:55 |
| 3. | "Kaali Kaali" | Clinton Cerejo | 6:00 |
| 4. | "Lautungi Main" | Rekha Bhardwaj | 6:18 |
| 5. | "Sapna Re Sapna" | Padmanabh Gaikwad | 5:53 |
| Total length: | | | 26:59 |

== Release and reception ==
=== Critical reception ===
The film received a mainly positive response with praise particularly for Konkona Sen Sharma, as well as Huma Qureshi and Kalki Koechlin. On the review aggregator website Rotten Tomatoes, 80% of 5 critics' reviews are positive. Taran Adarsh of Bollywood Hungama gave Ek Thi Daayan 4.3 stars out of 5 and called it "An imaginative and appealing supernatural thriller". Meena Iyer of The Times of India awarded it 3.5 out of 5 while remarking "Woven beautifully between the world of magic, occult and suspense, Ek Thi Daayan, makes for compulsive viewing, providing some spine-chilling thrills at short gaps". Raja Sen of Rediff gave it 3 out of 5 star, noting,"Ek Thi Daayan isn't the scariest of horror films. It is, though, smartly crafted, highly original in its approach and a strikingly ambitious effort for the genre".

=== Box office ===
Ek Thi Daayan opened at around 30-40% occupancy with better opening in multiplexes rather than single screens where it collected around ₹6.24 crore (US$670,000) on its first day. The film did not show any growth further and netted around ₹15.5 crore (US$1.7 million) over the weekend. Despite low growth over the weekend, the film came out with good total of around ₹ 25 crore in its first week. Ek Thi Daayan grossed over ₹40.25 crore (US$4.3 million) during its entire theatrical run.
