= Telecommunications Act, 2023 =

Act of the Parliament of India

Parliament of India
- Long title: An Act to amend and consolidate the law relating to development, expansion and operation of telecommunication services and telecommunication networks; assignment of spectrum; and for matters connected therewith or incidental thereto.
- Citation: Act No. 44 of 2023
- Territorial extent: India
- Passed by: Lok Sabha
- Passed: 20 December 2023
- Passed by: Rajya Sabha
- Passed: 21 December 2023
- Assented to by: President of India
- Assented to: 25 December 2023

Legislative history

Initiating chamber: Lok Sabha
- Bill title: Telecommunications Bill, 2023
- Bill citation: Bill No. 194 of 2023
- Introduced by: Ashwini Vaishnaw
- Introduced: 18 December 2023
- Passed: 20 December 2023
- Voting summary: Majority (Voice Vote) voted for; Minority (Voice Vote) voted against

Revising chamber: Rajya Sabha
- Passed: 21 December 2023
- Voting summary: Majority Voice voted for; Minority Voice voted against

Repeals
- Indian Telegraph Act, 1885; Indian Wireless Telegraphy Act, 1933
- Status: In force

The Telecommunications Act, 2023 (Act No. 44 of 2023) is an act of the Parliament of India to replace the Indian Telegraph Act, 1885. It aims to consolidate laws relating to the development, expansion and operation of telecommunication services and networks.

== Background and timeline ==
On 20 December 2023, the Telecommunications bill, 2023 was passed by the Lok Sabha.

On 21 December 2023, the Telecommunications bill, 2023 was passed in the Rajya Sabha.

The Bill replaces the Indian Telegraph Act of 1885 with a comprehensive framework for the telecom sector.

The key provisions of the Bill are:

1. Regulation of OTT Services: The bill proposes to bring over-the-top (OTT) services under the definition of telecommunications. This would subject them to similar regulations as traditional telecom services, potentially raising concerns about privacy and freedom of expression.

2. Government powers: The bill grants the government wide-ranging powers, including the ability to:

- Suspend or prohibit use of telecom equipment from countries or individuals for national security reasons.
- Take over, manage, or suspend any or all telecommunication services or networks in the interest of national security.
- Waive entry fees, license fees, penalties, etc., to promote consumer interests, market competition, or national security.

3. Spectrum allocation: The bill introduces a new system for allocating spectrum for satellite broadband services. This could potentially benefit rural areas and bridge the digital divide.

4. Other provisions: The bill also includes provisions for:

- Promoting research and development in the telecom sector.
- Protecting consumer rights and ensuring data privacy.
- Facilitating the deployment of new technologies like 5G.

== Reactions ==
Concerns have been raised about the potential for government overreach and content censorship, as the bill grants broad powers to regulate online content.

The bill's provisions granting wide-ranging powers to the government, including suspension of services and equipment bans, have been criticized as giving excessive control and potentially jeopardizing fundamental rights like freedom of expression and privacy. Critics argue that the drafting and consultation process for the bill has been opaque and lacked sufficient involvement of key stakeholders, leading to concerns about its effectiveness and fairness.

The bill's data localization requirements, which mandate storing user data within India, raise concerns about potential misuse and surveillance by the government or third parties.

Provisions for interception and decryption of communications further add to worries about the protection of personal information and online privacy.
