= E. P. Metcalfe =

Edward Parr Metcalfe FInstP FASc (1880–30 November 1949) was the former vice chancellor and Professor of Physics, and Principal of Central College of Bangalore University. He served as Vice-Chancellor of Mysore University from 1930 to 1937.

A student of J.J. Thomson, Metcalfe graduated from University College London. He taught physics at Central College Bangalore from 1907 to 1929. He was instrumental in establishing a residential college for women in Mysore in science and arts in the early 1930s. The Maharani's College, Mysore, and the Intermediate College For Women, Bangalore were merged was recommended to be merged by the committee headed by Metcalfe.

Metcalfe also set up the first short wave entertainment and public broadcasting station (VU6AH) in India. It broadcast general entertainment. E.P. Metcalfe, the inaugural Principal of Government Arts College in Rajahmundry, East Godavari, Andhra Pradesh, is remembered for his enduring contributions, and as a tribute to his work, a hostel was established in his name.

== See also ==
- Amateur radio in India
- Mysore University
