= Citizens band radio in India =

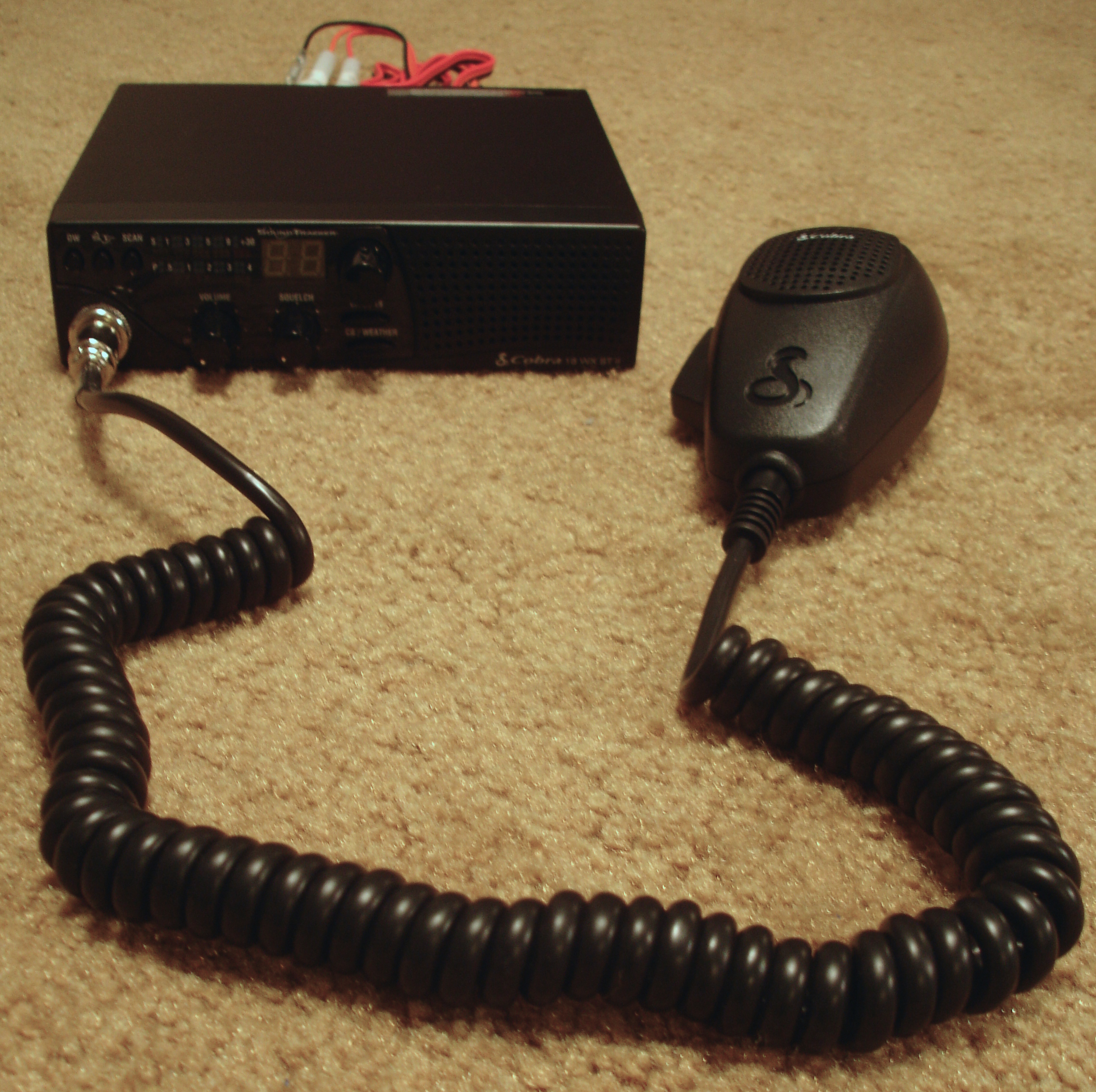
Cobra 18 WX ST II mobile CB radio with microphone

Citizens band radio (also known as CB radio) is a system of short-distance radio communications between individuals on a selection of channels within the 27-MHz (11 m) band. In India, this frequency band extends from 26.957 MHz to 27.283 MHz. There are several different channel plans in use. Citizens band is distinct from the Family Radio Service, GMRS, Multi-Use Radio Service and amateur radio (Ham). In many countries CB operation does not require a license, and (unlike amateur radio) it may be used for business or personal communications. Like many other two-way radio services, any citizens band channel is shared by many users. Only one station may transmit in a channel at a time; other stations must listen and wait for the shared channel to be available. Also, the system works in half-duplex mode, which means we may transmit and receive information, but not both at the same time.

== Legislation guiding usage of CB radio equipment ==
The establishment of, maintenance of, working with, possession of or dealing with in wireless equipment operating in citizens band was exempted from licensing under the Indian Telegraph Act, 1933 and the Indian Wireless Telegraphy Act, 1933, by Notification No G.S.R. 533(E) dated 12 August 2005 (published in the Gazette of India Extraordinary dated 12 August 2005).

After the aforesaid legislation, an amendment to the Use of low power equipment in the Citizen band 26.957 – 27.283 MHz (Exemption from Licensing Requirement) Rules, 2005 (hereafter referred to as the "Rules, 2005" for brevity) was made vide Notification No G.S.R. 35(E) dated 10 January 2007 (published in Gazette of India Extraordinary dated 22 January 2007). By the Amendment, amongst other changes, Rule 4 was amended to include an opportunity of the user of the unlicensed equipment to relocate equipment, reduce its power, use special antennae, or discontinue use of such unlicensed radio equipment as exempted under the Rules, 2005. The Amendment also provided for a reasonable opportunity to be given to such user to explain the circumstances of usage which caused harmful interference with use of licensed equipment by a licensed user. The aforesaid amended Rules, 2005 are governing the licensing of CB radio equipment and its usage in India now.(No Reference regarding this anyone viewing please add)

== Regulation in India ==
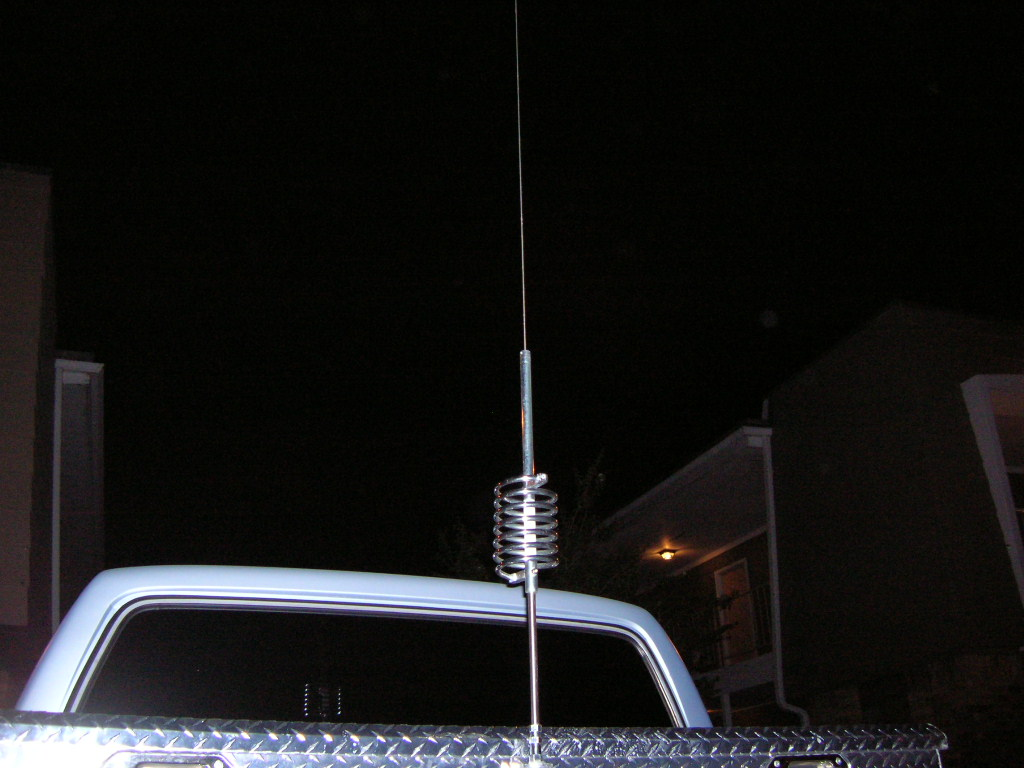
Typical center-loaded mobile CB antenna. Note the loading coil, which shortens the antenna's overall length.

The channel assignments in India are different from the band plans used elsewhere. The Indian band plan consists of 40 frequencies spaced a relatively tight eight kHz apart, plus a few offset channels used for mountaineering and radio-controlled devices. Many of the channels are reserved for specific purposes such as forestry, disaster relief, and sporting events. The frequency band allocated for this purpose in India is 26.957-27.283 MHz. Nonetheless, the effective radiating power used for Citizens Band is limited within 5 Watt in India. PMR Frequency 446 MHz with maximum 0.5W(Erp) also allowed as Licence Free in India since 2018. According to GSR 1047(E) dated 18 October 2018.

== CB band plan ==
It appears that, as of 2015, several CB manufacturers and distributors are now shipping radios with the India CB band programmed in them. These are generally "multi-norm" radios that provide the user with flexibility in regards to different frequency plans and mode (AM, FM, SSB) regulations. President, AnyTone, CRT and other companies are including the "IN" country as an option now. The channel plan programmed in these radios does not match up with the channel plan listed below (odd offset plan starting at 26.964 MHz for channel 1). Instead, the channel plan used is similar to the European standardized 40 channel CB band (AM and FM mode allowed, 4 watts FM, 1 watt AM carrier power for 4 watts peak power – within compliance of the 5 watt limit for India). However, due to the frequency allocation in India being 26.957 – 27.283 MHz, the band plan is 27 channels. Starting with 26.965 MHz for channel 1 and ending at 27.275 MHz for channel 27. This band plan (26.960 – 27.280 MHz) is within the limits prescribed by the Ministry of Communications and Information Technology (Wireless Planning and Coordination Wing). There does not appear to be an official CB channel-to-frequency table as part of the legislation listed as a reference for the "offset" frequency plan. Only the frequency range and power output limits are specified.

It is therefore likely that the "offset" frequency plan originally listed (44 channels in plan total, 11 R/C remote control channels, no mode (AM or FM) specified, no channel number associated, etc. It is possible that the older 44/33 channel list is obsolete, as no radios are produced that offer the offset frequency plan. However, it is probable that both channel plans are currently in use in India, and this will likely continue into the foreseeable future. The 27-channel plan offers wider channel spacing to reduce interference, compatibility with internationally agreed channel plans, and provision for five dedicated and one shared remote control (R/C) for toys, aircraft, boats, telemetry, paging and other non-voice communications. Channels 1–27 are the same as the channels 1–27 for the USA, Australian, and European Union standard channel plans. Not included are the five dedicated R/C frequencies 26.995 MHz, 27.045 MHz, 27.095 MHz, 27.145 MHz, 27.195 MHz and the shared R/C and CB voice frequency of Channel 23 – 27.255 MHz.

India CB channels
Frequency [MHz]	Usage
26.964	Hobbyist comms
26.968 [offset]	Mountaineering
26.972	Hobbyist comms
26.976 [offset]	Mountaineering
26.980	Highway comms
26.988	spare
26.996	spare
27.004	Radio-controlled model aircraft
27.012	Rural comms
27.020	Radio-controlled devices, ex. garage door openers, alarms
27.028	Rural comms
27.036	Hobbyist comms
27.044	Highway emergency (to contact police)
27.052	Highway emergency (to contact EMS)
27.060	Marine lifesaving comms
27.068	Marine lifesaving comms
27.076	Disaster relief
27.084	Disaster relief
27.092	Forestry
27.100	Forestry
27.108	Radio-controlled devices, ex. garage door openers, alarms
27.116	Radio-controlled model aircraft
27.124	Hobbyist comms
27.132	spare
27.140	Mountaineering
27.148	Radio-controlled model aircraft
27.155 [offset]	Radio-controlled models, general
27.156	Radio-controlled model aircraft
27.164	spare
27.172	Rural comms
27.180	spare
27.188	spare
27.196	spare
27.204	Mountaineering
27.212	Rural comms
27.220	Sports events
27.225 [offset]	Radio-controlled models, general
27.228	Radio-controlled model aircraft
27.236	Highway comms
27.244	Sports events
27.250 [offset]	Radio-controlled toys and gadgets
27.252	spare
27.260	Radio-controlled toys and gadgets
27.268	spare
27.276	spare

Updated 27 channel CB radio channel plan (with 5 R/C frequencies annotated):

India CB channels – updated CB radio band plan – 27 Channels
Frequency [MHz]	Channel Number
26.965	Channel 01
26.975	Channel 02
26.985	Channel 03
26.995	Radio-controlled models, general (no voice communications permitted) – "Channel 3A"
27.005	Channel 04
27.015	Channel 05
27.025	Channel 06
27.035	Channel 07
27.045	Radio-controlled models, general (no voice communications permitted) – "Channel 7A"
27.055	Channel 08
27.065	Channel 09
27.075	Channel 10
27.085	Channel 11
27.095	Radio-controlled models, general (no voice communications permitted) – "Channel 11A"
27.105	Channel 12
27.115	Channel 13
27.125	Channel 14
27.135	Channel 15
27.145	Radio-controlled models, general (no voice communications permitted) – "Channel 15A"
27.155	Channel 16
27.165	Channel 17
27.175	Channel 18
27.185	Channel 19
27.195	Radio-controlled models, general (no voice communications permitted) – "Channel 19A"
27.205	Channel 20
27.215	Channel 21
27.225	Channel 22
27.255	Channel 23 – shared with radio-controlled models.
27.235	Channel 24
27.245	Channel 25
27.265	Channel 26
27.275	Channel 27

== Popular use ==
Citizens Band radio is a good option for long-haul truck drivers to communicate directions, traffic problems and other relevant matters.

== Unlicensed communications ==
- Family Radio Service (FRS) UHF CB system used in the USA and Canada
- KDR 444
- LPD433
- UHF CB
- Citizens band radio
- Multi-Use Radio Service (MURS)
- Personal radio service
- General Mobile Radio Service (GMRS)
- Unlicensed Personal Communications Services

== See also ==
- Amateur radio
- Amateur radio in India
