= Bob Tanna =

Bhavsinh Moraji "Bob" Tanna (c. 1915 – 18 February 2011) was an Indian amateur radio operator who was instrumental in setting up the Congress Radio along with Nariman Printer on the request of Usha Mehta, an Indian National Congress party leader.

The Congress Radio helped broadcast messages to grass-root party workers across the country and began broadcasting from 2 September 1942 on 7.12 MHz. The station could be received as far as Japanese-occupied Burma.

By November 1942, Tanna was betrayed by an unknown radio officer, and was forced to shut down the station. He continued to work in radio well into his 90s.

== See also ==
- Nariman Printer
- Amateur radio in India
- Congress Radio
