= Hamfest India =

Annual Indian amateur radio event

Hamfest India is an annual amateur radio convention held in India since 1991. The event typically includes technical sessions, presentations, exhibitions, demonstrations, sales of radio equipment, and a flea market aimed at ham operators. It also seeks to promote interest in ham radio.

The venue for the next event is decided by the General Body of the previous event.

== History ==
A series of meetings organised by the All Kerala Amateur Radio Clubs' Coordination Committee in Kerala, lead to the idea of a yearly convention. In August 1991, a net featuring discussions on technical topics named Hinet was launched. (Note: The Net frequency was 7065 kHz, and the timing was 8 AM to 8.30 AM on all Sundays,)

The Hinet discussions lead to the idea of organizing a "Hamfest" where HAMs (Amateur Radio Operators) and SWLs (shortwave listeners) could meet and share ideas and techniques. The Kerala Amateur Radio Clubs Coordination Committee organized the first Hamfest on 28 and 29 December 1991 at Government Guest House, Kuttikkanam. The meeting had 38 participants.

== Host cities with Convenors ==
Host cities with Convenors
Year	Place	Convenor name	Convenor call sign
1991	Kuttikkanam	Joseph Mattappally	VU2JIM
1992	Aluva	K. N. Gopinadhan	VU2EGM
1993	Salem	Premchand K.	VU2RPC
1994	Mysore	K. R. Madhukar	VU2MUD
1995	Mumbai	Adolph Shephard	VU2AF
1996	Kolkata	Avinash Misra	VU2EM
1997	Kochi (Cochin)	S. Suresh	VU2SUO
1998	Bangalore	Ramachandra	VU2RCR
1999	Mysore	M. T. Kesari	VU2MTK
2000	Hyderabad	Chalam Chivukula	VU2CLM
2001	Nagpur	Shrikant Jichkar	VU2SJA
2002	Chennai	M. Saravanan	VU2MSS
2003	Gandhinagar	S. K. Nanda (Note: related to IAS)	SWL (Note: (no call sign))
2004	Mumbai	Nilesh Rathod	VU2NLF
2005	not held		
2006	Kollam	K. G. Nadarajan	VU2KGN
2007	Guntur	R. Sarath Babu	VU2RS
2008	Gandhinagar	Dr S. K. Nanda (Note: Secretary to Govt. of Gujarat)	SWL
2009	Bangaluru	M. R. Sampath Kumar	VU2YZ
2010	Pollachi	S. Vijayan	VU2WDP
2011	Kochi (Cochin)	K. G. Girish Babu	VU2KGB
2012	Chennai	K. M. Devadas	VU2DH
2013	Gwalior	Jayant Bide	VU2JAU
2014	Hyderabad	Ashaar Farhan	VU2ESE
2015	Rajkot	S, K. Nanda, I.A.S	SWL
2016	Mount Abu	Yeshwant Patil	VU3YOR
2017	Kolkata	Mohammad Ariff	VU2HRF
2018	Bangalore	Dr S. Sathyapal	VU2FI
2019	Kanyakumari	P. A. Kumarasamy Raja	VU2PAJ
2020	not held		
2021	not held		
2022	Mysore	Shankar Prasad	VU2SPK
2023	Ahmedabad	E. Radhakrishna	SWL
2024	Kolkata	Nilkantha Chatterjee	VU2OII
2025	Goa	Sandesh Bhat	VU22DX (ex VU3FGJ)
2026	Mangaluru	Pruthviraj U	VU33PU
