= Radio First Termer =

Vietnamese pirate radio station

- Saigon; South Vietnam
- Branding: Radio First Termer

Programming
- Language: English
- Format: Underground radio, hard rock, antiwar satire

Ownership
- Owner: Clyde David DeLay (unofficial/pirate)

History
- First air date: 1 January 1971
- Last air date: 21 January 1971

Radio First Termer was an underground pirate radio station that operated in January 1971 during the Vietnam War. The station was fronted by United States Air Force Sergeant Clyde David DeLay (August 15, 1948 — January 20, 2012), under the on-air pseudonym of "Dave Rabbit". The two other members of his crew were called "Pete Sadler" and "Nguyen."

After serving three tours in Vietnam, DeLay and his friends launched Radio First Termer from a secret studio located inside a Saigon brothel, with the format centered on "hard acid rock" from bands such as Steppenwolf, Bloodrock, Three Dog Night, Led Zeppelin, Sugarloaf, James Gang, and Iron Butterfly, who were popular among the troops but largely ignored by the American Forces Vietnam Network. The music was mixed with antiwar commentary, skits lampooning the Air Force and former President Lyndon B. Johnson, and explicit sexual and drug-oriented jokes. Radio First Termer broadcast for a total of 63 hours over 21 nights from January 1 to 21, 1971.

During the mid-1990s, sound clips from the station that were posted on the Internet renewed interest in the station. In 2006, DeLay went public with his broadcasting history, and was interviewed in a bonus feature on the DVD release of the 2005 documentary Sir! No Sir!. In February 2008, station clips were aired on Opie & Anthony.
