= Nariman Printer =

Nariman Aderbad Printer (fl. c. 1940) was an Indian amateur radio operator known for setting up the Congress Radio.

With the outbreak of World War II in 1939, the British cancelled the issue of new licences. All amateur radio operators were sent written orders hand over their transmitting equipment to the police, both for possible use in the war effort and to prevent the stations from being surreptitiously used by Axis collaborators and spies. With the Indian independence movement gaining momentum, Printer, in 1940 set up the Azad Hind Radio to broadcast Gandhian protest music and uncensored economic news. He was promptly arrested and his equipment seized. In August 1942, after Mahatma Gandhi launched the Quit India Movement, the British began clamping down on Indian freedom fighters and censoring the media. To circumvent media restrictions, Indian National Congress activists, led by Usha Mehta contacted Mumbai-based amateur radio operators, "Bob" Tanna (VU2LK) and Printer to help broadcast messages to grass-root party workers across the country. This became known as the "Congress Radio", and began broadcasting from 2 September 1942 on 7.12 MHz. The station could be received as far as Japanese occupied Burma. By November 1942, Printer was caught and decided to help the British.

Printer is remembered for his call sign VU2FU.
