= Amateur Radio Society of India =

Indian amateur radio organization

- Abbreviation: ARSI
- Formation: 1954-05-15
- Type: Non-profit organization
- Purpose: Advocacy, Education, Liaison
- Headquarters: Bangalore, Karnataka; MK82tx
- Region served: India
- Members: 848
- Official language: English
- President: Ramesh Kumar (VU2LU)
- Main organ: Governing Council
- Affiliations: International Amateur Radio Union
- Website: www.arsi.info

The Amateur Radio Society of India (ARSI) is a national non-profit organization for amateur radio enthusiasts in India. ARSI is recognized by the Indian government under the provisions of Section 13 of the Indian Societies Registration Act (No. XXI of 1860) as amended and extended.

== Overview ==
ARSI operates a QSL bureau for those amateur radio operators in regular contact with amateur radio operators in other countries, and supports amateur radio operating awards and radio contests. The Amateur Radio Society of India represents the interests of Indian amateur radio operators before national and international regulatory authorities. ARSI is the national member society representing India in the International Amateur Radio Union.

== Expeditions ==
The Amateur Radio Society of India has been instrumental in leading amateur radio DX-peditions to the remote island territories of India in the Indian Ocean. ARSI organised an amateur radio DX-pedition to Lakshadweep in December, 2006 with the callsign VU7LD. A second ARSI expedition was carried out from Andaman in 2011 operating from Port Blair with the callsign VU4PB. Many ARSI members have also operated from smaller islands in the Arabian Sea and Bay of Bengal as part of the Radio Society of Great Britain's Islands On The Air IOTA programme.
