= Ae Watan Mere Watan =

2024 Indian film by Kannan lyer

- Official release poster
- Directed by: Kannan Iyer
- Written by: Darab Farooqui; Kannan Iyer
- Produced by: Karan Johar; Apoorva Mehta; Somen Mishra
- Starring: Sara Ali Khan; Alexx O'Nell; Emraan Hashmi
- Cinematography: Amalendu Chaudhary
- Edited by: Sangeeth Varghese
- Music by: Mukund Suryawanshi; Akashdeep Sengupta; Shashi Suman
- Production company: Dharmatic Entertainment
- Distributed by: Amazon Prime Video
- Release date: 21 March 2024
- Running time: 133 minutes
- Country: India
- Language: Hindi

Ae Watan Mere Watan (transl. Oh Country My Country) is a 2024 Hindi-language historical biographical film written and directed by Kannan Iyer, based on India's struggle for Independence in 1942, and the life of Usha Mehta, a brave young girl who starts an underground radio station to spread the message of unity, setting off a thrilling chase with the British authorities during the Quit India movement. It is produced by Karan Johar, Apoorva Mehta, and Somen Mishra under Dharmatic Entertainment. The film stars Sara Ali Khan, Alexx O'Nell and Emraan Hashmi. The film premiered on 21 March 2024 on Amazon Prime Video to mixed reviews from critics.

== Plot ==
In 1930, a young Usha Mehta witnesses her Gandhian schoolteacher being brutally beaten by British police during a protest. The fearless child tries to intervene, getting injured herself. Her father, Hariprasad, a loyal British-serving judge, locks her in a room to suppress her rebellious spirit but also introduces her to the radio as a window to the world.

By 1942, during World War II, 22-year-old Usha (Sara Ali Khan) in Bombay is secretly deeply involved in India's freedom struggle, unbeknownst to her father. Leading a small group of young revolutionaries—including her love interest Kaushik (Abhay Verma), close friend Fahad (Sparsh Srivastav), and others—she joins the Congress party's Quit India Movement launched by Gandhi.

Inspired after meeting Gandhi, Usha takes a vow of celibacy (brahmacharya), upsetting Kaushik but not deterring him from the fight. When the British ban Congress, arrest its leaders, and suppress all communication, Usha conceives a bold plan: an underground clandestine radio station, "Congress Radio," broadcasting on frequency 42.34 every night at 8:30 p.m.

With help from her grand-aunt's gold jewelry (sold to fund the expensive transmitter) and engineer Firdaus, Usha, Kaushik, and Fahad begin broadcasting recorded messages from jailed Congress leaders. The broadcasts spread rapidly, reaching from Mangalore to Ajmer and gaining attention from socialist leader Ram Manohar Lohia (Emraan Hashmi). Lohia later collaborates with them, upgrading the setup to make Congress Radio a powerful nationwide voice that reignites the flagging Quit India Movement.

As the broadcasts become a major threat, British intelligence officer John Lyre is tasked with tracking the operators. Using triangulation and American detection technology, the police close in. Several comrades are arrested or abandon the cause; Kaushik briefly leaves, unable to watch Usha risk her life; and tragic sacrifices occur, including the death of their leader Balbir.

In a final act of defiance on Diwali, Usha and a reconciled Kaushik broadcast Lohia's crucial revolutionary message calling for nationwide uprising. They delay the police long enough for the declaration to air. The couple is arrested as "Vande Mataram" plays. Under torture, Kaushik breaks and implicates Lohia, while Usha remains steadfast.

Usha is sentenced to four years in prison. Her estranged father, moved by her courage and a visit from Lohia, finally renounces his British loyalties and writes her a proud apology. Upon her release, Usha is greeted by 20,000 admirers as a living symbol of revolution.

The film is a fictionalized tribute to the real-life Usha Mehta and the historic Congress Radio that operated secretly for nearly three months in 1942, keeping the Quit India flame alive against overwhelming odds.

== Cast ==
- Sara Ali Khan as Usha Mehta
- Alexx O'Nell as John Lyre
- Anand Tiwari as Firdaus Engineer
- Sachin Khedekar as Judge Hariprasad Mehta, Usha's father
- Abhay Verma as Kaushik
- Sparsh Srivastav as Fahad
- Benedict Garrett as Corrigan
- Richard Bhakti Klein as Viceroy Linlithgow
- Ashton Bessette as Cameron
- Rick McLane as Grant
- Ed Robinson as Captain Wily
- Godaan Kumar as Balbir
- Uday Chandra as Mahatma Gandhi
- Annuop Choudhari as Gaonkar
- Aditi Sanwal as Antara
- Pratik Yadav as Bhaskar
- Chrisann Pereira as Julie
- Siddharth Gollapudi as Shinde
- Sanjeev Jaiswal as Alok
- Emraan Hashmi as Ram Manohar Lohia
- Garrvil Mohan as Lieutenant Roy

== Production ==
Principal photography commenced in October 2022 and first schedule ended in December. The second schedule began by April 2023 and the film wrapped up in May 2023.

== Soundtrack ==
Ae Watan Mere Watan

Soundtrack album by Mukund Suryawanshi, Akashdeep Sengupta and Shashi Suman
- Released: 9 March 2024
- Recorded: 2022
- Genre: Feature film soundtrack
- Length: 23:52
- Language: Hindi
- Label: T-Series

Official audio
- Ae Watan Mere Watan (Full Album on YouTube

The music of the film was composed by Mukund Suryawanshi, Akashdeep Sengupta and Shashi Suman while lyrics were written by Suryawanshi, Ravi Girri, Rohan Deshmukh, Darab Farooqui and Prashant Ingole.

Track listing
No.	Title	Lyrics	Music	Singer(s)	Length
1.	"Qatra Qatra"	Mukund Suryawanshi, Ravi Girri, Rohan Deshmukh	Mukund Suryawanshi	Sukhwinder Singh	5:11
2.	"Ae Watan Mere Watan - Title Track"	Darab Farooqui	Akashdeep Sengupta	Romy	4:53
3.	"Julia"	Prashant Ingole	Shashi Suman	Divya Kumar, Shashi	3:21
4.	"Dua E Azaadi"	Darab Farooqui	Shashi Suman	Javed Ali, Swaroop Khan, Shashi	6:17
5.	"Ae Watan Mere Watan - Title Track" (Female Version)	Darab Farooqui	Akashdeep Sengupta	Neeti Mohan	4:10
Total length:					23:52

== Reception ==
=== Critical response ===
Ae Watan Mere Watan wasn't well received by critics.

A critic from Bollywood Hungama gave 3 out of 5 stars and wrote "Ae Watan Mere Watan is worth watching as it presents an untold chapter of Indian history." Sukanya Verma of Rediff.com gave 3/5 stars and observed "Ae Watan Mere Watan tries to get a grasp on the mind of youngsters, shaped by the words of inspiring leaders, committed to the cause of independent India. It's significant because their support isn't based on 'andh bhakti' (blind devotion), but leadership that encourages questions".

NDTV's Saibal Chatterjee rated the film 2.5 out of 5, opining in his review that, "Ae Watan Mere Watan makes its points with clarity and directness. It tells a tale that has meat, but the storytelling style that the film adopts stops it significantly short of being either consistently riveting or memorably rousing". He criticized the lead performance, opining that, "Sara Ali Khan, playing the principal character, is way too porcelain and dainty to convey the remarkably doughty woman's fierce determination." Zinia Bandyopadhyay of India Today gave 2/5 stars and wrote that "Ae Watan Mere Watan drowns in a lacklustre script despite having the potential to be an effective story."

Firstpost's Lachmi Deb Roy, in her review, rated the film 2/5 and said that "Though the film was able to weave the freedom movement with enough human stories showing Usha’s contribution to the Quit India movement, but Ae Watan Mere Watan was unable to give us those goosebumps which a freedom movie generally does". Shubhra Gupta of Indian Express called the film a "banal blur". She panned the film, opining that "nothing about this period drama breaks out of familiar moulds" and that "Sara Ali Khan leaves little impact." However, she called Sparsh Srivastav the "breakout star", praising his performance as a polio-afflicted young freedom fighter.
