= Call signs in India =

Call signs in India are unique identifiers for telecommunications and broadcasting in India. The Ministry of Communications and Information Technology regulates call signs nationally, and the International Telecommunication Union regulates call signs internationally.

== Call sign blocks ==
The International Telecommunication Union has assigned India the following call signs:

Callsign	CQ	ITU
8TA to 8YZ	22	41
VTA to VWZ	22	41
ATA to AWZ	22	41

Note: The Andaman and Nicobar Islands come under ITU Zone 49 and CQ Zone 26.

In addition to the above, the base of Maitri and the abandoned station of Dakshin Gangotri, also use the Indian callsigns but come under ITU Zone 67 and CQ Zone 38 respectively.

== Defunct callsigns ==
- CR8 – Portuguese India
- FN8 – French India
- AC3 – the former monarchy of Sikkim, now a state of India

== Call signs ==
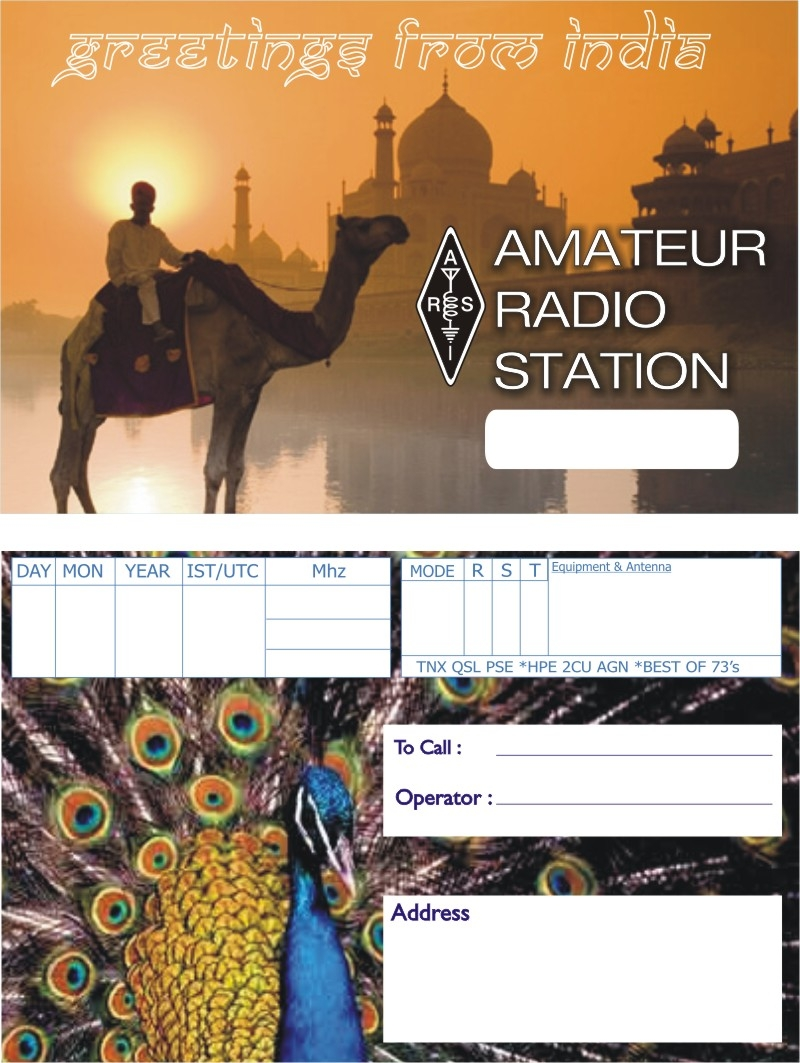
The generic QSL card created by ARSI for amateur radio operators in India

The International Telecommunication Union (ITU) has divided all countries into three regions; India is located in ITU Region 3. These regions are further divided into two competing zones, the ITU and the CQ. Mainland India and the Lakshadweep Islands come under ITU Zone 41 and CQ Zone 22, and the Andaman and Nicobar Islands under ITU Zone 49 and CQ Zone 26. The ITU has assigned to India call-sign blocks 8TA to 8YZ, VTA to VWZ, and ATA to AWZ. The WPC allots the individual call-signs, or call sign series.

Call-sign	Description
2**	Callsigns used by early amateur radio operators before 1928. They were later converted to the VU series. (defunct)
AT0	AT0A – Antarctic expedition to Dakshin Gangotri in 1983
AT*JCB	AT0JCB to AT9JCB – Special callsign allotted to mark the birth centenary of radio scientist Jagadish Chandra Bose in November/December 2007. See also AU*JCB.
AT3	AT3D – Special callsign for an Antarctic expedition for a 1994-1996 expedition to Antarctica.; AT3ANT – Special callsign for the 3rd and 5th Antarctic Activity Week.
AT6	AT6MM – Mahamastabhishekha Celebrations 2006 Special Event Amateur Radio Station
AT7	AT7CD – Bangalore Amateur Radio Club VU2ARC National Disaster Reduction Day; AT7LEO – Special Event Station at Tirupathi, Andhra Pradesh
AT8	AT8LH – Mahaballipuram Amateur Radio Light House Operation International LightHouse and LightShip Week; AT8LHC – Kadalur Point Lighthouse - Kerala - ILLW 2009 on occasion of Centenary Celebrations; AT8ESP – 5th Asian Congress of Esperanto Special Event Amateur (Ham) Radio Station, Bangalore; AT8WWF – India's First Flora and Fauna Amateur Radio Activity at Bannerhatta National Park
ATA	Time signal broadcast by the National Physical Laboratory of India at New Delhi; Antarctic expeditions
ATN	Antarctic expeditions
AU*JSB	AU0JCB to AU9JCB – Special callsign allotted to mark the birth centenary of radio scientist Jagadish Chandra Bose in November/December 2007. See also AT*JCB.
AU2BSG	Special Call Sign allotted for India's Second Scout Camp on the AIR (SCOTA) during 22–25 May 2015 at VU2HEN, Calvary Mount, Idukki, Kerala State, India.
VT	(Aircraft)
VU0	Special call sign to celebrate the birth centenary of Mahatma Gandhi in 1969
VU2/VU22-VU29	General grade (Previously Grade I and Advanced Grade callsigns)
VU3/ VU33-VU39	Restricted grade (Previously Grade II and Grade II restricted callsigns) e.g.:VU3EGH, VU3UNE
VU4	Used by stations in the Andaman and Nicobar Islands.
VU5	Callsigns used by the erstwhile Maharaja of Mysore and Indian Railways HF transmitters in pre-independence India.; Callsign used by a 1960 DX-pedition to the Andaman Islands
VU6	Special callsign used by a broadcast station in pre-independence India
VU7	Used by stations in the Lakshadweep Islands.
VW	(Marine vessels)
CR8	Portuguese India (defunct)
AC3	Former monarchy of Sikkim (defunct)
FN8	French India (defunct)

=== Assignments for amateur radio ===
Amateur radio or ham radio is practised by more than 16,000 licensed users. The first amateur radio operator was licensed in 1921, and by the mid-1930s, there were around 20 amateur radio operators in India. Amateur radio operators have played an important part in the Indian independence movement with the establishment of pro-independence radio stations in the 1940s, which were illegal. The Wireless and Planning and Coordination Wing (WPC), a division of the Ministry of Communications and Information Technology, regulates amateur radio in India. The WPC assigns call signs, issues amateur radio licences, conducts exams, allots frequency spectrum, and monitors the radio waves.

== See also ==
- Amateur radio in India
- Amateur Station Operator's Certificate
- Hamfest Celebrations in India
