= Indian Wireless Telegraph (Amateur Service) Rules, 1978 =

Act regarding use of amateur radio in India

The Indian Wireless Telegraphs (Amateur Service) Rules, 1978 is an act that governs amateur radio services in India. The Act covers the syllabus, rules and regulations and contains the various forms necessary to obtain a licence and handling equipment. The act is a sub part of Indian Wireless Telegraph Rules.
