= Kannan Iyer =

Indian film writer and actor

- Occupations: director, writer, actor
- Years active: 1997 – present

Kannan Iyer is an Indian filmmaker and actor. He has written films like Daud (1997) and Victory (2009); and has also directed a supernatural thriller, Ek Thi Daayan, starring Emraan Hashmi, Konkona Sen Sharma and Huma Qureshi. The film got positive reviews from the critics and was declared a box office hit. His next directorial feature, Ae Watan Mere Watan was released in 2024.

In 2023, Kannan Iyer co-authored a fantasy novel titled 'The Pledge', along with Madhulika Liddle, inspired by a story by Amit Bolakani. This was published by Speaking Tiger Books.

== Filmography ==
Year	Film	Language	Notes
2013	Ek Thi Daayan	Hindi	Directorial debut
2024	Ae Watan Mere Watan	Hindi	
