= Usha Mehta =

Indian independence activist

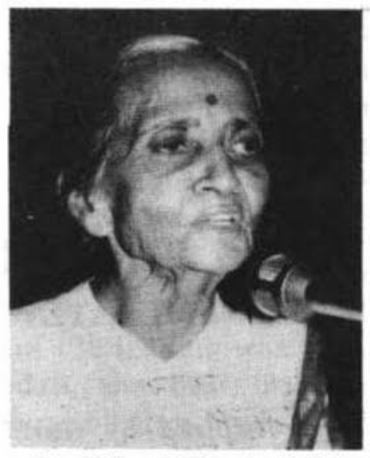
- Mehta in 1996
- Born: 25 March 1920; Saras, Bombay Presidency, British India (present day Surat, Gujarat, India)
- Died: 11 August 2000 (aged 80); Mumbai, Maharashtra, India
- Occupations: Activist; Professor
- Employers: Wilson College, Mumbai (till 1980); Gandhi Peace Foundation
- Known for: Gandhian and political activist of India
- Awards: Padma Vibhushan (1998)

Usha Mehta (25 March 1920 – 11 August 2000) was a Gandhian and independence activist of India. She is also remembered for organizing the Congress Radio, also called the Secret Congress Radio, an underground radio station, which functioned for a few months during the Quit India Movement of 1942. In 1998, the Government of India conferred on her Padma Vibhushan, the second highest civilian award of the Republic of India.

== Early life ==
Usha Mehta was born in Saras, a village near Surat in modern-day Gujarat. When she was just five years old, Usha first saw Gandhi while on a visit to his ashram at Ahmedabad. Shortly afterwards, Gandhi arranged a camp near her village in which little Usha participated, attending sessions and doing a little spinning.

In 1928, eight-year-old Usha participated in a protest march against the Simon Commission and shouted her first words of protest against the British Raj: "Simon Go Back." She and other children participated in early morning protests against the British Raj and picketing in front of liquor shops. During one of these protests marches, the policemen charged the children, and a girl carrying the Indian flag fell down along with the flag. Angry at this incident, the children took the story to their parents. The elders responded by dressing up the children in the colours of the Indian flag and sending them out in the streets a few days later. Dressed in the colours of the flag, the children marched again, shouting: "Policemen, you can wield your sticks and your batons, but you cannot bring down our flag."

Usha's father was a judge under the British Raj. He therefore did not encourage her to participate in the freedom struggle. However, this limitation was removed when her father retired in 1930. In 1932, when Usha was 12, her family moved to Bombay, making it possible for her to participate more actively in the freedom movement. She and other children distributed clandestine bulletins and publications, visited relatives in the prisons, and carried messages to these prisoners.

Usha grew up highly influenced by Gandhi and became one of his followers. She made an early decision to remain celibate for life and took up a spartan, Gandhian lifestyle, wearing only Khādī clothes and keeping away from luxuries of all types. Over time, she emerged as a prominent proponent of Gandhian thought and philosophy.

Usha's initial schooling was in Kheda and Bharuch and then in Chandaramji High School, Bombay. She was an average student. In 1935, her matriculation examinations placed her among the top 25 students in her class. She continued her education at Wilson College, Bombay, graduating in 1939 with a first-class degree in philosophy. She also began studying law, but ended her studies in 1942 to join the Quit India Movement. Thereafter, beginning at age 22, she participated in the freedom movement full-time.

== Role in freedom struggle ==
Gandhi and the Congress had announced that the Quit India Movement would commence on 9 August 1942 with a rally at Gowalia Tank grounds in Mumbai. Nearly all leaders including Gandhi were arrested before that date. However, a vast crowd of Indians gathered at Gowalia Tank Ground on the appointed day. It was left to a group of junior leaders and workers to address them and hoist the national flag.

On 14 August 1942, Usha and some of her close associates began the Secret Congress Radio, a clandestine radio station. It went air on 27 August. The first words broadcast in her voice were: "This is the Congress radio calling on [a wavelength of] 42.34 meters from somewhere in India." Her associates included Vithalbhai Jhaveri, Chandrakant Jhaveri, Babubhai Thakkar and Nanka Motwani, owner of Chicago Radio, who supplied equipment and provided technicians. Many other leaders, including Dr. Ram Manohar Lohia, Achyutrao Patwardhan and Purushottam Trikamdas, also assisted the Secret Congress Radio. The radio broadcast recorded messages from Gandhi and other prominent leaders across India. To elude the authorities, the organizers moved the station's location almost daily. Ultimately, however, the police found them on 12 November 1942 and arrested the organizers, including Usha Mehta. All were later imprisoned.

The Criminal Investigation Department (CID), a wing of the Indian Police, interrogated her for six months. During this time, she was held in solitary confinement and offered inducements such as the opportunity to study abroad if she would betray the movement. However, she chose to remain silent and, during her trials, asked the Judge of the High Court whether she was required to answer the questions. When the judge confirmed that she was not mandatory, she declared that she would not reply to any of the questions, not even to save herself. After the trial, she was sentenced to four years' imprisonment (1942 to 1946). Two of her associates were also convicted. Usha was imprisoned at Yerwada Jail in Pune. Her health deteriorated and she was sent to Bombay for treatment at Sir J. J. Hospital. In the hospital, three to four policemen kept a round-the-clock watch on her to prevent her from escaping. When her health improved, she was returned to Yerwada Jail. In March 1946, she was released, the first political prisoner to be released in Bombay, at the orders of Morarji Desai, who was at that time the home minister in the interim government.

Although the Secret Congress Radio functioned only for three months, it greatly assisted the movement by disseminating uncensored news and other information banned by the British-controlled government of India. Secret Congress Radio also kept the leaders of the freedom movement in touch with the public. Reminiscing about those days, Usha Mehta described her involvement with the Secret Congress Radio as her "finest moment" and also as her saddest moment, because an Indian technician had betrayed them to the authorities.

== Post-independence ==
After her incarceration, Usha's failing health prevented her from participating in politics or social work. The day India gained independence, Usha Mehta was confined to bed and could not attend the official function in New Delhi. She later re-commenced her education and wrote a doctoral dissertation on the political and social thought of Gandhi, earning a PhD from the University of Bombay. She had a long association with Mumbai university in many capacities: as a student, as a research assistant, as a lecturer, a professor, and finally as the head of the department of civics and politics. She retired from the University of Bombay in 1980.

Even after India's independence, Usha continued to be socially active, particularly in spreading the Gandhian thought and philosophy. Over the years, she authored many articles, essays, and books in English and Gujarati, her mother tongue. She was elected the president of Gandhi Smarak Nidhi, a trust dedicated to the preservation of Gandhian heritage. The Nidhi acquired Mani Bhavan in Mumbai, residence of Sardar Patel's daughter Manibehn Patel, where Gandhi used to reside during his visits to the city and converted it into a Gandhi memorial. She was the president of Gandhi Peace Foundation, New Delhi. She also actively participated in the affairs of Bharatiya Vidya Bhavan. The Government of India associated her with a number of celebrations of India's 50th anniversary of freedom.

The Republic of India conferred on her Padma Vibhushan in 1998, the second highest civilian award of India.

== Later years ==
With time, Usha grew increasingly unhappy with the developments taking place in the social, political, and economic spheres of independent India. Once, in an interview to India Today, she expressed her feelings in these words: "Certainly this is not the freedom we fought for." She added that the freedom fighters of her generation felt that "once people were ensconced in positions of power, the rot would set in." However, in her words, "we didn't know the rot would sink in so soon." Nevertheless, she did not deny the achievements of free India since the independence: "India has survived as a democracy and even built a good industrial base," she said. "Still, it is not the India of our dreams".

In August 2000, although she was suffering from fever, Usha participated like she did every year in the anniversary celebrations related to the Quit India Movement in August Kranti Maidan. She returned home weak and exhausted. Two days later, she died peacefully on 11 August 2000 at the age of 80, surrounded by her elder brother and three nephews. One of her nephews is Ketan Mehta, a noted Bollywood filmmaker. The other nephew is Dr Yatin Mehta, a well-known anaesthetist who was formerly the Director of Escorts Hospital and is associated with Medicity in Gurgaon now. The third nephew is Dr Nirad Mehta, who joined the Army and is now at P.D. Hinduja National Hospital, Mumbai.

== In popular culture ==
=== Ae Watan Mere Watan ===
Ae Watan Mere Watan (transl. Oh Country My Country) is a 2024 Hindi-language historical biographical film about India's struggle for freedom in 1942, based on the life of Usha Mehta, a brave young girl who starts an underground radio station to spread the message of unity, setting off a thrilling chase with the British authorities during the Quit India movement. It is written and directed by Kannan Iyer and produced by Karan Johar, starring Sara Ali Khan, Alexx O'Nell and Emraan Hashmi. The film premiered on 21 March 2024 on Amazon Prime Video to mixed reviews from critics.

== See also ==
- Indian independence movement
- Ae Watan Mere Watan, a 2024 Indian biopic on her efforts in running the Congress Radio
