= K-5 truck =

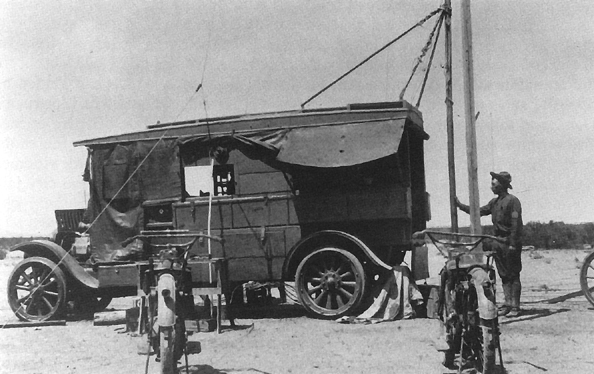
radio tractor no.3

The K-5 truck is a light automobile truck with a 10 feet 4 inches (3.15 m) wheelbase, standard automobile gauge, and 35 in (89 cm) wheels; length from front of radiator to rear of body 15 feet (4.57 m); equipped with single top; formerly marked with the Signal Corps emblem and the words "Signal Corps, U.S. Army" and also with the name "Maintenance truck No.5" or "Tender for radio tractor No.3" .

== See also ==
- List of Signal Corps Vehicles
- K-1 wire cart
- K-2 Lance wagon
- K-3 wire cart
- K-4 signal cart
- K-8 cart
- Radio tractor
