= Weather balloon =

High-altitude balloon to which meteorological instruments are attached

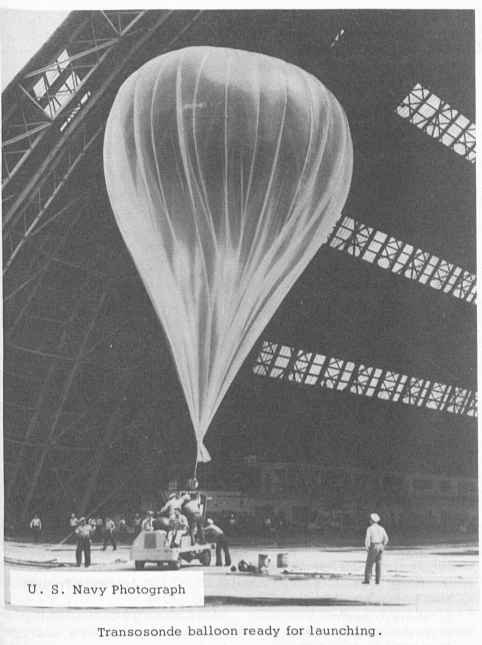
A weather balloon in preparation for launch

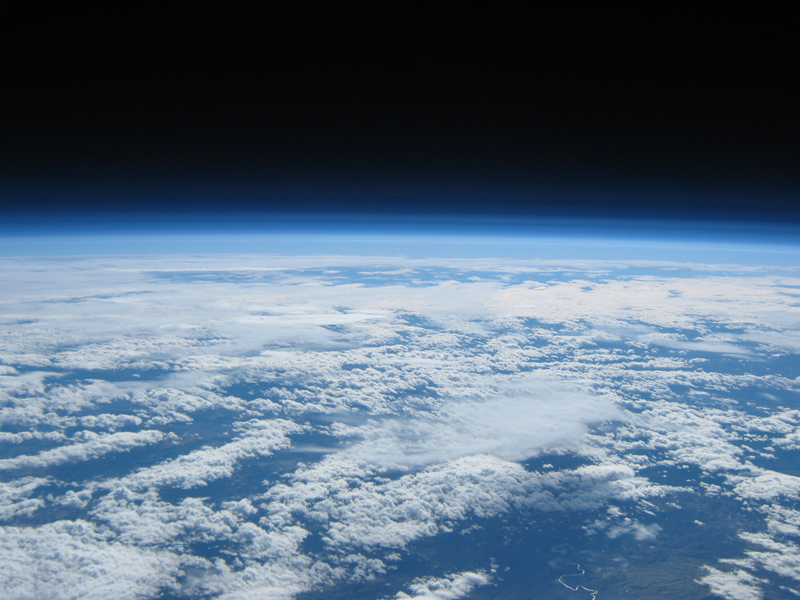
Picture taken at approximately 30 km above Oregon using a 1,500 gram weather balloon

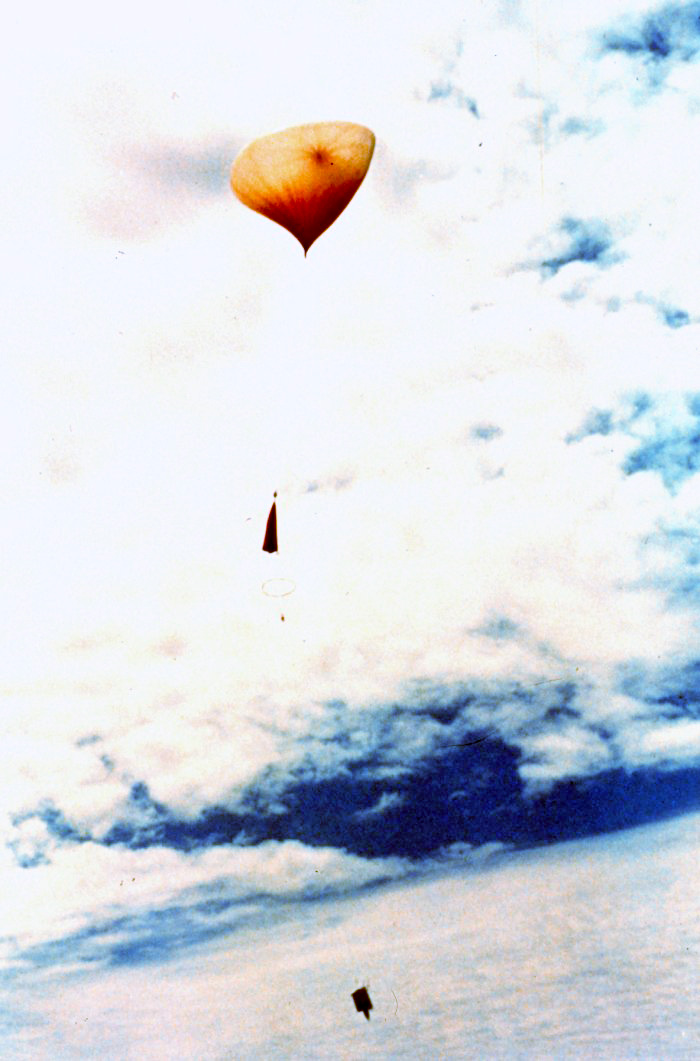
Rawinsonde weather balloon just after launch. Notice a parachute in the center of the string and a small instrument box at the end. After release it measures many parameters. These include temperature, relative humidity, pressure, and wind speed and direction. This information is transmitted back to surface observers.

A weather balloon, also known as a sounding balloon, is a high-altitude balloon (HAB) that carries instruments into the stratosphere for measuring atmospheric pressure, temperature, humidity and wind speed by means of a small, expendable measuring device called a radiosonde. First invented in the late 19th century, weather balloons have undergone several remodels and are still used by researchers across Europe, North America, and Asia to this day. The balloon itself is made of latex and filled with either helium or hydrogen to produce lift. Balloons can be tracked by radar, RDF, or GPS. Balloons meant to stay at a constant altitude for long periods are known as transosondes. Weather balloons that do not carry an instrument pack are used to determine upper-level winds and the height of cloud layers. For such balloons, a theodolite or total station is used to track the balloon's azimuth and elevation, which are then converted to estimated wind speed and direction and/or cloud height, as applicable.

Weather balloons are launched around the world for observations used to diagnose current conditions as well as by human forecasters and computer models for weather forecasting. Between 900 and 1,300 locations around the globe do routine releases, typically two or four times daily. Other uses for weather balloons consist of supplements for satellite readings, support for rocket launches, and other miscellaneous recordings.

The effectiveness of weather balloons is limited by their lack of coverage in some countries, as well as other atmospheric and instrumental factors. Environmental concerns have been raised over the frequent use of weather balloons, as the United States releases around 76,600 balloons annually. Many of these balloons end up in the ocean, up to 300 balloons per week, polluting the water and endangering the surrounding marine life.

== History ==
One of the first people to use weather balloons was the French meteorologist Léon Teisserenc de Bort. Starting in 1896 he launched hundreds of weather balloons from his observatory in Trappes, France. These experiments led to his discovery of the tropopause and stratosphere. These early weather balloons carried self-recording instruments that would be recovered upon landing, allowing researchers to atmospheric profiles from higher than ever before.

During the early 20th century, weather balloons expanded to broader upper-atmosphere research, investigating ozone, cosmic rays, and stratospheric circulation. Weather balloon observatories were established worldwide across Europe, North America, and Asia. The technology advanced even further in the 1920s through the invention of radiosondes, instruments which could relay real-time measurements of temperature, pressure, and humidity through radio signals. This innovation allowed the establishment of coordinated global sounding networks that are essential to weather forecasting and climate research today.

Transosondes, weather balloons with instrumentation meant to stay at a constant altitude for long periods of time to help diagnose radioactive debris from atomic fallout, were experimented with in 1958. The drone technology boom has led to the development of weather drones since the late 1990s. These drones offered the potential for precise, targeted measurements in areas and weather that would be impossible for balloons. These may begin to replace balloons as a more specific means for carrying radiosondes.

== Materials and equipment ==
The balloon itself produces the lift, and is usually made of a highly flexible latex material, though chloroprene may also be used. The unit that performs the actual measurements and radio transmissions hangs at the lower end of the string, and is called a radiosonde. Specialized radiosondes are used for measuring particular parameters, such as determining the ozone concentration.

To improve data quality, sensor exposure and airflow must be given special attention. Radiation shields are used to minimize overheating sensors. Recent research concludes that controlling the ascent and descent rates of the balloon can reduce wind related disturbances to sensors, providing more accurate measurements. To allow smoother descent, some balloons use dual-balloon configurations or valve-controlled balloons for better data collection on the way down.

The balloon is usually filled with hydrogen, though helium – a more expensive, but viable option nonetheless – is also frequently used. The ascent rate can be controlled by the amount of gas with which the balloon is filled, usually at around 300 metres per minute (980 ft/min). Weather balloons may reach altitudes of 40 km (25 mi) or more, limited by diminishing pressures causing the balloon to expand to such a degree (typically by a 100:1 factor) that it disintegrates. In this instance the instrument package is usually lost, although a parachute may be employed to help in allowing retrieval of the instrument. Above that altitude sounding rockets are used to carry instruments aloft, and for even higher altitudes satellites are used.

== Launch time, location, and uses ==
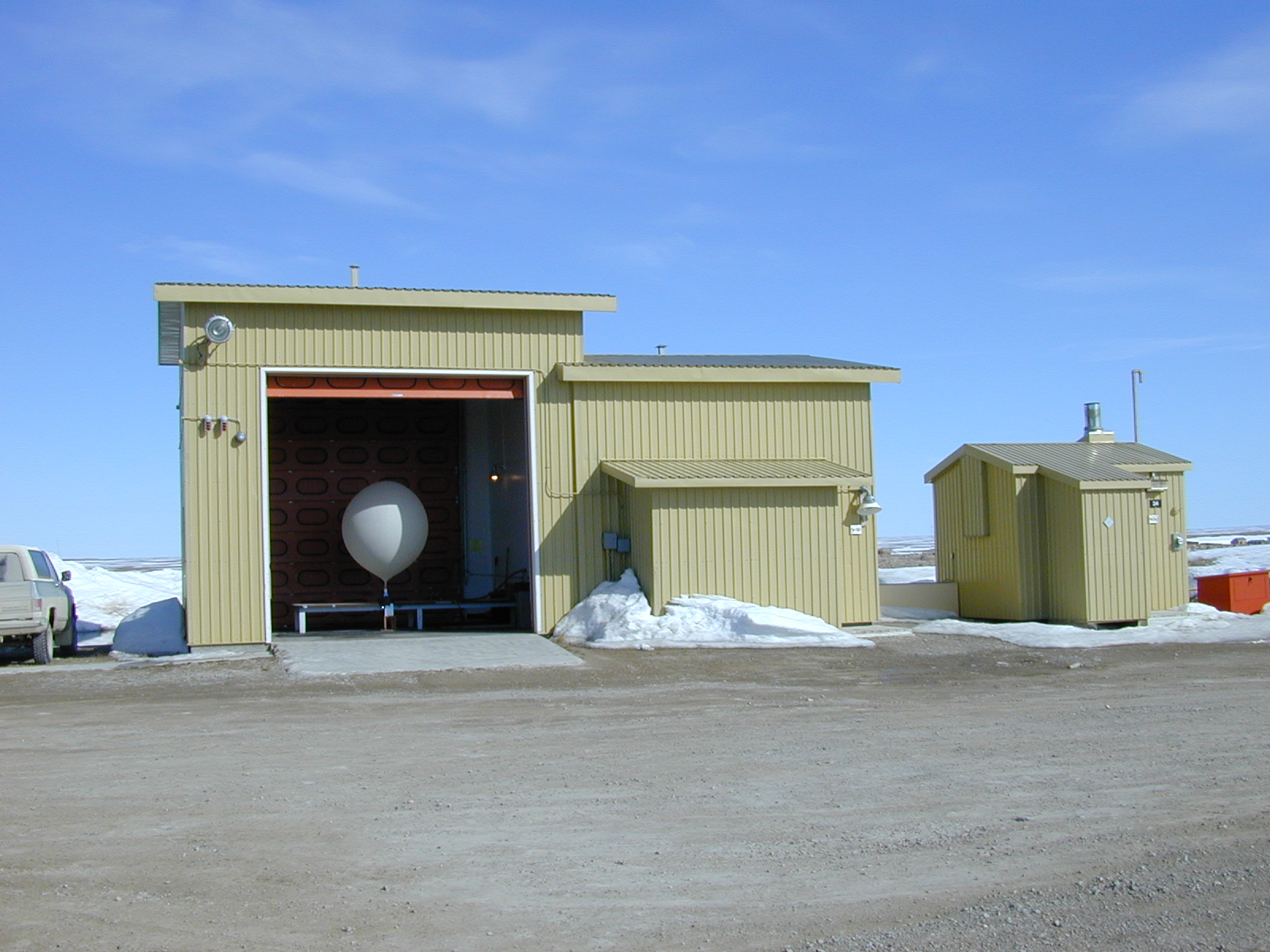
A hydrogen filled balloon at Cambridge Bay Upper Air station, Nunavut, Canada

Launch of wiki payload into stratosphere

Weather balloons are launched around the world for observations used to diagnose current conditions as well as by human forecasters and computer models for weather forecasting. Between 900 and 1,300 locations around the globe do routine releases, two or four times daily, usually at 0000 UTC and 1200 UTC. Some facilities will also do occasional supplementary special releases when meteorologists determine there is a need for additional data between the 12-hour routine launches in which time much can change in the atmosphere. Military and civilian government meteorological agencies such as the National Weather Service in the US typically launch balloons, and by international agreements, almost all the data are shared with all nations.

=== Weather balloons and satellites as complementary systems ===
Although satellites allow for global atmospheric coverage, their measurements have coarser resolution and can be affected by things like cloud cover, surface emissivity, and calibration drift. Weather balloons offer direct, in situ measurements of the temperature, pressure, and humidity in a region which helps identify errors in satellite retrievals and improve accuracy of data. For this reason, satellite measurements and weather balloon observations are often used side by side in modern climate monitoring systems.

=== Aerospace and rocket launch support ===
Weather balloons are also used as atmospheric sounding systems to assist with rocket launches. In a test performed by the Lukasiewicz Research Network - Institute of Aviation a balloon sounding system was used to assist the ILR-33 Amber sub-orbital rocket. In a series of test launches in 2019, the system acquired atmospheric data such as information on vertical wind profile in real time that was used in pre-launch procedures for the rocket.

=== Special uses ===
Specialized uses also exist, such as for aviation interests, pollution monitoring, photography or videography, and research. Examples include pilot balloons (Pibal). Field research programs often use mobile launchers from land vehicles as well as ships and aircraft (usually dropsondes in this case). In recent years, weather balloons have also been used for scattering human ashes at high altitudes. The weather balloon was also used to create the fictional entity 'Rover' during the production of the 1960s TV series The Prisoner in Portmeirion, Gwynedd, North Wales, UK in September 1966. This was retained in further scenes shot at MGM Borehamwood UK during 1966–67. Weather balloons have also been adapted as drifting platforms in chemistry and air quality research. Instead of ascending rapidly through the air, these systems are designed to drift with air masses, measuring trace gases, aerosols, and other chemical constituents in the lower troposphere. These balloons are useful in pollution research to examine transport, mixing, and chemical transformation of pollutants along moving air parcels. High altitude weather balloons can be used as research platforms for near-space studies, reaching a height of approximately 25-30 km where environmental conditions including intense ultraviolet levels, low temperature and atmospheric pressure. In a recent study, researchers launched a weather balloon carrying live microorganisms to investigate how exposure to these conditions affected cell survivability. These missions provide a cheaper alternative to orbital spaceflight experiments.

== Potential issues ==
=== Aviation ===
In 1970, an Antonov 24 operating Aeroflot Flight 1661 suffered a loss of control after striking a radiosonde in flight, resulting in the death of all 45 people on board.

On 16 October 2025, a United Airlines flight collided with a weather balloon at cruising altitude over Utah, fracturing its windshield, releasing shards of glass into the cockpit that injured the captain's right arm, and causing an emergency descent and diversion. The NTSB has begun an investigation, and the company behind the weather balloon has taken measures to reduce future risk.

There are also other ways in which weather balloons can pose a danger to aircraft, such as interfering with the pitot-static systems.

=== Coverage and observational gaps ===
Regions such as Africa, South America, the Southern Ocean, and the Antarctic are particularly underrepresented for weather balloon observations. This can lead to significant data gaps and skews in climate information, limiting understanding of the Southern Hemisphere's climate and atmospheric profile. This imbalance in coverage can be attributed to the steep price of weather balloon launches, (costing around 500 USD per launch), limiting access to third-world countries and limiting numbers worldwide.

=== Operational and instrumental constraints ===
Weather balloon performance is greatly influenced by lifting gas volume and payload mass, as well as weather conditions. The launch site and user experience can affect mission success as well, making it hard to get consistent results. The completeness of upper-air observations is reliant on the maximum altitude the balloon reaches. This means that if a balloon bursts prematurely or does not climb high enough, the upwards extent of temperature and humidity measurements will be limited, which is a big issue for climate networks like GRUAN that rely on this information.

=== Environmental issues ===
While weather forecasting relies increasingly on satellites and radar technology, it still uses weather balloons. These devices, launched from thousands of stations worldwide, ascend into the atmosphere to collect meteorological data. The United States, for example, releases approximately 76,600 balloons annually (an average of around 210 per day), while Canada launches 22,000.

Weather balloon bursting after reaching stratosphere, dispersing shards of latex debris across earth

Weather balloons, after reaching an altitude of approximately 35 kilometers, burst, releasing their instruments and the latex material they are made of. While the instruments are often recovered, the latex remains in the environment, posing a significant threat to marine ecosystems. Studies have shown that a substantial portion of weather balloons eventually end up in the ocean. For instance, one Australian researcher collected over 2,460 pieces of weather balloon debris from the Great Barrier Reef, estimating that up to 300 balloons per week may be released into the marine environment. This environmental impact underscores the need for sustainable alternatives in weather data collection.

Scientists and environmentalists have raised concerns about weather balloons' environmental impact. The latex material, which can persist in the ocean for extended periods, can harm marine life, including sea turtles, birds, and fish. Efforts to minimize the environmental impact of weather balloons include developing biodegradable materials and improved recovery methods. However, the continued reliance on weather balloons for meteorological data challenges balancing the need for accurate weather forecasts with environmental sustainability.

== See also ==
- Atmospheric sounding
- Ceiling balloon
- High-altitude balloon
- SCR-658 radar
- Skyhook balloon
- Timeline of hydrogen technologies
- High-altitude platform
