= SCR-108 =

US Army radio truck

SCR-108 Radio Truck
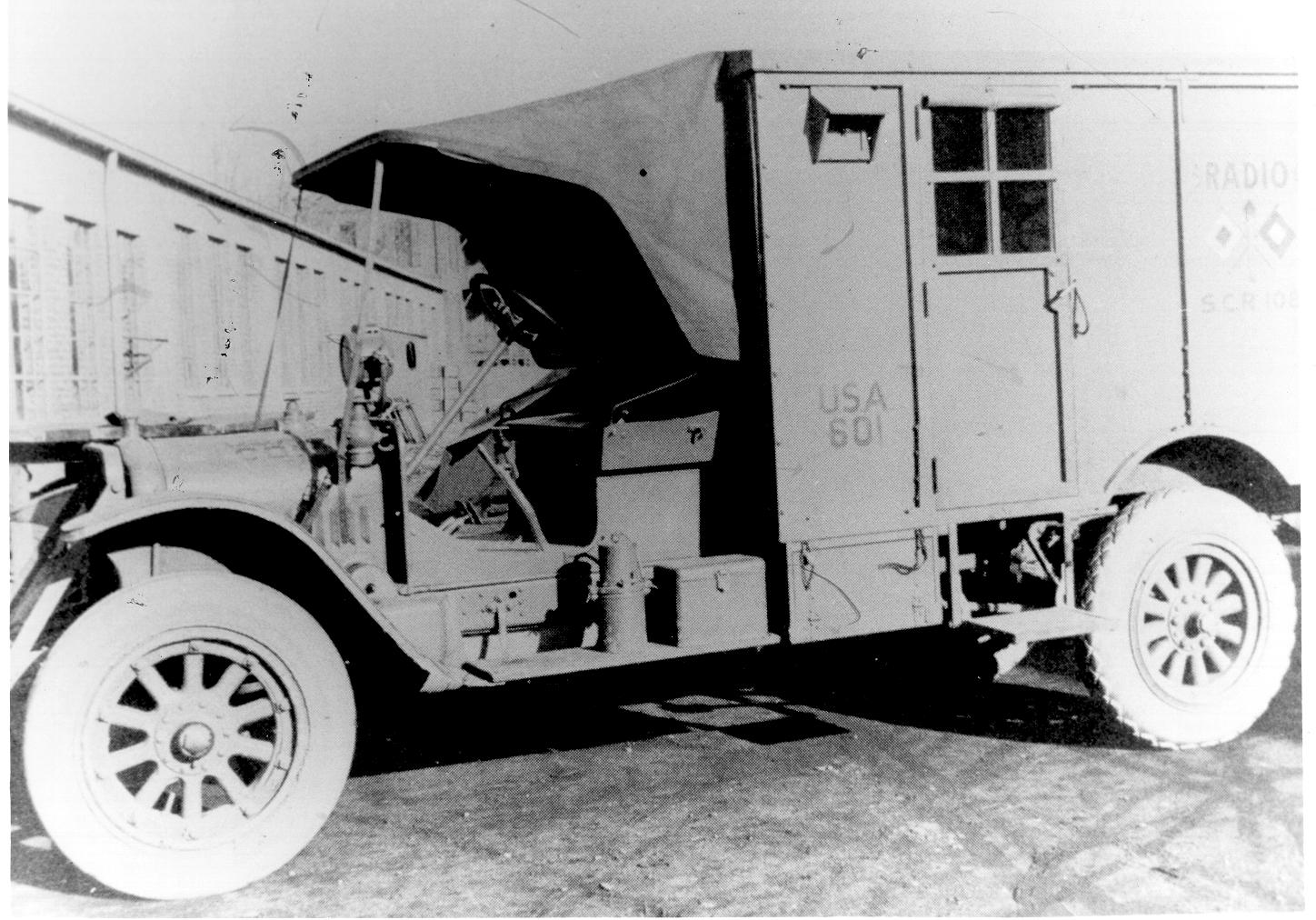
- Type: Radio truck
- Place of origin: United States

Service history
- In service: 1920-?
- Used by: US Army
- Wars: World War I ?

Production history
- Designed: 1919
- Manufacturer: White Motor Company
- Variants: 1

Specifications
- Mass: 1 1/2 ton
- Length: 120 inches
- Width: 64 inches
- Height: 64 inches
- Crew: 4
- Armor: none
- Main armament: none

The SCR-108 Radio Truck was a Signal Corps Radio vehicle used by the United States Army during and after World War I for short range air-to-ground communications,

== Use ==
This truck was assigned to squadron headquarters in order to communicate with the SCR-68 airplane radio as well as the others in its class. eventually replaced by the SCR-197 mobile radio station. The van is described as having room for 3 operators and one squadron radio officer. One bench supports the SCR-67, SCR-54, and one amplifier with storage batteries held by clamps underneath the bench. on another bench is the SCR-79. a desk for the officer is installed with batteries underneath. a six volt circuit is provided for two lamps connected to storage batteries, and a 110 volt circuit with two lamps is provided if there is an external power source available.

== Components ==
(Note- all sets seem to have been upgraded to an A model)

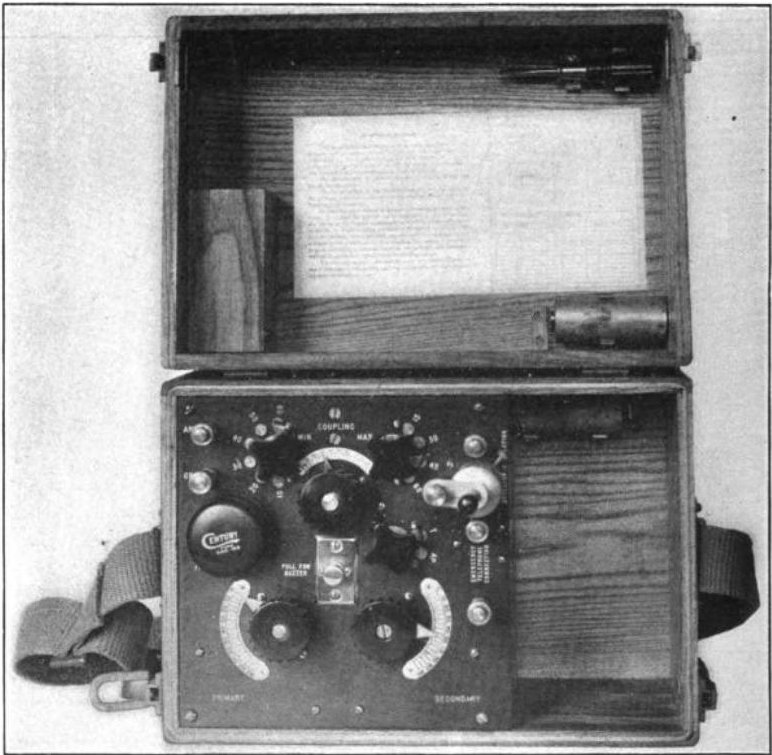
SCR-54

- SCR-54 Receiver- (BC-14), Crystal detector; inductively coupled; tuned primary and secondary; 150 foot inverted L antenna; wavelength range, 200 to 600 meters (500 kHz - 1500 kHz)
- SCR-67 Radiotelegraph- (BC-13), transmitting and receiving; for ground stations; has 1 oscillator, 1 modulator, 1 detector, and 2 amplifier vacuum tubes; wavelength range transmitting 250 to 450 meters (600 kHz - 1200 kHz), and receiving 200 to 600 meters (500 kHz - 1500 kHz).
- SCR-79 Radiotelegraph- (BC-25), transmitting and receiving; consists of an electrostatically coupled vacuum tube oscillator circuit for transmitting, and a vacuum tube detector and 2 stage amplifier for receiving; requires a low resistance antenna. wavelength is 500 to 1.100 meters (250 kHz - 600 kHz)
- SCR-121 Amplifier- (BC-44), 2 stage vacuum tube audio amplifier using iron core transformers

== Variants ==
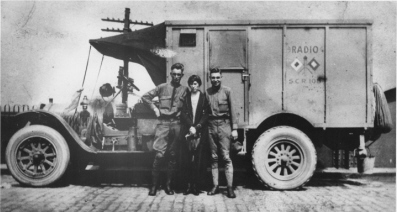
SCR-108 Radio truck

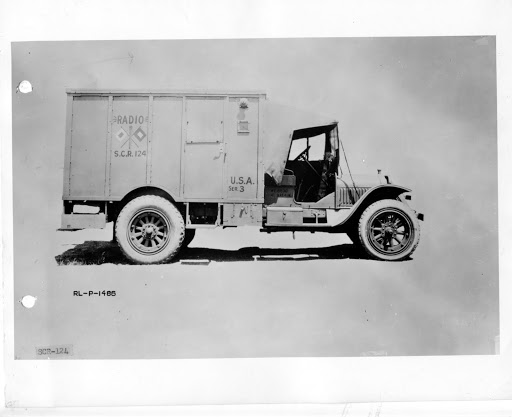
SCR-124 Radio Truck

The SCR-124 was evidently housed in a similar truck, and was assigned to division and Corps level headquarters. it carried the following components-

- SCR-99 Radiotelegraph
- SCR-121
- SCR-54
- SCR-82 battery charger (replaced by SCR-110)
- SCR-79.
- SCR-97 Radiotelephone

== See also ==
- Radio Tractor
- Signal Corps Radio
- Crystal radio
