= Walkie-talkie =

Hand-held portable two-way communications device

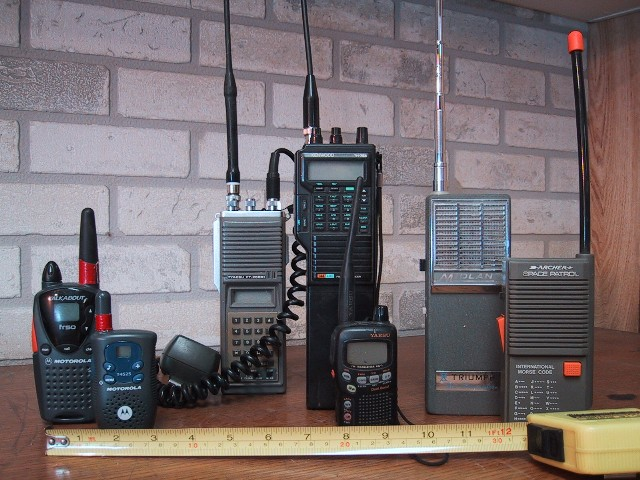
- Recreational, toy and amateur radio walkie-talkies
- Type: Wireless telecommunications device
- Inventor: Donald Hings
- Inception: 1937; 89 years ago
- Available: Yes

A walkie-talkie, more formally known as a handheld transceiver or handheld radio, is a hand-held, portable, two-way radio transceiver. Its development during the Second World War has been variously credited to Donald Hings, radio engineer Alfred J. Gross, and to Henryk Magnuski and engineering teams at Motorola. First used for infantry, similar designs were created for field artillery and tank units. After the war, walkie-talkies spread to public safety and eventually commercial and jobsite work.

Typical walkie-talkies resemble a telephone handset, with a speaker built into one end and a microphone in the other (in some devices the speaker is also used as the microphone) and an antenna mounted on the top of the unit. They are held up to the face to talk. A walkie-talkie is a half-duplex communication device. Multiple walkie-talkies use a single radio channel, and only one radio on the channel can transmit at a time, although any number can listen. The transceiver is normally in receive mode; when the user wants to talk they must press a "push-to-talk" (PTT) button that turns off the receiver and turns on the transmitter. Some units have additional features such as sending calls, call reception with vibration alarm, keypad locking, and a stopwatch. Smaller walkie-talkies are also very popular among young children.

In accordance with ITU Radio Regulations, article 1.73, a walkie-talkie is classified as radio station/land mobile station.

== History ==
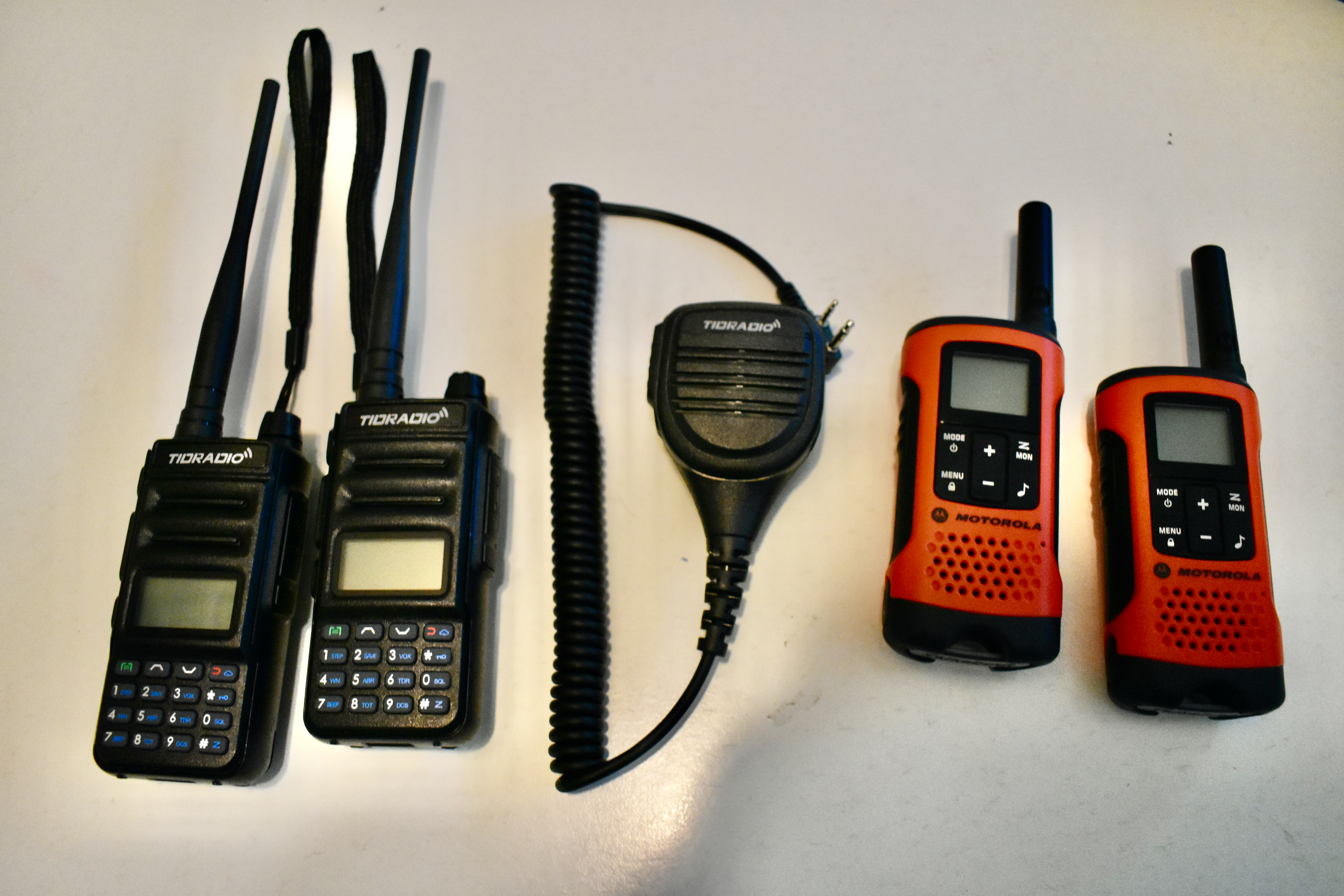
Assorted two-way Family Radio Service (FRS) and General Mobile Radio Service (GMRS) walkie talkies with hand mic

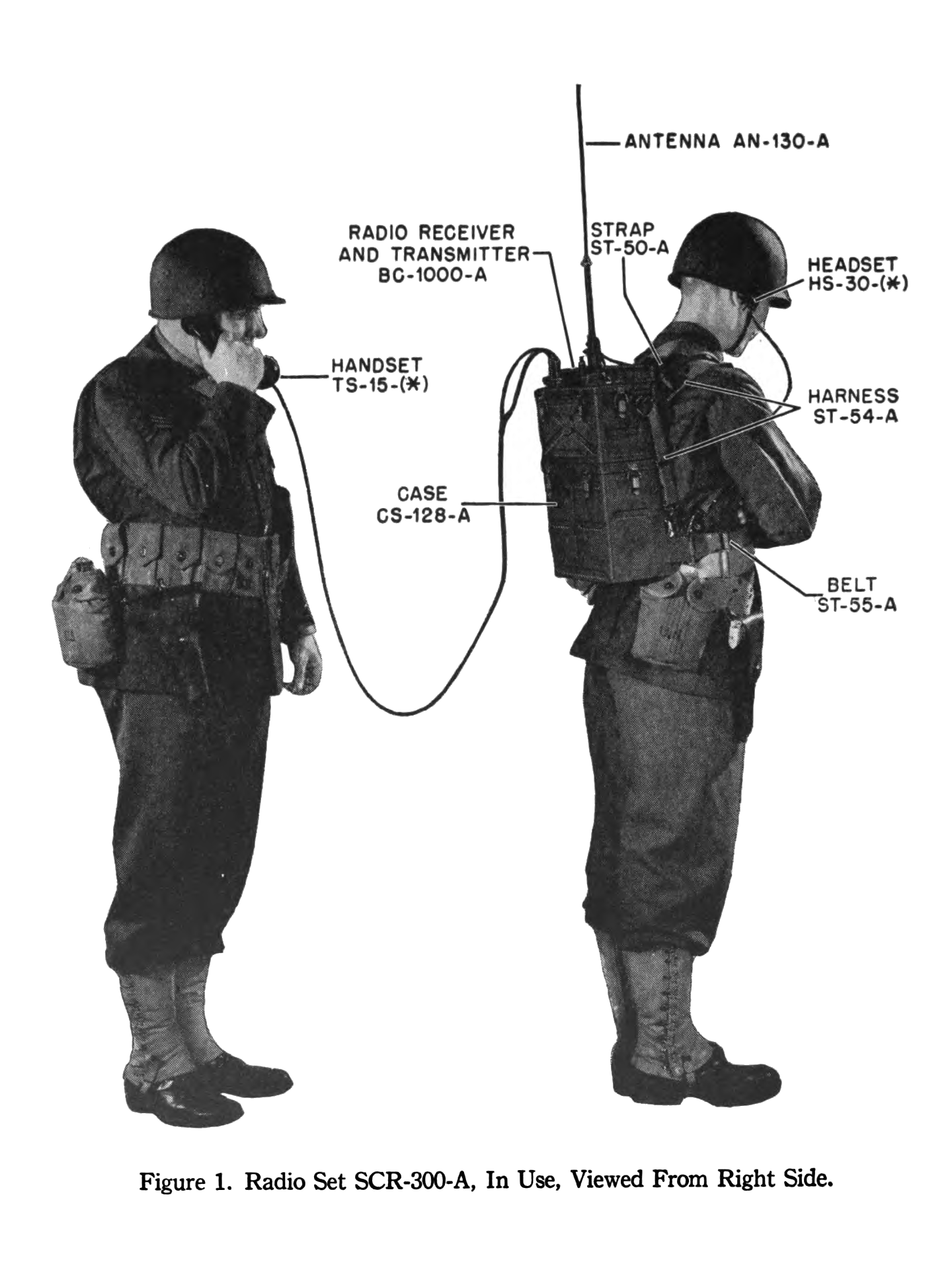
A SCR-300 military backpack transceiver, nicknamed "walkie talkie"

Handheld two-way radios were developed by the military from backpack radios carried by a soldier in an infantry squad to keep the squad in contact with their commanders. The Canadian inventor Donald Hings was the first to create a portable radio signaling system for his employer CM&S in 1937. He called the system a "packset", although it later became known as a "walkie-talkie". In 2001, Hings received the Order of Canada for the device's significance to the war effort. Hings' model C-58 "Handie-Talkie" was in military service by 1942, the result of a secret R&D effort that began in 1940.

Alfred J. Gross, a radio engineer and one of the developers of the Joan-Eleanor system, also worked on the early technology behind the walkie-talkie between 1938 and 1941, and is sometimes credited with inventing it.

The first device to be widely nicknamed a "walkie-talkie" was developed by the US military during World War II, the backpacked Motorola SCR-300. It was created by an engineering team in 1940 at the Galvin Manufacturing Company (forerunner of Motorola). The team consisted of Marion Bond, Lloyd Morris, Bill Vogel, Dan Noble, who conceived of the design using frequency modulation, and Henryk Magnuski, who was the principal RF engineer.

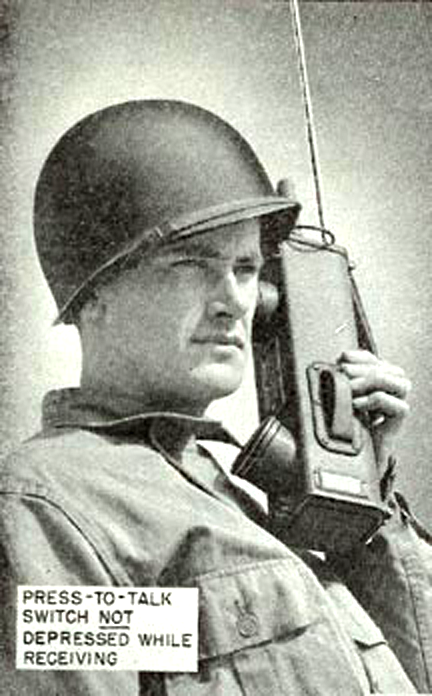
A SCR-536 US military "handie talkie", the first hand-held walkie-talkie

The first handheld walkie-talkie was the AM SCR-536 transceiver from 1941, also made by Motorola, named the Handie-Talkie (HT). The terms are often confused today, but the original walkie-talkie referred to the back mounted model, while the handie-talkie was the device which could be held entirely in the hand. Both devices used vacuum tubes and were powered by high voltage dry cell batteries.

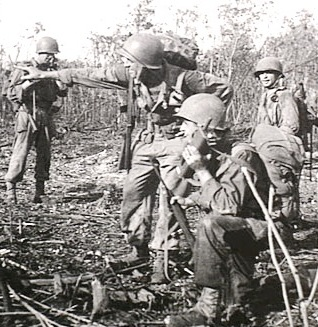
Noemfoor, Dutch New Guinea, July 1944. A US soldier (foreground) uses a Handie-Talkie during the Battle of Noemfoor.

Following World War II, Raytheon developed the SCR-536's military replacement, the AN/PRC-6. The AN/PRC-6 circuit used 13 vacuum tubes (receiver and transmitter); a second set of thirteen tubes was supplied with the unit as running spares. The unit was factory set with one crystal which could be changed to a different frequency in the field by replacing the crystal and re-tuning the unit. It used a 24-inch whip antenna. There was an optional handset that could be connected to the AN/PRC-6 by a 5-foot cable. An adjustable strap was provided for carrying and support while operating.

In the mid-1970s, the United States Marine Corps initiated an effort to develop a squad radio to replace the unsatisfactory helmet-mounted AN/PRR-9 receiver and receiver/transmitter handheld AN/PRT-4 (both developed by the US Army). The AN/PRC-68, first produced in 1976 by Magnavox, was issued to the Marines in the 1980s, and was adopted by the US Army as well.

The abbreviation HT, derived from Motorola's "Handie-Talkie" trademark, is commonly used to refer to portable handheld ham radios, with "walkie-talkie" often used as a layman's term or specifically to refer to a toy. Public safety and commercial users generally refer to their handhelds simply as "radios". Surplus Motorola Handie-Talkies found their way into the hands of ham radio operators immediately following World War II. Motorola's public safety radios of the 1950s and 1960s were loaned or donated to ham groups as part of the Civil Defense program. To avoid trademark infringement, other manufacturers use designations such as "Handheld Transceiver" or "Handie Transceiver" for their products.

== Uses ==
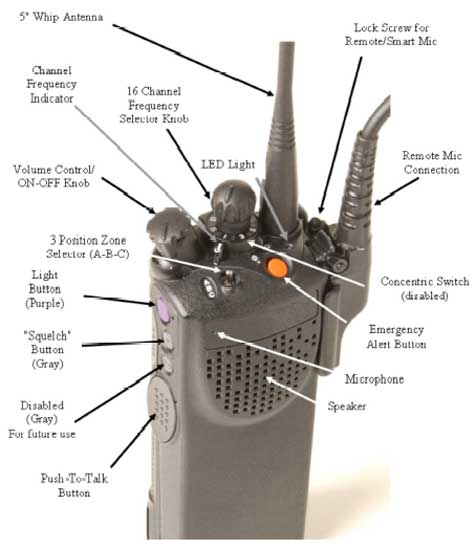
A modern Project 25 capable professional walkie-talkie

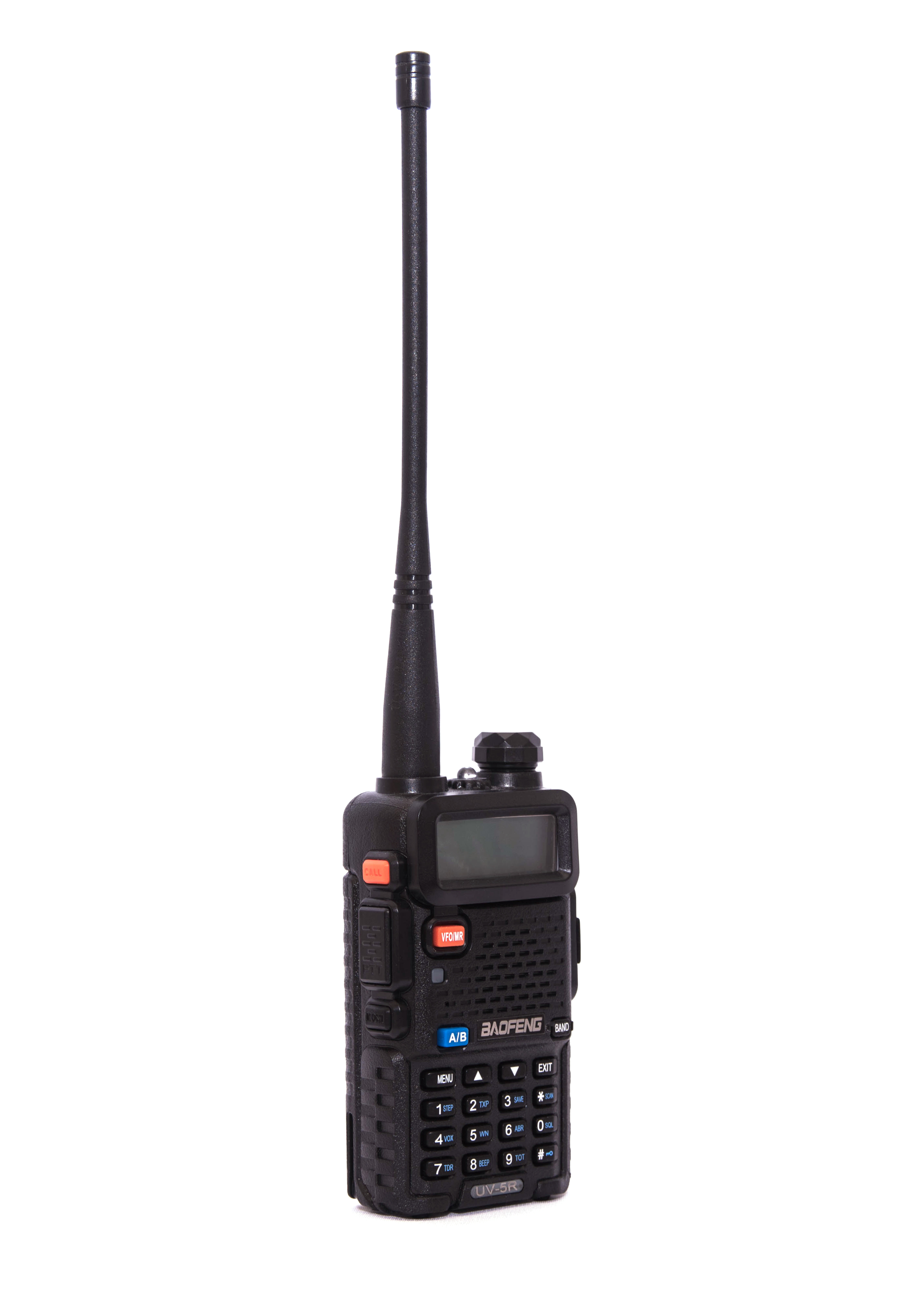
A Baofeng UV-5R, a popular inexpensive radio from China

An Icom IC-F3GS Radio

Walkie-talkies are widely used in any setting where portable radio communications are necessary, including business, public safety, military, outdoor recreation, and the like, and devices are available at numerous price points from inexpensive analog units sold as toys up to ruggedized (i.e. waterproof or intrinsically safe) analog and digital units for use on boats or in heavy industry. Most countries allow the sale of walkie-talkies for, at least, business, marine communications, and some limited personal uses such as CB radio, as well as for amateur radio designs.

Walkie-talkies for public safety, and commercial and industrial uses may be part of trunked radio systems, which dynamically allocate radio channels for more efficient use of the limited radio spectrum. Such systems always work with a base station that acts as a repeater and controller, although individual handsets and mobiles may have a mode that bypasses the base station.

Walkie-talkies, thanks to increasing use of miniaturized electronics, can be made very small, with some personal two-way ultra high frequency (UHF) radio models being smaller than a deck of cards (though VHF and HF units can be substantially larger due to the need for larger antennas and battery packs). In addition, as costs come down, it is possible to add advanced squelch capabilities such as CTCSS (analog squelch) and DCS (digital squelch) (often marketed as "privacy codes") to inexpensive radios, as well as voice scrambling and trunking capabilities. Some units (especially amateur HTs) also include dual-tone multi-frequency keypads for remote operation of various devices such as repeaters. Some models include voice-operated switch capability for hands-free operation, as well as the ability to attach external microphones and speakers.

Consumer and commercial equipment differ in a number of ways; commercial gear is generally ruggedized, with metal cases, and often has only a few specific frequencies programmed into it (often, though not always, with a computer or other outside programming device; older units can simply swap crystals), since a given business or public safety agent must often abide by a specific frequency allocation. Consumer gear, on the other hand, is generally made to be small, lightweight, and capable of accessing any channel within the specified band, not just a subset of assigned channels.

=== Military ===
Military organizations use handheld radios for a variety of purposes. Modern units such as the AN/PRC-148 Multiband Inter/Intra Team Radio (MBITR) can communicate on a variety of bands and modulation schemes and include encryption capabilities.

=== Amateur radio ===
Walkie-talkies (also known as HTs or "handheld transceivers") are widely used among amateur radio operators. While converted commercial gear by companies such as Motorola is not uncommon, many companies such as Yaesu, Icom, and Kenwood design models specifically for amateur use. While superficially similar to commercial and personal units (including such things as CTCSS and DCS squelch functions, used primarily to activate amateur radio repeaters), amateur gear usually has a number of features that are not common to other gear, including:

- Wide-band receivers, often including radio scanner functionality, for listening to non-amateur radio bands.
- Multiple bands; while some operate only on specific bands such as 2 meters or 70 cm, others support several UHF and VHF amateur allocations available to the user.
- Since amateur allocations usually are not channelized, the user can dial in any frequency desired in the authorized band (whereas commercial HTs usually only allow the user to tune the radio into a number of already programmed channels). This is known as variable frequency operation ("VFO") mode.
- Multiple modulation schemes: a few amateur HTs may allow modulation modes other than FM, including AM, SSB, and CW, and digital modes such as radioteletype or PSK31. Some may have TNCs built in to support packet radio data transmission without additional hardware.

Digital voice modes are available on some amateur HTs. For example, newer additions to the Amateur Radio service are Next Generation Digital Narrowband (NXDN) and Digital Smart Technology for Amateur Radio or D-STAR. Handheld radios with these technologies have several advanced features, including narrower bandwidth, simultaneous voice and messaging, GPS position reporting, and callsign routed radio calls over a wide-ranging international network.

As mentioned, commercial walkie-talkies can sometimes be reprogrammed to operate on amateur frequencies. Amateur radio operators may do this for cost reasons or due to the fact that Public Safety grade commercial gear is more solidly constructed and better designed than purpose-built amateur gear that is built to a price.

=== Personal use ===
The personal walkie-talkie has become popular also because of licence-free services (such as the U.S. FRS, Europe's PMR446 and Australia's UHF CB) in other countries. While FRS walkie-talkies are also sometimes used as toys because mass-production makes them low in cost, they have proper superheterodyne receivers and are a useful communication tool for both business and personal use. The boom in licence-free transceivers has, however, been a source of frustration to users of licensed services which are sometimes interfered with. For example, FRS and GMRS overlap in the United States, resulting in substantial pirate use of the GMRS frequencies. Use of the GMRS frequencies (USA) requires a license; however most users either disregard this requirement or are unaware. Canada reallocated frequencies for licence-free use due to heavy interference from US GMRS users. The European PMR446 channels fall in the middle of a United States UHF amateur allocation, and the US FRS channels interfere with public safety communications in the United Kingdom. Designs for personal walkie-talkies are in any case tightly regulated, generally requiring non-removable antennas (with a few exceptions such as CB radio and the United States MURS allocation) and forbidding modified radios.

Most personal walkie-talkies sold are designed to operate in UHF allocations, and are designed to be very compact, with buttons for changing channels and other settings on the face of the radio and a short, fixed antenna. Most such units are made of heavy, often brightly colored plastic, though some more expensive units have ruggedized metal or plastic cases. Commercial-grade radios are often designed to be used on allocations such as GMRS or MURS (the latter of which has had very little readily available purpose-built equipment). In addition, CB walkie-talkies are available, but less popular due to the propagation characteristics of the 27 MHz band and the general bulkiness of the gear involved.

Personal walkie-talkies are generally designed to give easy access to all available channels (and, if supplied, squelch codes) within the device's specified allocation.

Personal two-way radios are also sometimes combined with other electronic devices; Garmin's Rino series combine a GPS receiver in the same package as an FRS/GMRS walkie-talkie (allowing Rino users to transmit digital location data to each other). Some personal radios also include receivers for AM and FM broadcast radio and, where applicable, NOAA Weather Radio and similar systems broadcasting on the same frequencies. Some designs also allow the sending of text messages and pictures between similarly equipped units.

While jobsite and government radios are often rated in power output, consumer radios are frequently and controversially rated in mile or kilometer ratings. Because of the line of sight propagation of UHF signals, experienced users consider such ratings to be wildly exaggerated, and some manufacturers have begun printing range ratings on the package based on terrain as opposed to simple power output.

While the bulk of personal walkie-talkie traffic is in the 27 MHz and 400–500 MHz area of the UHF spectrum, there are some units that use the "Part 15" 49 MHz band (shared with cordless phones, baby monitors, and similar devices) as well as the "Part 15" 900 MHz band; in the US at least, units in these bands do not require licenses as long as they adhere to FCC Part 15 power output rules. A company called TriSquare is, as of July 2007, marketing a series of walkie-talkies in the United States, based on frequency-hopping spread spectrum technology operating in this frequency range under the name eXRS (eXtreme Radio Service—despite the name, a proprietary design, not an official allocation of the US FCC). The spread-spectrum scheme used in eXRS radios allows up to 10 billion virtual "channels" and ensures private communications between two or more units.

=== Recreation ===
An inexpensive children's walkie-talkie

Low-power versions, exempt from licence requirements, are also popular children's toys such as the Fisher Price Walkie-Talkie for children illustrated in the top image on the right. Prior to the change of CB radio from licensed to "permitted by part" (FCC rules Part 95) status, the typical toy walkie-talkie available in North America was limited to 100 milliwatts of power on transmit and using one or two crystal-controlled channels in the 27 MHz citizens' band using amplitude modulation (AM) only. Later toy walkie-talkies operated in the 49 MHz band, some with frequency modulation (FM), shared with cordless phones and baby monitors. The lowest cost devices are very simple electronically (single-frequency, crystal-controlled, generally based on a simple discrete transistor circuit where "grown-up" walkie-talkies use chips), may employ super regenerative receivers, and may lack even a volume control, but they may nevertheless be elaborately decorated, often superficially resembling more "grown-up" radios such as FRS or public safety gear. Unlike more costly units, low-cost toy walkie-talkies may not have separate microphones and speakers; the receiver's speaker sometimes doubles as a microphone while in transmit mode.

An unusual feature, common on children's walkie-talkies but seldom available otherwise even on amateur models, is a "code key", that is, a button allowing the operator to transmit Morse code or similar tones to another walkie-talkie operating on the same frequency. Generally the operator depresses the PTT button and taps out a message using a Morse Code crib sheet attached as a sticker to the radio. However, as Morse Code has fallen out of wide use outside amateur radio circles, some such units either have a grossly simplified code label or no longer provide a sticker at all.

In addition, Family Radio Service UHF radios will sometimes be bought and used as toys, though they are not generally explicitly marketed as such (but see Hasbro's ChatNow line, which transmits both voice and digital data on the FRS band).

Some cellular telephone networks offer a push-to-talk handset that allows walkie-talkie-like operation over the cellular network, without dialing a call each time. However, the cellphone provider must be accessible.

=== Specialized uses ===
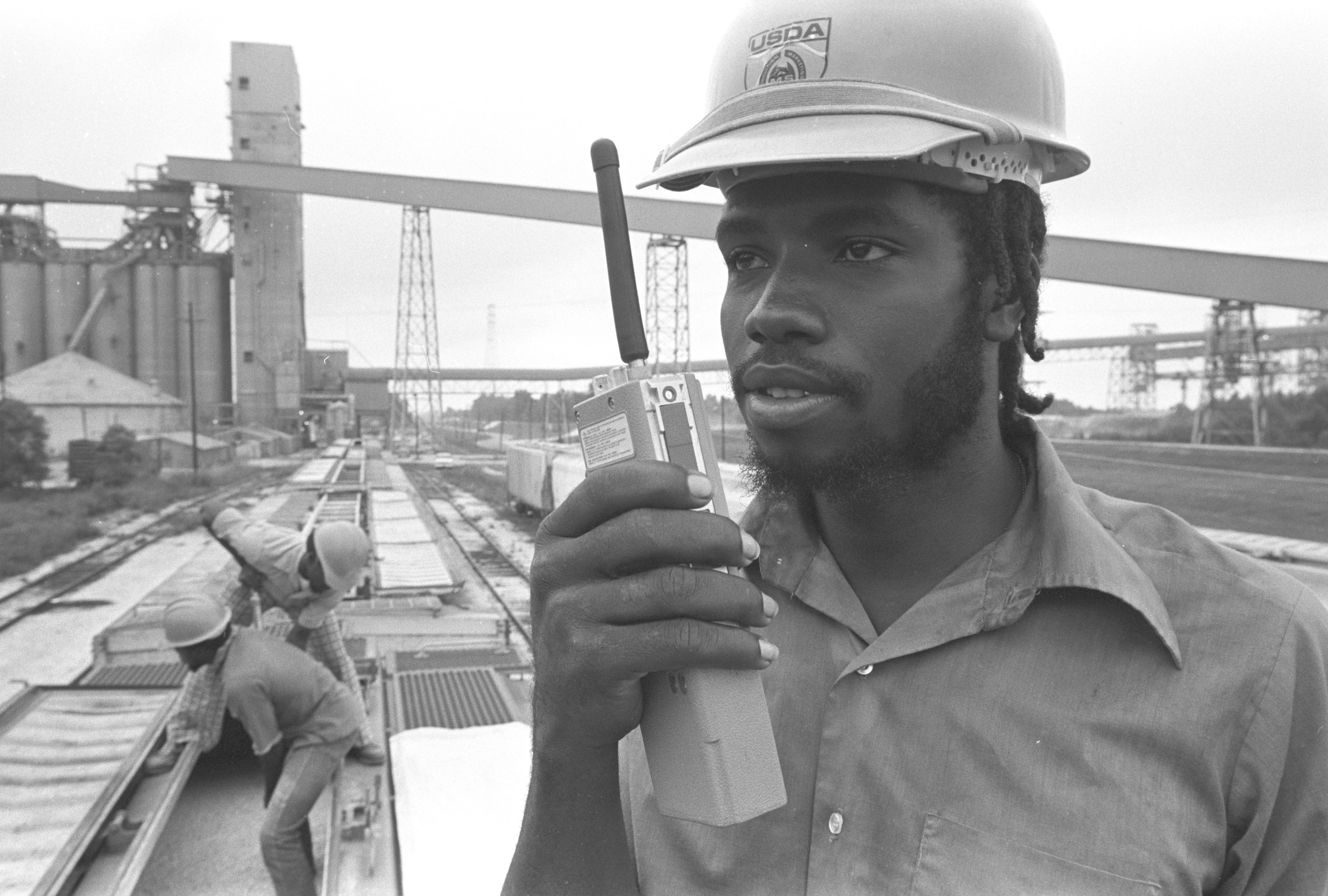
A USDA grain inspector with RCA TacTec walkie-talkie, New Orleans, 1976

In addition to land mobile use, waterproof walkie talkie designs are also used for marine VHF and aviation communications, especially on smaller boats and ultralight aircraft where mounting a fixed radio might be impractical or expensive. Often such units will have switches to provide quick access to emergency and information channels. They are also used in recreational UTVs to coordinate logistics, keep riders out of the dust and are usually connected to an intercom and headsets.

Intrinsically safe walkie-talkies are often required in heavy industrial settings where the radio may be used around flammable vapors. This designation means that the knobs and switches in the radio are engineered to avoid producing sparks as they are operated.

== Software emulation ==
A variety of mobile apps exist that mimic a walkie-talkie/push-to-talk style interaction. They are marketed as low-latency, asynchronous communication. The advantages touted over two-way voice calls include: the asynchronous nature not requiring full user interaction (like SMS) and it is voice over IP (VOIP) so it does not use minutes on a cellular plan.

Applications on the market that offer this walkie-talkie style interaction for audio include Hytera, Voxer, Zello, Orion Labs, Motorola Wave, and HeyTell, among others.

Other smartphone-based walkie-talkie products are made by companies like goTenna, Fantom Dynamics and BearTooth, and offer a radio interface. Unlike mobile data dependent applications, these products work by pairing to an app on the user's smartphone and working over a radio interface.

== Accessories ==
There are various types of accessories available for walkie-talkies such as rechargeable batteries, drop-in rechargers, multi-unit rechargers for charging as many as six units at a time, and an audio accessory jack that can be used for headsets or speaker microphones. Newer models allow the connection to wireless headsets via Bluetooth. Some models also came up with the wifi integration such as Motorola XIRP 8600i series.

== See also ==
- Mobile radio telephone – Pre-cellular mobile telephone systems
- MOTO Talk – 'Push-to-talk' calls feature available on some Motorola iDEN cellphones
- Satellite phone – Type of mobile phone
- Serval project – Project to enable peer to peer calling and texting on cellular devices
- Signal Corps Radio – U.S. Army radio systems
- Survival radio – Small radios carried to facilitate rescue in an emergency
- Tank phone – Phone on armoured vehicle exteriors for use by infantry
- Vehicular communication systems – Computer networks in which vehicles and roadside units are the communicating nodes
- Personal radio service – Group of radio services
