= Ceiling balloon =

Balloon observed to determine the height of the base of clouds

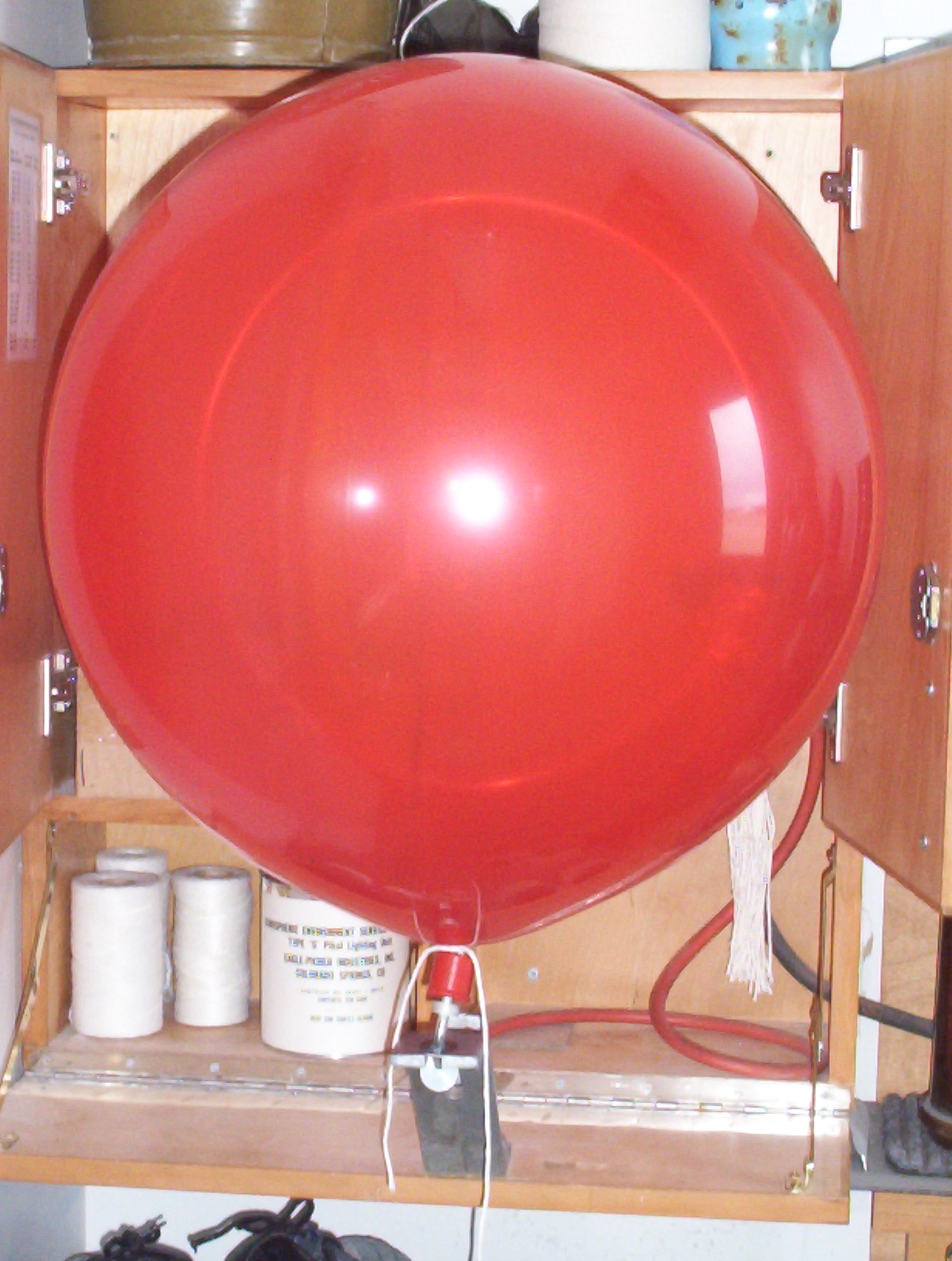
A fully inflated ceiling balloon

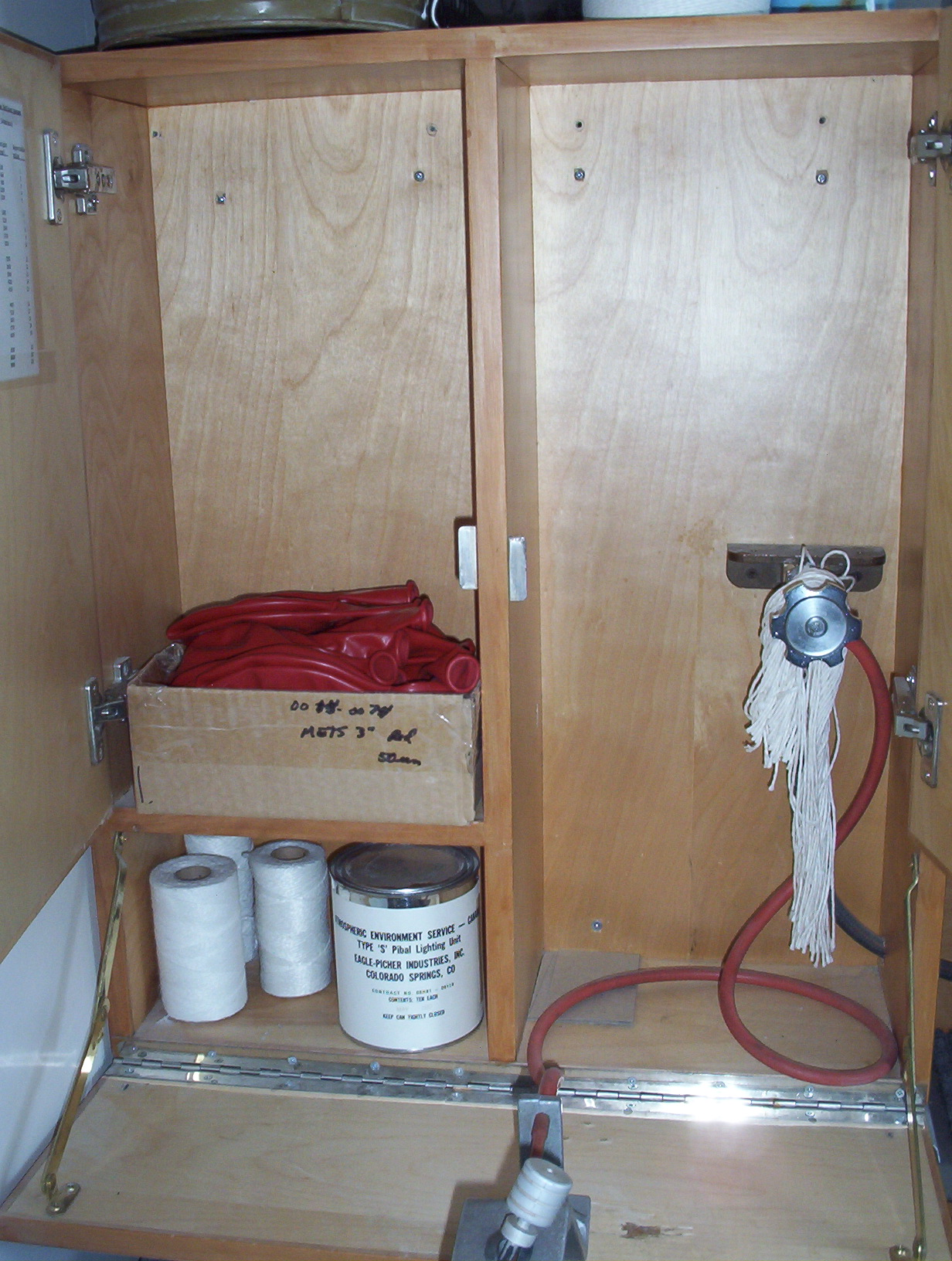
A ceiling balloon cabinet

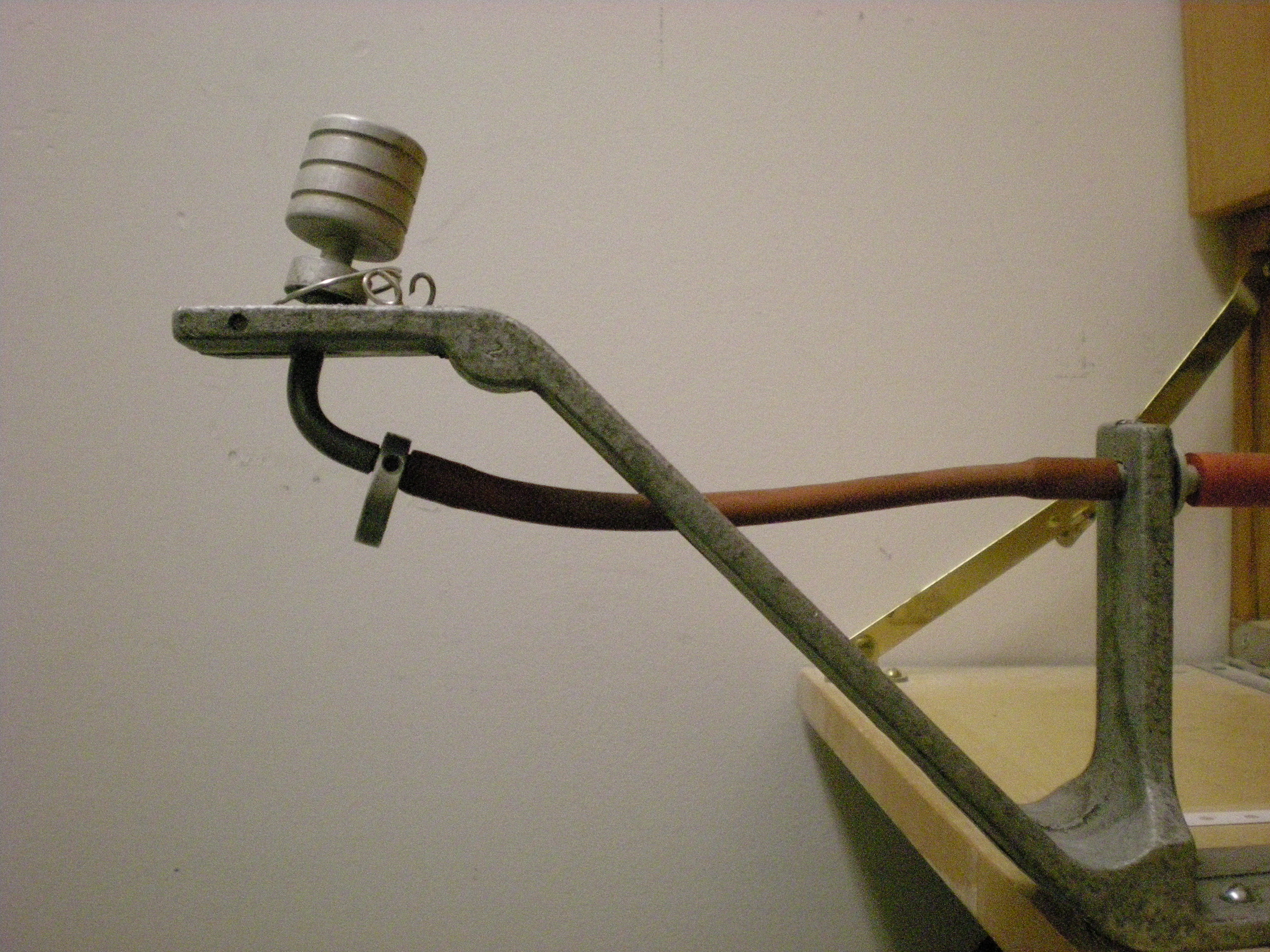
Close up of the filler stand

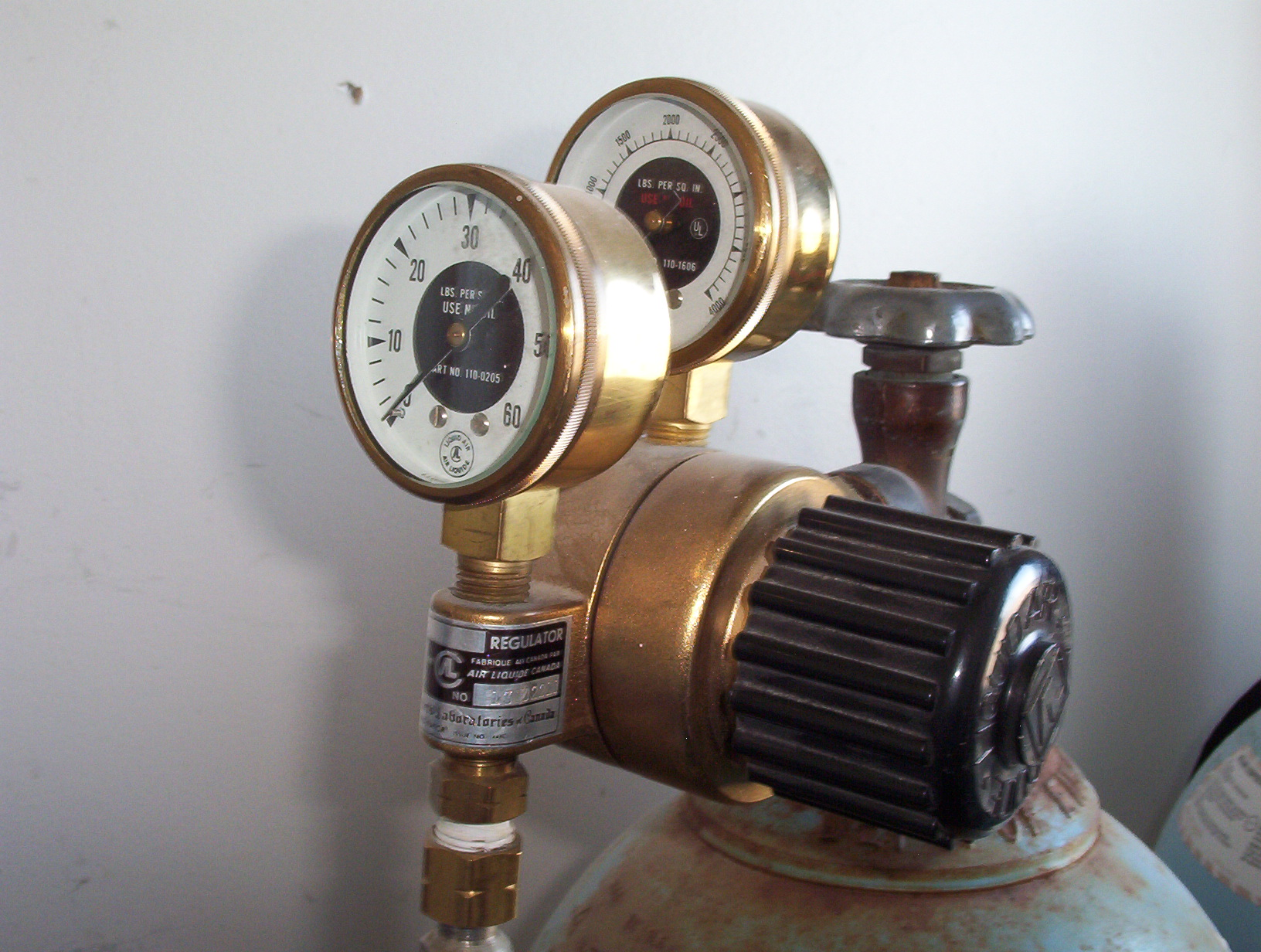
Regulator valve and pressure gauges attached to helium cylinder

A ceiling balloon also called a pilot balloon or pibal, is used by meteorologists to determine the height of the base of clouds above ground level during daylight hours. In the past, and sometimes today, a theodolite was used to track the balloon in order to determine the speed and direction of winds aloft. The principle behind the ceiling balloon is that timing of a balloon with a known ascent rate (how fast it climbs) from its release until it disappears into the clouds can be used to calculate the height of the bottom of the clouds.

== How it is used ==
A ceiling balloon is a small, usually red, (fluted) rubber balloon commonly measuring 76 mm (3 in) across prior to inflation, inflated to ~40 cm (~15.75 in) diameter. After inflation the balloon is taken outside and released. By timing the balloon from release until it enters the cloud a ceiling height can be obtained. When correctly inflated the balloon will rise at rate of 140 m/min (460 ft/min). The bases of clouds are very rarely flat and solid, so the ceiling height is not when the balloon disappears but when the colour begins to fade. The balloon can also be used to measure the vertical visibility into a layer of fog or blowing snow. In this case the balloon will begin to fade as soon as it is released, so the vertical visibility is when the balloon disappears. If the balloon is visible for a considerable distance into the cloud layer the observer should make note of it as it is of importance to aircraft.

The ceiling balloon is a reliable, safe and simple way to get an indication of the height of clouds. However, it does suffer from some disadvantages that the observer must be aware of. Rain and wet snow may slow the ascent of the balloon, giving a falsely high ceiling and high winds and poor visibility may cause the balloon to appear to enter the cloud before it actually does. As the balloon rises at a rate of 140 m/min (460 ft/min) it will take over five minutes for the balloon to reach 700 m (2300 ft). Beyond this height the ability to follow the balloon, even with binoculars, is poor, as even the slightest movement of the eye off the balloon will almost certainly ensure that it vanishes.

At night when it is not practical to use a balloon the ceiling projector is used. However, during twilight it may be impossible to use the ceiling projector and then a pibal (pilot balloon) light may be used. This is a simple flashlight bulb attached to a battery. To charge the battery it is immersed in water for three minutes and then tied to the balloon prior to inflation. These are rarely used today.

== Technical details ==
The balloons and associated equipment are usually stored in a cabinet mounted on a wall close to the gas cylinders. The cabinet has three doors one of which opens down and to it the filler stand is attached. At the top of the filler stand is an L-shaped pipe with two rings, a small one on the bottom and a larger one on the top called the inflation nozzle. The rings stop the tube from dropping through the stand or rising too far when the balloon is inflated. The top ring has several grooves cut into it, to help grip the balloon which is fitted to it.

At the bottom of the pipe is a weight that, when the precise amount of gas has been added, will lift to indicate the balloon is full. A rubber hose is attached to this pipe and passes through the filler stand twice. The first hole is larger than the tube to permit movement, while the second is used to hold the tubing in place.

From there the tube runs to a needle valve that controls the amount of gas flowing to the balloon. A second tube will then run from the valve to a regulator valve that is attached to the gas cylinder. This valve has two pressure gauges attached. One showing the total pressure remaining in the gas cylinder and the second showing the amount of gas flowing through the tubing. Typically the cylinder, which is made of steel and weighs about 140 lb (65 kg), contains the equivalent of about 200 ft^{3} (5.7 m^{3}) of gas at standard pressure, stored at a pressure of 2000 psi (14 megapascals) and will inflate approximately 120 balloons (according to a nominal diameter of 45 cm).

On the opposite side of the cabinet is space to store balloons, string and pibal lights. The gas used to fill the balloon is helium or hydrogen. Because of its low cost ceiling balloons are often filled with hydrogen gas, but sometimes helium is used.

The balloon is attached to the inflation nozzle and a piece of string is wound around the neck. After donning safety glasses and hearing protection a check is made to ensure the needle valve is fully closed. The main valve on the cylinder is then opened, followed by the regulator valve. Next, the needle valve is opened and the balloon begins to inflate. As the balloon reaches the correct size the inflation nozzle will begin to lift. At this point the needle valve is closed along with the regulator valve and cylinder valve. The string is then used to tie off the balloon neck to ensure that no gas can escape.

Caution must be used during inflation due to the occasional faulty balloon and its rupture. If the person inflating the balloon is not wearing goggles or hearing protectors then eye or ear damage can result.

== See also ==
- Weather balloon
- Observation balloon
- Timeline of hydrogen technologies
- Theodolite § Pibal
