= Signal Corps Radio =

U.S. Army radio systems

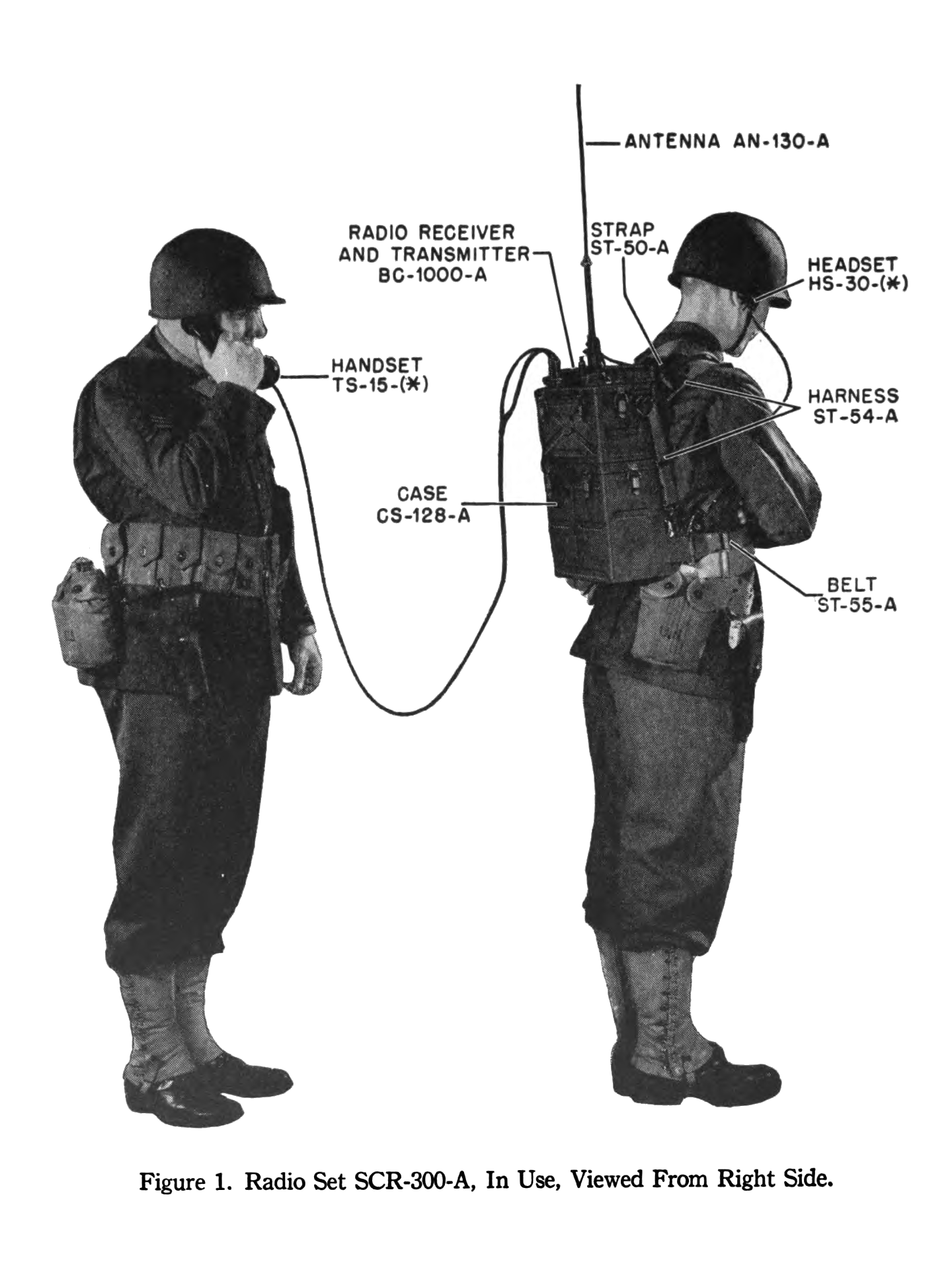
Example of a Signal Corps Radio set: the SCR-300-A

The Signal Corps Radio (SCR) was a U.S. Army military communications component that comprised "sets". Under the Army Nomenclature System, the abbreviation SCR initially designated Set, Complete Radio, but was later misinterpreted as Signal Corps Radio.

== Nomenclature ==
The term SCR was part of a nomenclature system developed for the U.S. Signal Corps, used at least as far back as World War I. Three-letter designators beginning with "SC" were used to denote complete systems, while one and two-letter designators (such as "BC", for basic component, "FT" for mounting, etc.) were used for components. Only a few system designators were used:

SCM
Set, Complete, Meteorological
SCR
Set, Complete, Radio
SCS
Set, Complete, System

== SCR radio sets ==
The U.S. Signal Corps used the term "sets" to denote specific groupings of individual components such as transmitters, receivers, power supplies, handsets, cases, and antennas. SCR radio sets ranged from the relatively small SCR-536 "handie talkie" to high-powered, truck-mounted mobile communications systems like the SCR-299 and large microwave radar systems such as the SCR-584 radar.

== SCS ==
The SCS designator was applied to groups of SCR-numbered sets comprising an extensive system, such as multiple radio sets employed in a ground-based fighter direction/control center. The SCR designator could be a single transmitting or receiving set, or a full set of both transmitting and receiving equipment.

== Additional designators ==
An additional designator, "RC" was used for subsystems or groups of accessories. The Joint Electronics Type Designation System which came into use in 1943 absorbed or superseded the SC designations.

== SCR communication radios by branch use ==
This is only a general list, quite a few radios crossed over between branches.

Armor

- SCR-78
- SCR-189
- SCR-245
- SCR-508 FM
- SCR-510 FM

Artillery

- SCR-109
- SCR-136
- SCR-161
- SCR-178
- SCR-179 pack
- SCR-194
- SCR-608 FM
- SCR-610 FM
- SCR-619 FM

Infantry

- SCR-77
- SCR-131
- SCR-195
- SCR-284
- SCR-300 FM
- SCR-536
- SCR-694

general use/command

- SCR-50
- SCR-97
- SCR-101
- SCR-105
- SCR-124
- SCR-171
- SCR-177
- SCR-193
- SCR-299
- SCR-506

Cavalry

- SCR-44 mule pack
- SCR-49 mule pack
- SCR-127 mule pack
- SCR-130 mule pack
- SCR-179 mule pack
- SCR-203 mule pack
- SCR-511 pogo stick

Coast artillery/AAA

- SCR-162
- SCR-543

Air Liaison (ground)

- SCR-54
- SCR-108
- SCR-188
- SCR-197
- SCR-237

Aircraft

- SCR-62 observation balloon
- SCR-64
- SCR-68
- SCR-80
- SCR-90
- SCR-91
- SCR-100
- SCR-133
- SCR-134
- SCR-135
- SCR-183
- SCR-187
- SCR-274
- SCR-283
- SCR-287
- SCR-522
- SCR-542
- SCR-729 Rebecca Mk IIA transponder

== Radar ==
- SCR-268 searchlight and gun control
- SCR-270 mobile long range early warning, VHF
- SCR-271 fixed long range early warning, VHF
- SCR-277 radio range
- SCR-289 improved -270
- SCR-527 medium range, VHF
- SCR-547 microwave radar/optical heightfinder
- SCR-584 gun control, microwave
- SCR-602 mobile, short range early warning
- SCR-658 weather balloon tracker
- SCR-784 light weight 584

== See also ==
- Joint Electronics Type Designation System
- List of U.S. Signal Corps Vehicles
- List of World War II electronic warfare equipment
