= SCR-536 =

U.S. WWII hand-held military radio

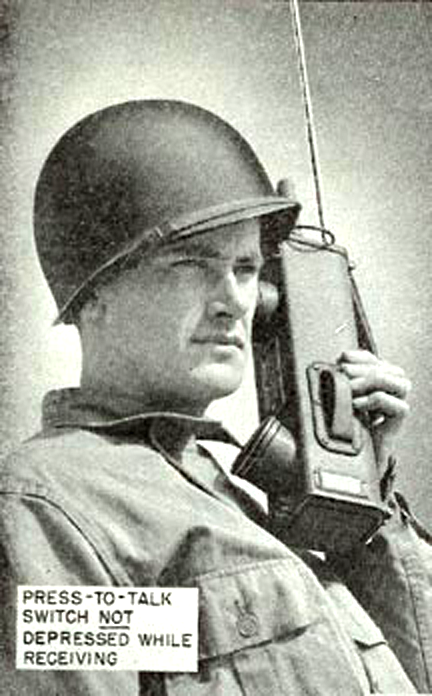
SCR-536 "handie talkie".

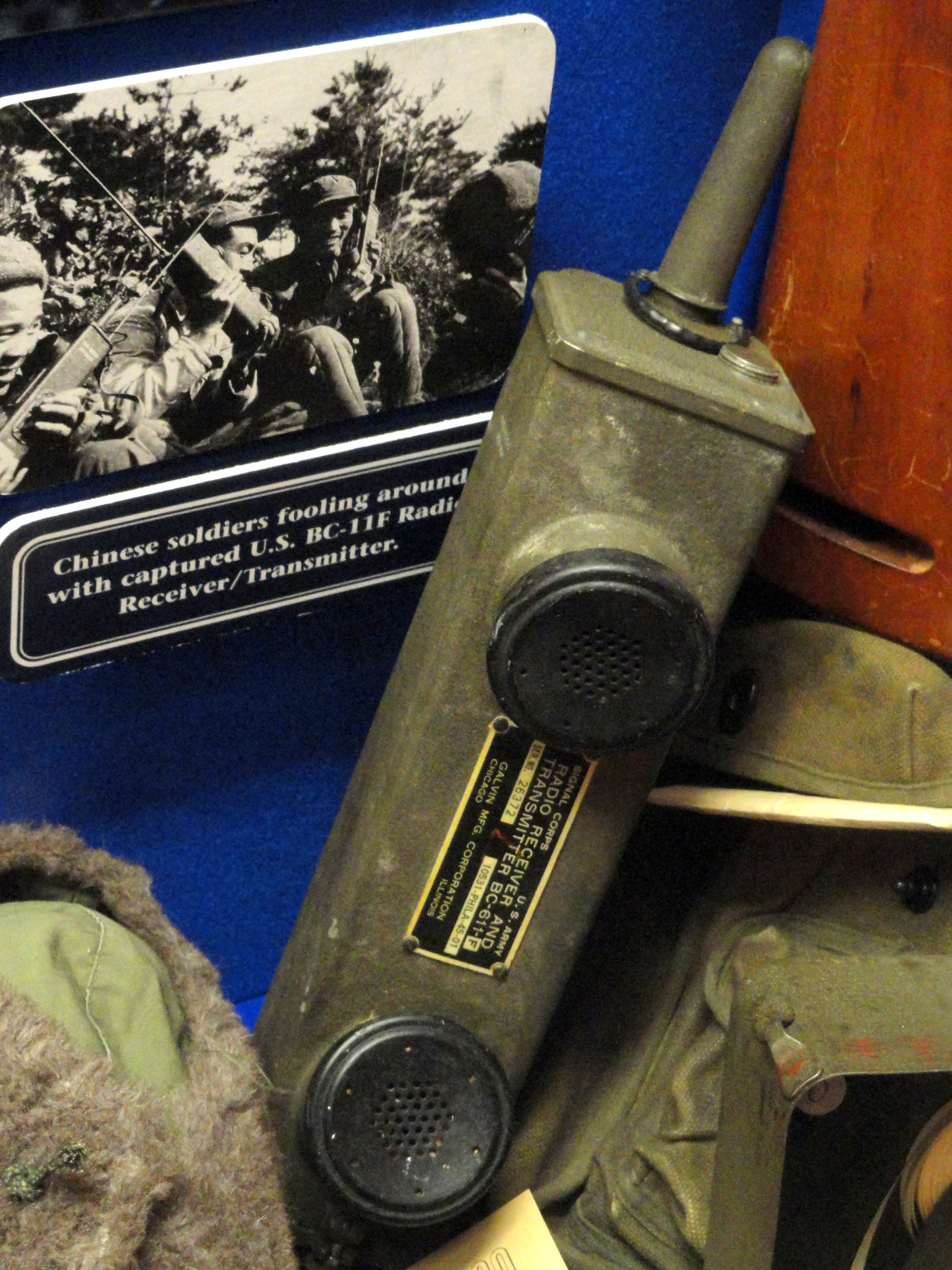
BC-611 on display at National Cryptologic Museum

The SCR-536 (also referred to as the BC-611) was a hand-held radio transceiver used by the US Army Signal Corps in World War II. It is popularly referred to as a walkie talkie, although it was originally designated a "handie talkie".

== History ==
The SCR-536 is often considered the first of modern hand-held, self-contained, "handie talkie" transceivers (two-way radios). It was developed in 1940 by a team led by Don Mitchell, chief engineer for Galvin Manufacturing (Motorola, now Motorola Solutions) and was the first true hand-held unit to see widespread use. By July 1941, it was in mass production. In November 1942, the SCR-536 received coverage in the amateur radio magazine QST. It appeared on the cover as well as in Signal Corps advertising, and was featured as part of an article on the Signal Corps, "Smallest field unit of the Signal Corps", in which a photo caption read: "it is not much larger or heavier than a conventional handset". It was carried among the first waves to hit Omaha Beach at Normandy in June 1944 (and in Italy, Sicily and North Africa before that). Every rifle company of the U.S. 29th Infantry division had six; one for each of the three rifle platoons, two for the weapons platoon, and one for the company CO. The Germans were deeply impressed by the SCR-536 and the SCR-300 after capturing several units in Sicily. By war’s end, 130,000 units had been manufactured by Motorola. They were also produced by other firms.

As of 2005, the SCR-536 is often restored and operated by vintage amateur radio enthusiasts and military radio collectors.

== Specifications ==
The SCR-536 incorporated five vacuum tubes in a waterproof case. There was no external power switch on the SCR-536. The operator pulled out or pushed in the antenna on the top, which operated an internal switch to turn the radio on or off. The power was supplied by a BA-37 1.5 volt dry battery for the filament supply and a 103.5 V BA-38 battery for plate supply. Battery life was about one day of normal use. The SCR-536 weighed 5 pounds (2.3 kg) with batteries and 3.85 pounds (1.75 kg) without batteries. The unit operated in AM voice mode between 3.5 and 6.0 MHz (85.65 and 49.97 m) frequency range on any one of 50 channels. Plug in crystals and coils were used to control the frequency of the receiver and transmitter. The antenna was a 40 inches (101.60 cm) telescoping rod that slid into the case. The SCR-536 had an RF output power of 360 milliwatts. The range of the unit varied with terrain; from a few hundred feet ( 100 meters ≈ 328.08 feet), to approximately 1 mile (1.6 km) over land, and 3 miles (4.8 km) over water.

Under the Army Nomenclature System, the BC-611 transceiver was the core component of the SCR-536 Signal Corps Radio set. The Signal Corps technical manual number was TM 11-235.

== Components ==
- BX-48 box for spare crystals and tubes (5 sets)
- BX-49 box for spare crystals and tubes (24 sets)
- BG-162 bag for batteries (BA-37, BA-38)
- CH-146 chest for equipment
- CH-233 chest for spare tubes, crystals, (400 items)
- CS-144 parachute case
- CS-156 canvas case
- CH-312 case for IE-37 tuning unit

== See also ==
- AN/ARC-5
- AN/PRC-6, post WW-II successor to the SCR-536.
- BC-348
- BC-654
- Collins Radio
- R-390A
- SCR-299
- Wireless Set No. 19
- Vintage amateur radio
- SCR-694
