= AN/PRC-6 =

U.S. military walkie-talkie, post WW-II

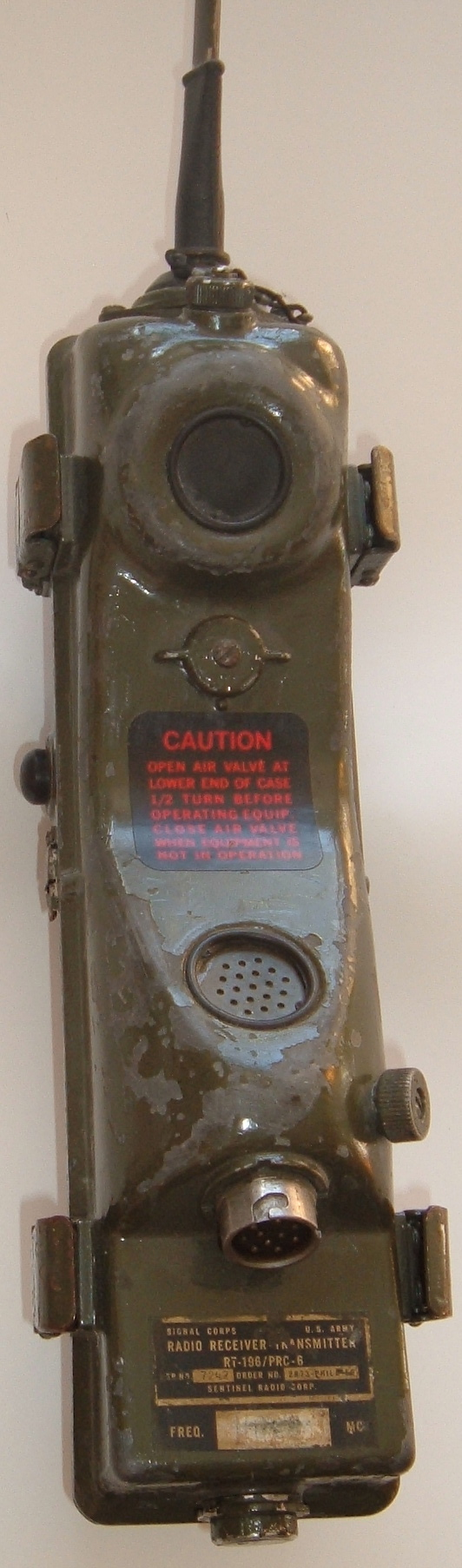
AN/PRC-6, somewhat battered from use.

The AN/PRC-6 is a walkie-talkie (correctly a "Handie Talkie) used by the U.S. military in the late Korean War era through the Vietnam War. Raytheon developed the RT-196/PRC-6 following World War II as a replacement for the SCR-536 "handy-talkie". The AN/PRC-6 operates using wide-band FM on a single crystal controlled frequency in the 47 to 55.4 MHz low band VHF band.

In accordance with the Joint Electronics Type Designation System (JETDS), the "AN/PRC-6" designation represents the 6th design of an Army-Navy electronic device for portable two-way communications radio. The JETDS system also now is used to name all Department of Defense electronic systems.

== History ==
The earliest known manual for the PRC-6 was the preliminary manual printed by Raytheon in 1949.

The AN/PRC-6 was designed and used by the US military during the Korean War, and was in use by the US Marine Corps as late as 1972. It was commonly known as the (correctly) "Handie Talkie" or (incorrectly) "walkie-talkie," "banana radio," or "Prick-6." The AN/PRC 6 was also used by various NATO nations. It was manufactured under license in France ("TR-PP-8") and Germany (6 channel version or PRC6-6). Israel too manufactured single channel equipment. Modernization of the AN/PRC6 resulted in various solid state crystal controlled and synthesized radios, usually with higher output ratings. For example, Greek valved sets were refurbished in the mid-1980s and converted into single channel solid state one watt units housed inside the original casing. These updated solid state versions were given various designations such as PRC-6T (for "Transistor"), PRC - 6T/180 (180 channel synthesized unit) and PRC - 6GY.

== Specifications ==
The AN/PRC-6 circuit uses 13 vacuum tubes for the receiver and transmitter combined, all but one tube are subminiature. The unit may be changed to a different frequency in the field by replacing the crystal and adjusting tuned circuits, using tuning indicator ID-292/PRC-6. The tuning chart inside the case is not accurate enough to properly align the unit. The AN/PRC-6 uses a 24 in (61 cm) whip antenna, with a BNC connector for an external direction finding antenna. There is an optional handset H-33*/PT that can be connected to the AN/PRC-6 by a 5 ft (1.5 m) cable. The RT-196 can be carried over the shoulder using a provided web sling. Rated power output is about 250 mW. The range is about one mile (1.5 km), but much less in jungle.

The frequency range of the PRC-6 covers the 6 meter amateur radio band (50-54 MHz in the US and Canada, 50-52 MHz in the United Kingdom), and the many versions of these sets are relatively available and cheap (around £30-40 in the UK) in comparison to other vintage military radios. As a result, many examples have been put on the air, although practical operation is hampered by the necessity of building new, custom power supplies (the original dry batteries, which supplied +1.5, +4.5, +45 and +90 volt outputs, being unobtainable or display pieces only) and the limited output power and range. In addition, a separate crystal and laborious retuning is required every time a frequency change takes place. Radios were shipped from the U.S. factory tuned with the 51.0 MHz crystal installed. For this reason 51 MHz is used as a net frequency at many Amateur Radio events, necessitating only the one crystal.

== Gallery ==
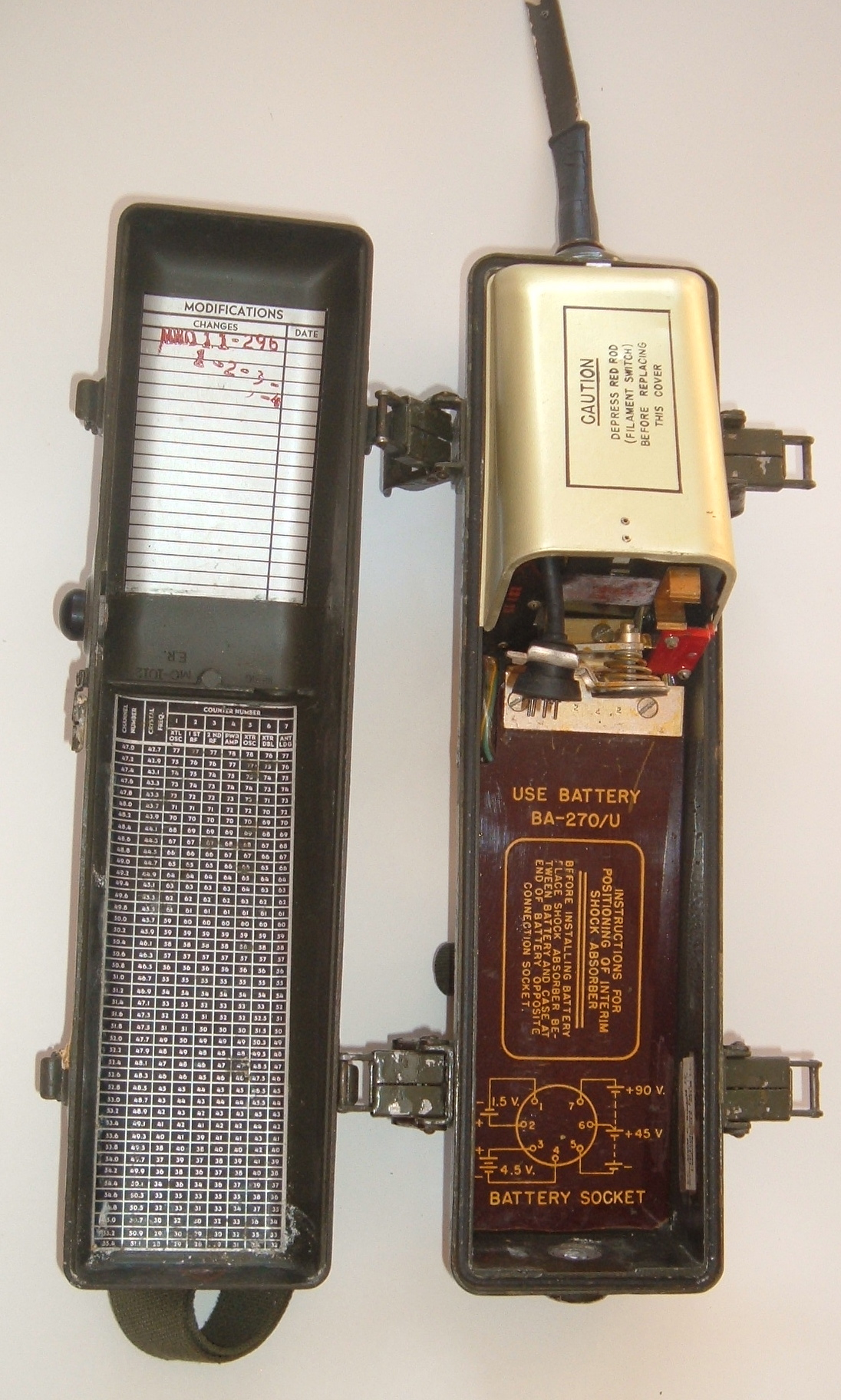
AN/PRC-6 with case opened.

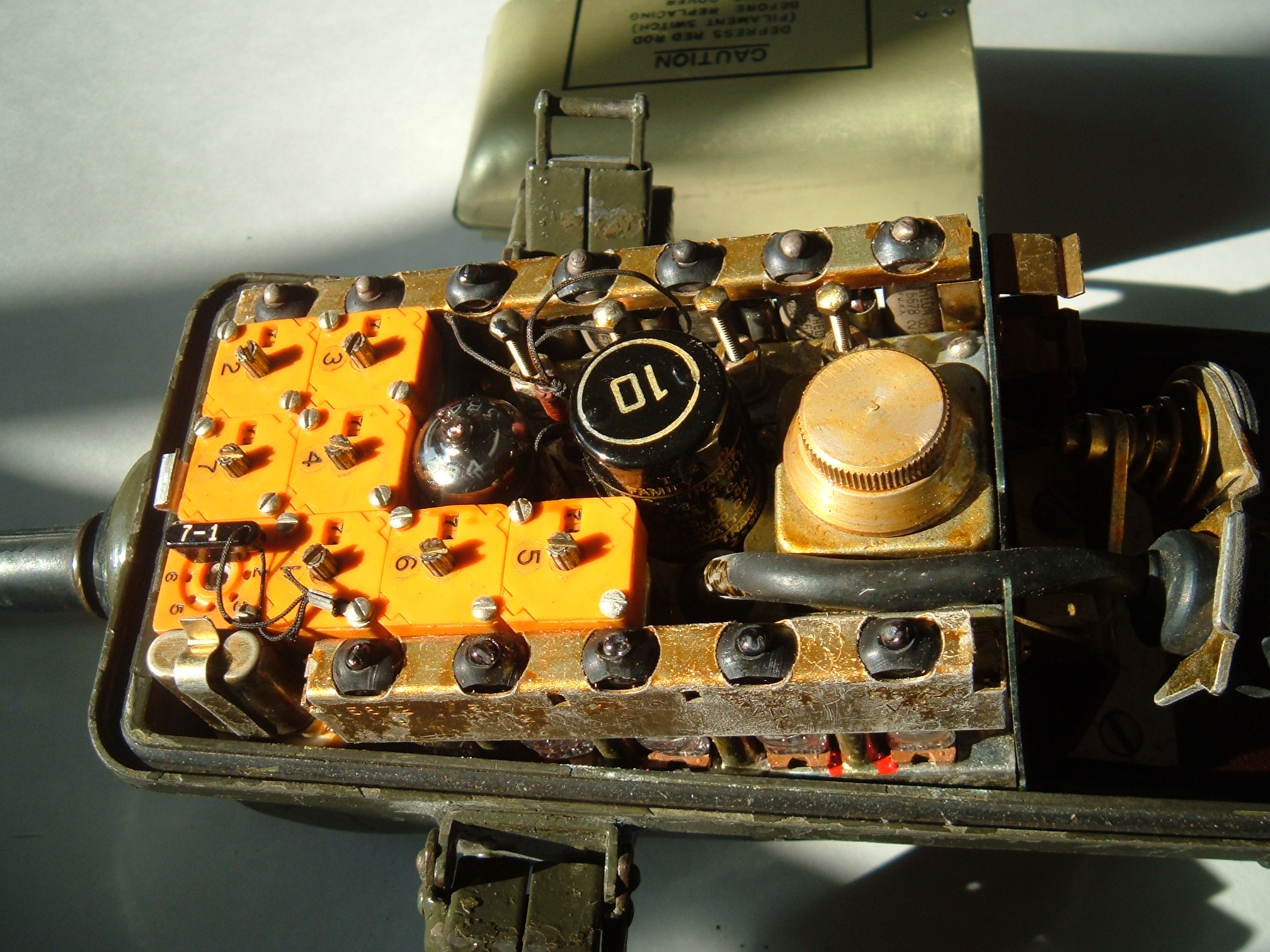
AN/PRC-6 open with electronics cover removed.

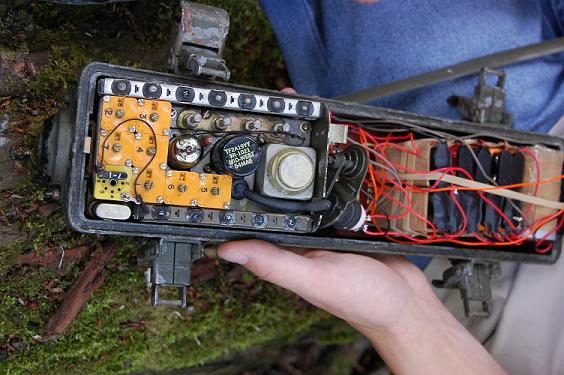
Internal view of homebrew battery arrangement.

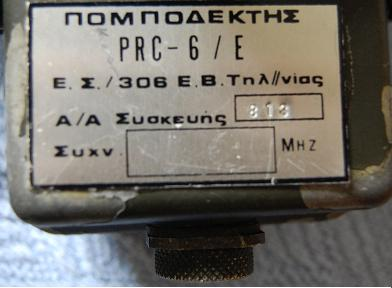
PRC - 6/E (Greek rebuild) data plate.

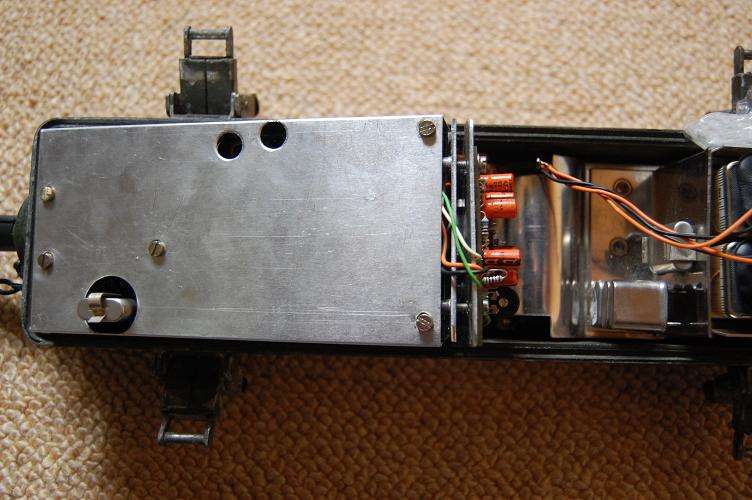
PRC - 6/E: Internal view of rebuilt set.

== See also ==
- SCR-300
- SCR-536
- List of military electronics of the United States
