= Land mobile station =

Mobile radio station in the land mobile service

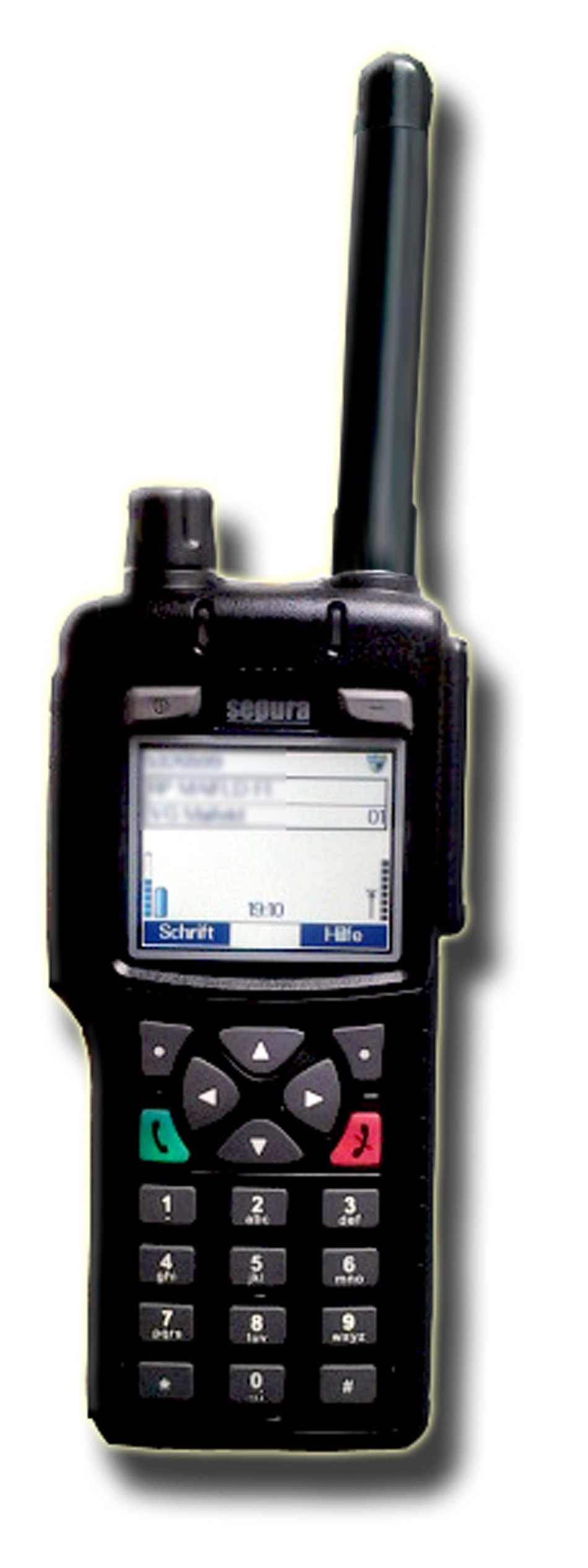
Land mobile station, here: walkie-talkie

Land mobile station (or land mobile radio station) is a mobile radio station in the land mobile service that operates within a country or continent.

Each station is classified by the service in which it operates permanently or temporarily.

== References / sources ==
- International Telecommunication Union (ITU)
