= SCR-68 =

World War I US Army Signal Corps' radiotelephone

The SCR-68 (SCR was a military term meaning Set, Complete, Radio) was a military radiotelephone used by the US Army Signal Corps as an aircraft radio in the waning months of World War I. Due to its many problems, primarily its inability to communicate with other radios, like its ground component the SCR-67 or the larger truck mounted SCR-108, over large distances, the SCR-68 quickly became obsolete. Nonetheless, the SCR-68 was one of the first steps towards developing more effective messaging between pilots and commanders, even beyond military usage.

== Capabilities ==
The SCR-68 had a few distinct characteristics that separated the SCR-68 from other types of radio. The SCR-68 operated at 750 kHz (400 meter wavelength), using a long wire antenna reeled out behind the aircraft. It could receive and transmit messages over a maximum range of eighteen miles. The artillery observer (navigator) managed the SCR-68, receiving and relaying messages for the pilot. During World War I, most planes were two-person open-cockpit aircraft. Instead of communicating between themselves in the air, the pilot and the observer sent messages through the SCR-68 where the headphones would eliminate most outside noises. Like a private telephone line, the pilot and observer could communicate with each other; however, this action prevented the SCR-68 from receiving any transmissions.

== Problems ==
Advancements with the SCR-68 were marred by its flaws. Military tests by British soldiers reported the difficulty of getting the proper balance with the oscillating and control values. The SCR-68 range was reliable within a five-mile radius, a serious issue when the airplane needed to travel long distances. Another issue with the SCR-68 was the static noise that came from the “ripples” in the generator commutation. The noise was faint and was only considered a problem when receiving messages that exceeded 5 miles. It was later found that metal shielding placed around the wiring helped to prevent this problem.

== Origins ==
The US Army pushed for better technology to gain an advantage in World War I. The US Army asked private American companies to build a device that would establish better communication between military aircraft and themselves. Western Electric developed the SCR-68 that met qualifications: the radio was condensed to a size that could fit inside the airplane, simple for an Observer to use in flight, and the antenna would not drastically affect the movements of the aircraft. Another problem in the past included a communication device that eliminated the most disturbances from engine noise; the SCR-68 provided that by including a microphone and a sound-proof helmet. By the summer of 1918, approximately 3,000 units were manufactured and distributed to the US Army.

== Parts ==
=== Radio Set ===
Inside the suitcase-shaped box BC-11A was the circuit apparatus used for receiving and transmitting messages. The dials were used to control the frequency of the radio. The flip paddle switched the radio from receive to transmit and vice versa. The dimensions of the box were 17 inches by 10 inches by 7 inches and weighed 21 pounds.

=== Intercom ===
The BC-10 (SCR-57) intercom control box for switching between onboard communication and ground communication.

=== Antenna ===
The A-21 retractable antenna was located in the rear of the aircraft and was expanded by the air observer while in flight. It could reel out to 300 feet in length, was made out of two copper wires and weighed 19.5 pounds. Depending on the amount of antenna allowed behind the airplane, the antenna functioned at a wavelength of 750 kHz.

=== Generator ===
The GN-1 wind-powered generator was located on the braces of the landing gear, to gather adequate wind power and not hinder any other parts of the aircraft. The generator, as well as three 22.5 volt batteries located in the BC-11, provided a plate voltage at 300 volts and a filament voltage at 30 volts. The wind-powered generator was not very efficient, requiring the airplane to travel at fast speeds in order for the generator to work properly.

=== Other ===
• T-3 Single button Chest microphones for sending messages

• HS-1 Headphones, to eliminate external sounds

== See also ==
- Radiotelephone
- Air observer
- Navigator
- Signal Corps Radio
