= K-2 Lance wagon =

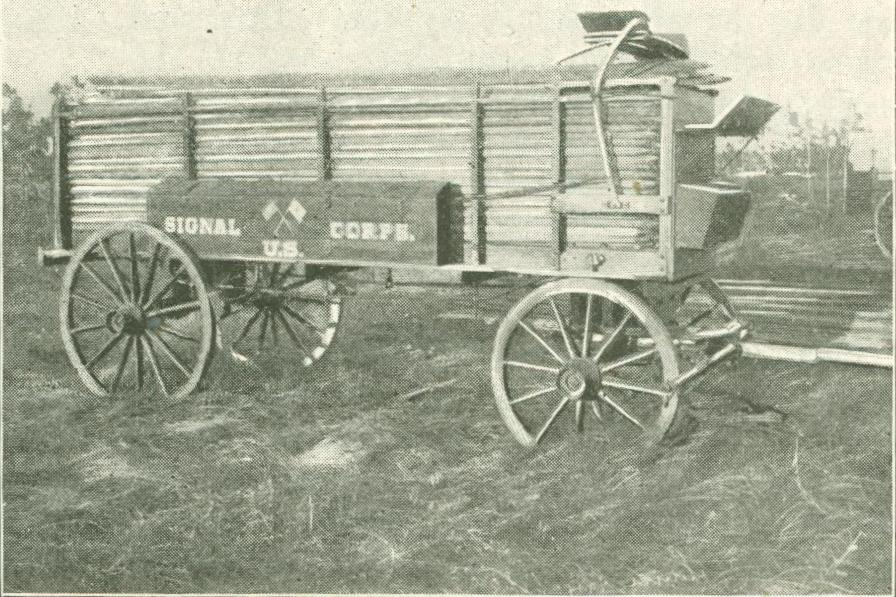
K-2 Lance wagon (truck) of the US Signal Corps to convey telephone or telegraph poles

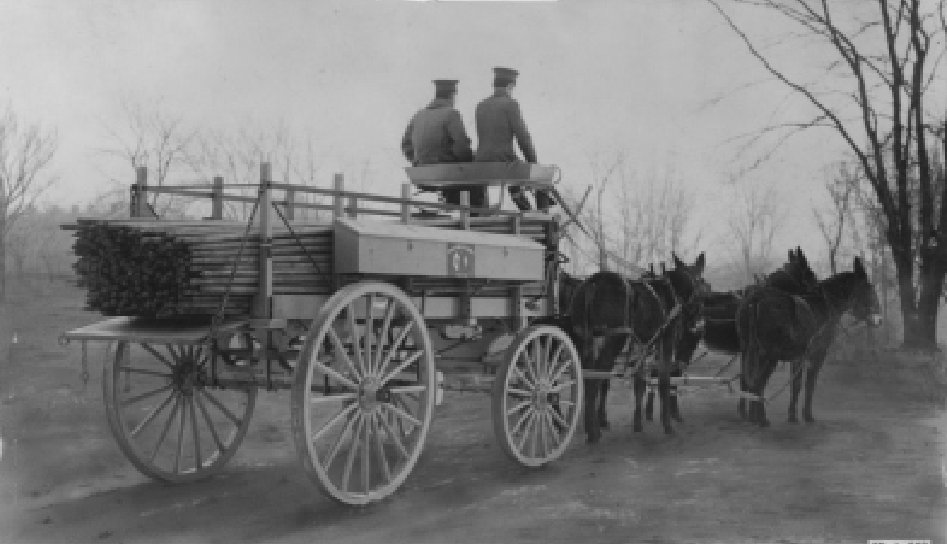
Back of the K-2 Lance Wagon with half a load of poles

The K-2 Lance wagon is a light wagon approximately 14 ft long, equipped with a high box body running its entire length, the body surmounted in front by a driver's seat; tool and supply containers are attached to either side of the box; proper re-enforcements are provided and suitable brakes are attached; rear wheel diameter 4 ft 8 in; gauge 4 ft 10 in; height of box body 3 ft 9 in; width of box body 3 ft 4 in.

The book "Electrical Instruments and telephones of the US Signal Corps" describes the Lance Wagon as "a wagon with a high seat and a long reach, suited for the transportation of lances 18 feet long. Four mules suffice for this load under ordinary conditions".

The Military Signals Manual 1918 page 196 says that the "Lance poles should never be used if any firmer line supports are available".

== See also ==
- List of Signal Corps Vehicles
- K-1 cart
- K-3 wire cart
- K-4 signal cart
- K-5 truck
- K-8 cart
