= K-3 cart =

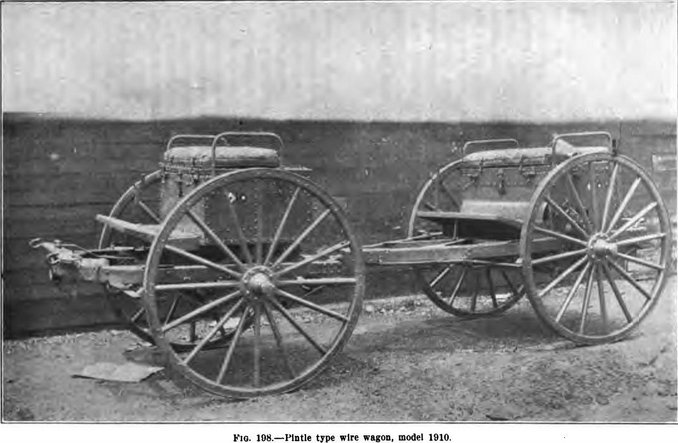
Pintle type wire wagon, model 1910

The K-3 cart is a 2-wheel, strongly constructed wire cart, similar to artillery caissons, but equipped for carrying and reeling out wire; used together with Signal cart, type K-4, to form the wagon formerly called "Pintle wire wagon, model 1910."

The image from Electrical instruments and telephones of the US Signal Corps 1911 is accompanied by the following text: "In the latest model the front element of the vehicle carries the reel and wire and is known as the reel cart. The rear element, known as the signal cart, is a chest of compartments suitable for carrying the buzzers, batteries, flags, field glasses and other equipment used by field companies of the Signal Corps. The rear signal cart may be detached from the reel cart and the former used alone in laying and recovering wire. The pintle type wagon is drawn by four horses. The signal cart chest can be moved forward and backward to adjust weight on the horses' necks".

== See also ==
- List of Signal Corps Vehicles
- K-1 cart
- K-2 Lance wagon
- K-4 signal cart
- K-5 truck
- K-8 cart
