= K-1 cart =

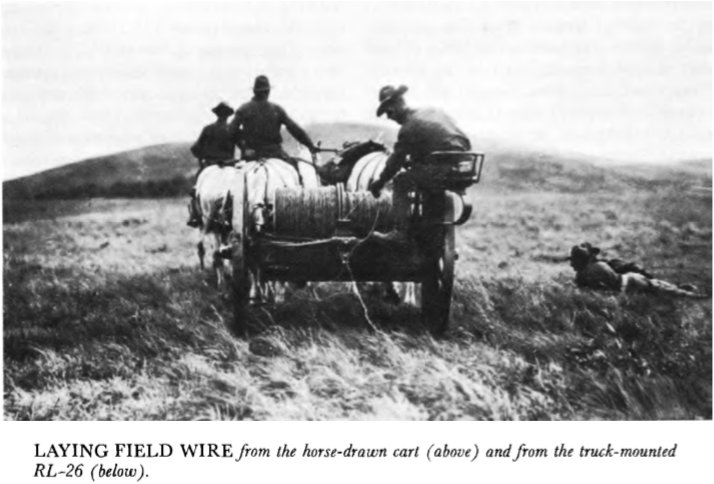
Laying wire from a K-1 cart, formerly known as Wire cart, type N

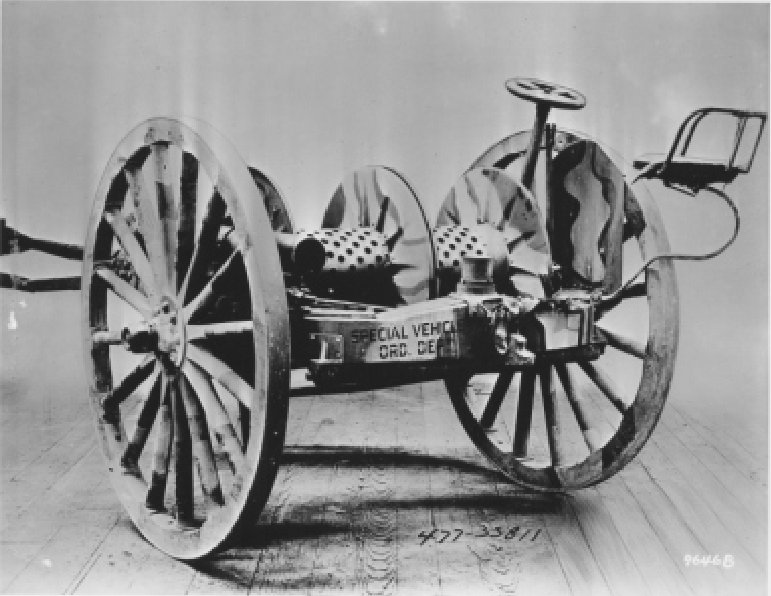
K-1 cart, formerly known as wire cart type N

The K-1 cart is a wire cart type K-1. It comprises a 2-wheel reel cart used for the rapid laying and recovering of telephone and telegraph lines in the field. It is completely equipped with a reel, mechanically rotated and controlled, 1 chest with wire-laying equipment, a driver's seat, and appropriate parts and fittings specially designed and used for only on this cart; designed to carry 5 miles of wire, type W-39. It was formerly known as "Wire reel cart, type N".

== See also ==
- List of Signal Corps Vehicles
- K-2 Lance wagon
- K-3 cart
- K-4 cart
- K-5 truck
- K-8 cart

== Notes ==
- 2) Electrical instruments and telephones of the US Signal Corps (1911)
- 3) Military Signal Corps manual (1918)
