= SCR-658 radar =

Radar introduced by U.S. army in 1944 to track weather balloons

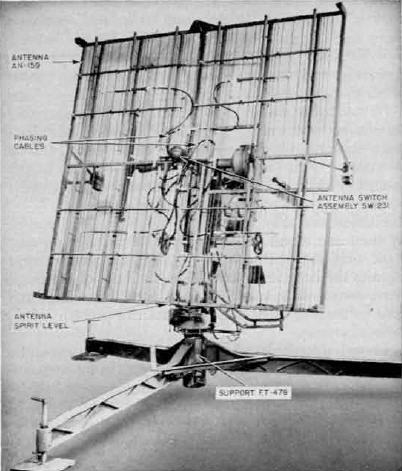
- SCR-658 radar
- Country of origin: USA
- Introduced: 1944
- Type: a radio- direction- finding device

The SCR-658 radar is a radio direction finding set introduced by the U. S. Army in 1944, was developed in conjunction with the SCR-268 radar. It was preceded by the SCR-258. Its primary purpose was to track weather balloons. Prior to this it was only possible to track weather balloons with a theodolite, causing difficulty with visual tracking in poor weather conditions. The set is small enough to be portable and carried in a Ben Hur trailer.

== Surviving examples ==
There is one known survivor at the Air Force museum in Dayton Ohio.

== See also ==
- Signal Corps Radio
- Radiosonde
