= Radio Tractor =

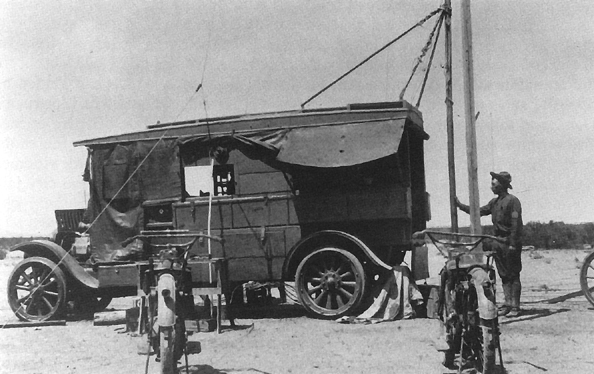
- Radio Tractor No. 3 on White Chassis
- Type: Radio truck
- Place of origin: United States

Service history
- In service: 1914-?
- Used by: US Army
- Wars: World War I

Production history
- Designed: 1914-?
- Manufacturer: FWD, White Motor Company
- Produced: 1914
- Variants: 3

Specifications
- Mass: 1 1/2 ton
- Crew: 7
- Armor: none
- Main armament: none

The Radio tractor was a mobile Signal Corps Radio used by the U.S. Army for ground communications before and during World War I. Prior to World War I, trucks were referred to as "tractors", and there were also telegraph tractors, and telephone tractors.

== Use ==
Very little information exists for these trucks, as most of the components were built before standardization. They first made their debut on the Mexican border in a radio intercept role, and later during World War I, some sets may have been reconfigured for RDF and other uses.

== Components ==
- SCR-50, 2 kilowatt spark transmitter, crystal or vacuum tube detector receiver, 0.15-0.50 Megahertz

== Variants ==
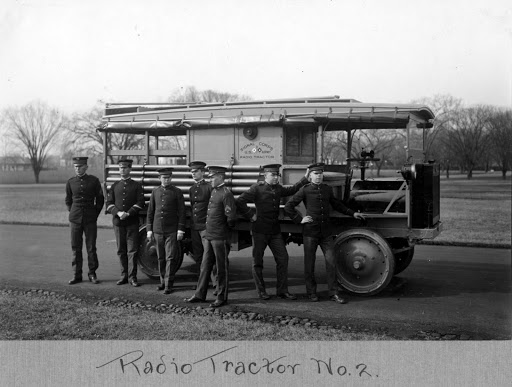
Radio Tractor No.2

At least 3 variants are known:

- Radio Tractor No. 1
- Radio Tractor No. 2 (Four Wheel Drive)(Jeffery Quad), Unknown radio set
- Radio Tractor No. 3 (White Motor Company), SCR-50 radio set

The No.3 truck was also accompanied by a tender "Maintenance truck No. 5" later renumbered as K-5.

== See also ==
- Signal Corps Radio
- SCR-108
- Crystal radio
- List of U.S. Signal Corps vehicles
