= K-8 cart =

The K-8 cart was a two-wheel horse-drawn cart used by the U.S. Signal Corps, designed for transporting in the field a large assortment of signalling equipment in the field. The cart's gauge is 5 ft 2 in, the wheel rims 2 1/2 inches wide, and the wheel diameters are 5 ft. The body of the cart consists of a large chest surmounted by a driver's seat which is 44 inches wide, 27 inches high, and 5 ft 4 in long. It is mounted upon commercial wagon springs, and the interior is equipped with partitions suitably arranged for separating and holding rigidly in place the parts of equipment, type SE-6.

== See also ==
- List of Signal Corps Vehicles
- K-1 cart
- K-2 Lance wagon
- K-3 cart
- K-4 cart
