= SCR-54 =

Crystal radio receiver

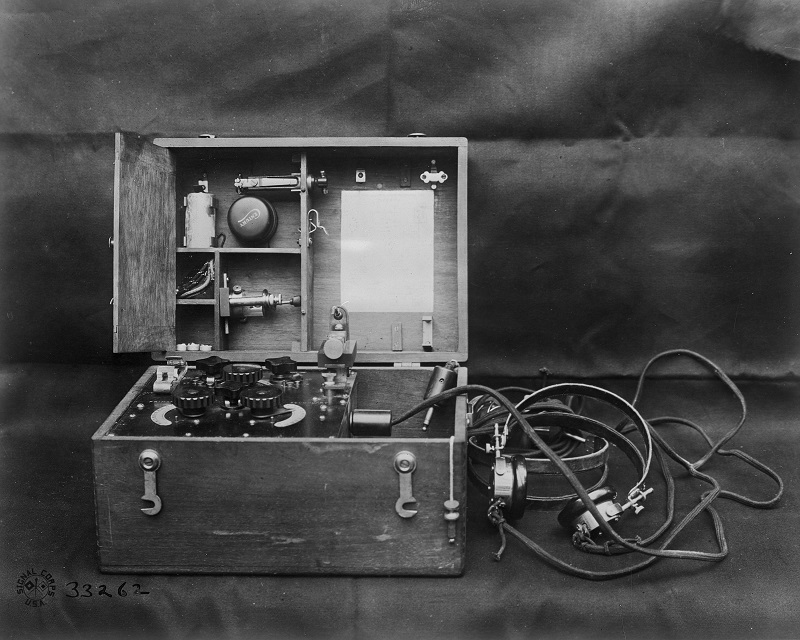
SCR-54 radio receiver

The SCR-54 was a tunable, portable crystal radio receiver used by the U.S. Army during World War I for fire control in conjunction with airplanes.

== History ==
French radio equipment was more advanced than that of the U.S. Army when the United States entered World War I. The U.S. Army therefore adopted French sets early on, and developed improved sets of their own, some based on French design. Several of the French A-1 artillery receiving set were sent to the American radio laboratory in the summer of 1917 and copied with minor modifications. It was first released as the AR-4 in limited numbers for field tests, supervised by Captain Edwin Armstrong. Several changes were made based on his suggestions. The receiver was redesigned and reissued as the SCR-54 (Set, Complete, Radio). Since there was high demand, several companies produced these sets or components, including DeForest Radio Telephone and Telegraph, Liberty Electric, Wireless Specialty Apparatus, Marconi, and General Radio.

== Specifications ==
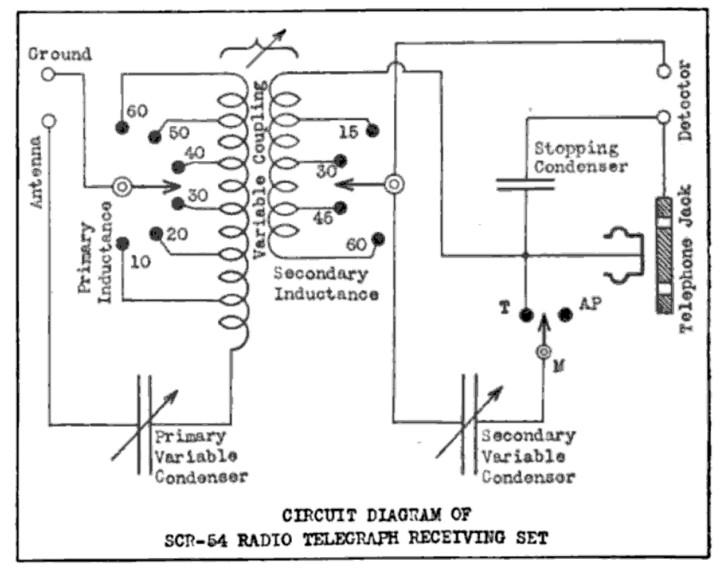
Schematic Wiring Diagram of the Type SCR-54 Set

Its primary (antenna) and secondary circuits were both tunable by variable capacitance and inductance. A crystal detector (Type DC-1) and telephone circuit were connected to the secondary circuit. It could receive wavelengths from 150–650 meters (460 to 2000 kHz). The receiver included two crystal (galena) detectors, one sealed in glass, and the other not, which were attached on the surface of the receiver. A buzzer circuit, powered by a BA-4 battery, was mounted in the box cover and used to adjust the crystal.

The set was compact and mounted in a wooden box, type BC-14. The lid of the box held the buzzer circuit, detectors, a screwdriver, two P-11 telephone headsets, spare parts, extra crystals, and an operating manual, “Radio Pamphlet No. 3”.

The receiver was intended to be used with antenna type A-2 or A-2-B.

== Vacuum Tube Detector ==
There was an optional vacuum tube detector, type DT-3-A, available for the SCR-54. It used a VT-1 vacuum tube powered by a BA-2 battery. The type number was originally SCR-55, later changed to DT-3, then DT-3-A. The crystal proved more popular in field use.

== SCR-54-A ==
The SCR-54-A featured electrical and mechanical improvements over the SCR-54. Most notably, the buzzer circuit was removed from the lid and incorporated into the chassis of the receiver proper.

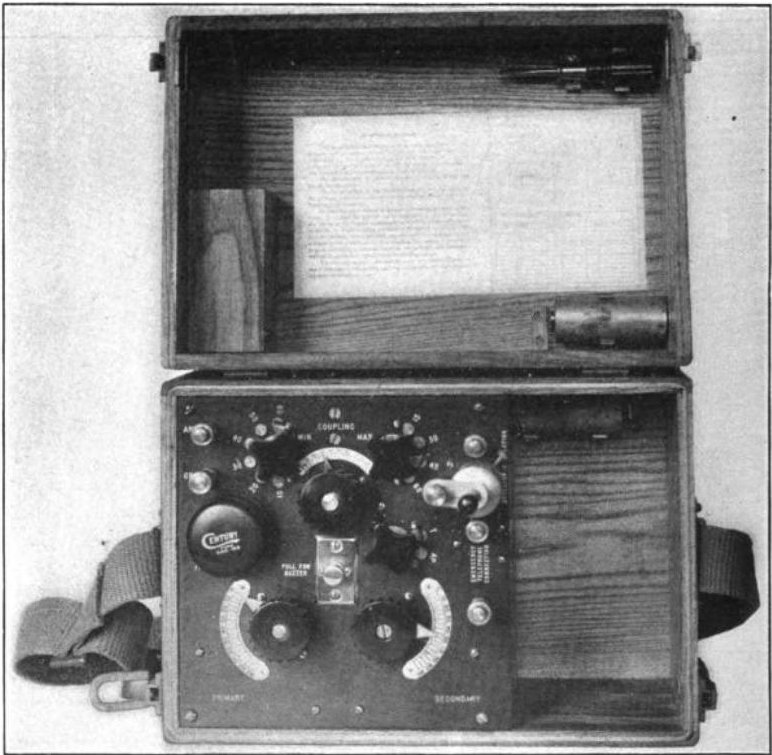
SCR-54-A

== Use ==
The SCR-54 was intended to be used at artillery stations to receive messages from fire control aircraft. Many were produced but relatively few reached the field before the war ended. Some were retained by the Signal Corps, but the bulk, most never used, were sold as surplus to the public, becoming a favorite of amateurs.
