= Yaesu VX series =

Radio transceiver

The Yaesu VX series is a line of two sequences of compact amateur radio handheld transceivers produced by Yaesu. There is a line of ultra-compact lower-power dual-band (2 m and 70 cm) transceivers that started with the VX-1R and was later updated with the VX-2R and VX-3R. There is also a line of 5 W tri-band transceivers that started with the VX-5R and was later updated with the VX-6R, VX-7R and VX-8R.

== Common features ==
The VX line of radios all have features common to most modern hand held amateur radios:

- CTCSS and DCS decode/encode and European tone burst
- RF squelch capability
- Selectable deviation (wide/narrow)
- DTMF transmission and memories

In addition, the VX line has features available on only some other brands:

- Receive coverage in AM, NFM, and WFM
- Wide-band receive coverage, from 500 kHz up to 999 MHz
- User-selectable 10 dB attenuator
- Ultra-compact size
- Channel memories (including frequency, CTCSS/DCS squelch tone and mode, repeater offset, alphanumeric labels)
- Frequency and memory scanning
- Display with automatic backlight
- Memory cloning interface, radio to radio or radio to pc and back
- SMA antenna jack

These features are specific to Yaesu radios:

- ARTS range transponder for watching communications between two ARTS-equipped radios
- WIRES - Internet repeater linking (added for VX-2 and after)

== Yaesu VX-1R ==
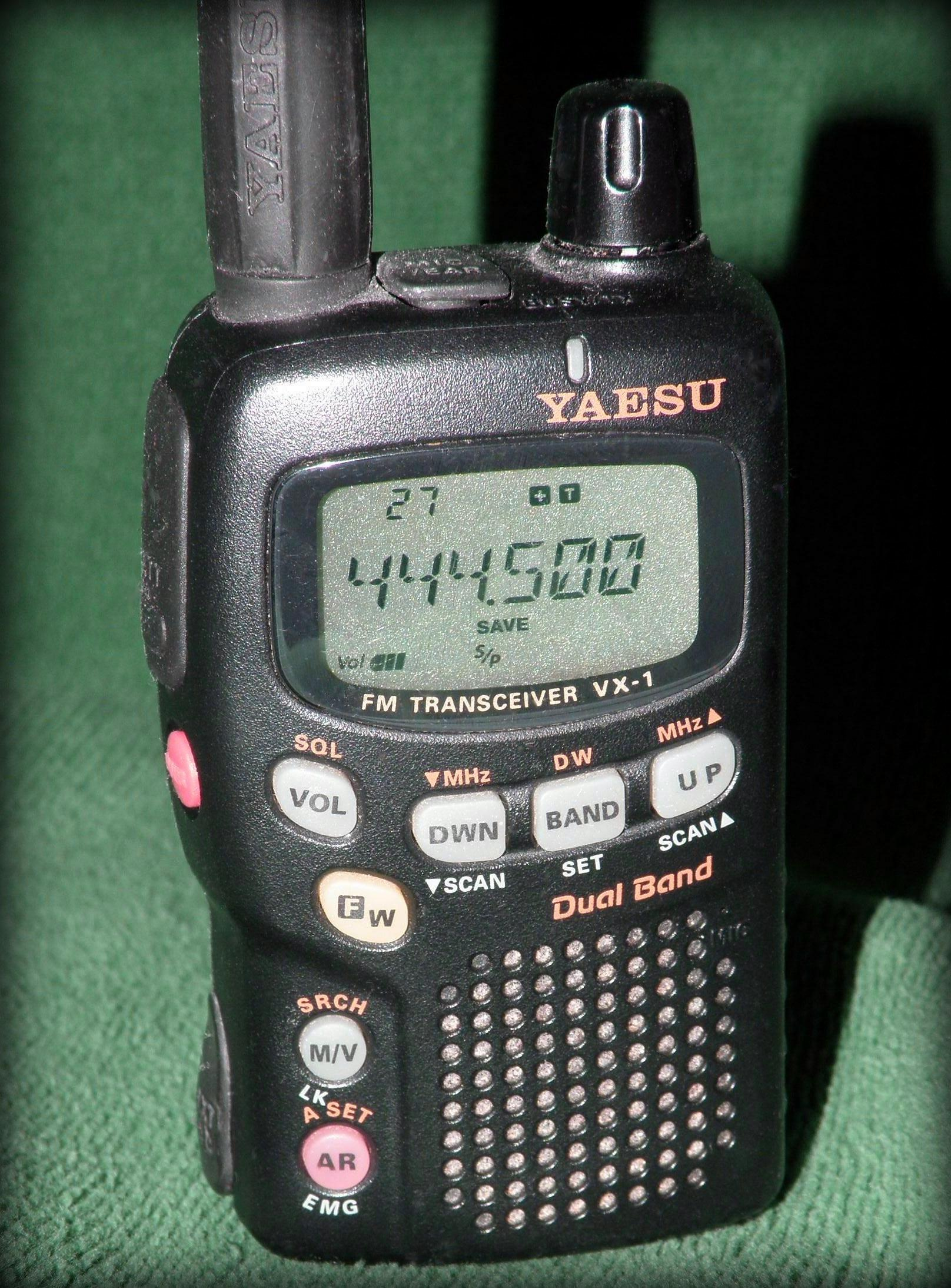
VX-1R

The Yaesu VX-1R is a micro-miniature multiband FM transceiver with extensive receiver frequency coverage intended for use in licensed "Ham" or amateur radio operations. It is purportedly the smallest UHF/VHF hand-held transceiver available, with dimensions of 4.7 × 8.1 × 2.5 cm (1.9 × 3.2 × 1.0 in). It will receive and transmit in both the 2 meter band (144-148 MHz) and the 70 cm band (430-450 MHz). The VX-1R provides receive coverage of the AM and FM broadcast bands, VHF and UHF TV bands, the VHF AM aircraft band, and a wide range of commercial and public safety frequencies.

=== Feature overview ===
- FM transmit on the 2-meter band and 70-centimeter band (1 watt @ 6 V EXT DC in and 500 milliwatts @ 3.6 V DC)

== Yaesu VX-2R ==
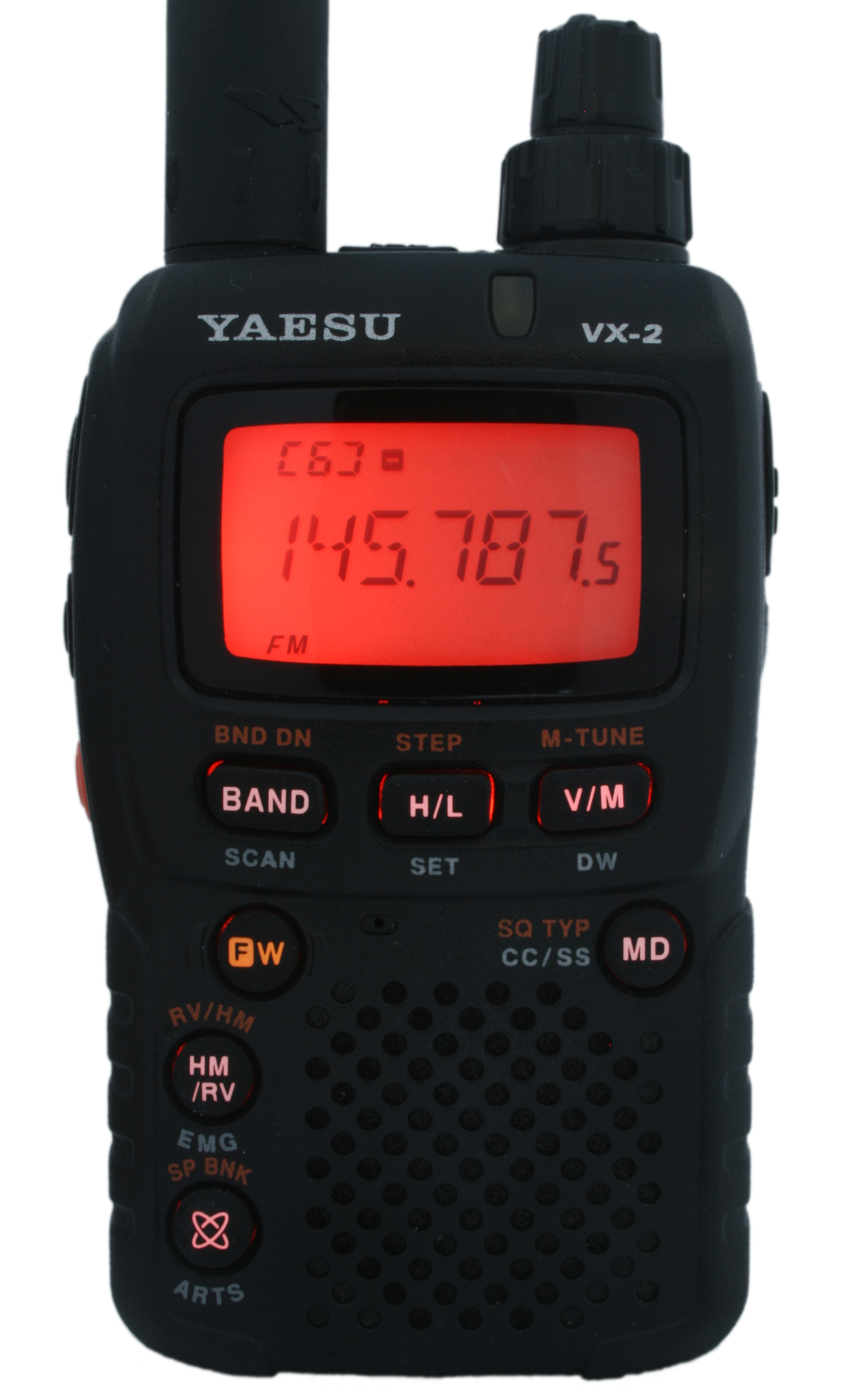
Yaesu VX-2E

The VX-2R was an ultra-compact amateur radio transceiver produced by Yaesu between 2003 and 2007.

The VX-2R is known as the VX-2E in European markets.

The Yaesu VX-1R was superseded by the VX-2R and is the model that preceded the Yaesu VX-3R.

=== Feature overview ===
- FM transmit on 2 Meters (1.5 watts) and 70 centimeters (1 watt) on battery power
- FM transmit on 2 Meters (3 watts) and 70 centimeters (2 watt) using external DC power
- Wide-band receive coverage, from 500 kHz through 999 MHz in AM, NFM and WFM modes
- Approximately 900 memory channels, with up to 20 banks

=== Battery ===
The standard battery will last about two days (single frequency receive) if not scanning. If scanning, the receive time falls to a few hours. At 1.5 Watts out, talk time is only about 20 minutes with a fully charged battery.

Replacement batteries are inexpensive, especially as they are based on the Fuji NP60 camera battery. The lower (100 mW) power setting is adequate for repeaters out to 20 miles or so, and allows longer talk time. This is a highly regarded HT based on its performance-to-size ratio.

=== Modification ===
The VX-2 is not difficult to modify. Because the radio uses software-based jumpers, it is not necessary to open the radio up to perform most modification. A MARS/CAP modification can be performed, expanding transmit coverage outside of ham bands slightly; it is also possible to perform a "freeband" modification to the radio, enabling transmission outside the authorized amateur radio bands, without any hardware modifications. Although in most cases illegal based on Federal Communications Commission rules, the "freeband" modification opens transmit coverage significantly, allowing use on business band and FRS bands, along with several lesser-used frequency bands.

== VX-3R ==
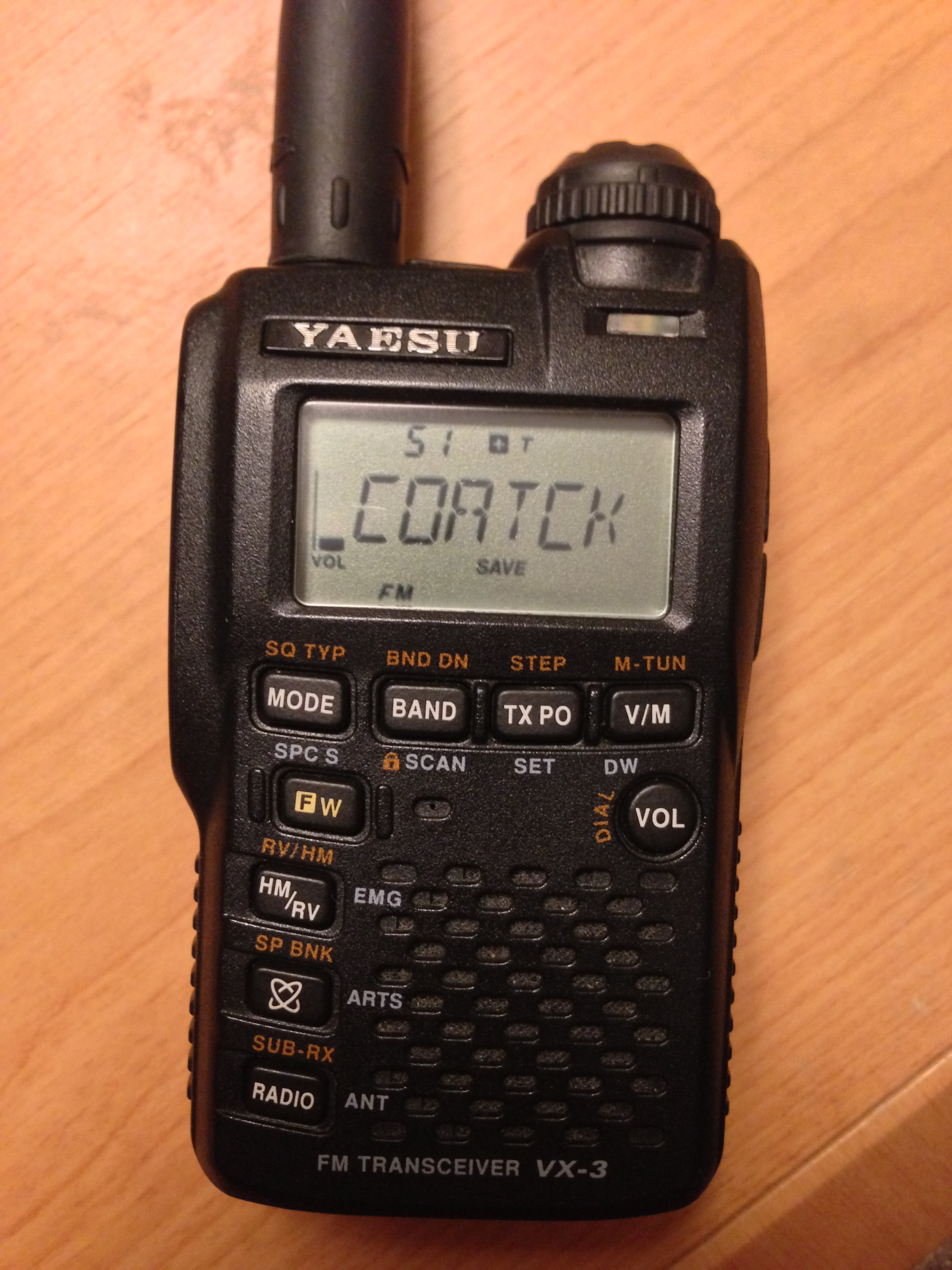
VX-3R

The VX-3R is an ultra-compact dual-band FM transceiver with extensive receive frequency coverage. Besides 144 and 430 MHz transceive operation, the VX-3R provides receive coverage of the AM(MF) and FM broadcast bands, HF Shortwave Bands, VHF and UHF TV bands, the VHF AM aircraft band, and a wide range of commercial and public safety frequencies. The transmitter section provides 1.5 watts of power output on the 144 MHz bands with the supplied FNB-82LI battery pack and 1 watt output on 430 MHz.

The VX-3R is the successor to Yaesu's previous models in the ultra-compact dual-band handheld FM transceiver segment, the VX-1R and the VX-2R.

=== Feature overview ===
- FM transmit on 2 meters and 70 centimeters at up to 3 watts on 2 m and 2 watts on 70 cm with a 6VDC external source (1.5 watts on 2 m and 1 watt on 70 cm when using the internal battery)
- 1000 mAh lithium-ion battery
- Internal ferrite bar antenna for AM broadcast reception
- Stereo decoding for FM broadcast reception
- Stereo headphone connector
- Ability to use headphones as antenna for FM broadcast reception

=== Modifications ===
- The VX-3R can be modified to transmit on MARS and CAP frequencies through hardware techniques; however, this radio does not meet NTIA standards for either MARS or CAP. The hardware modification requires the removal of an SMD located under the battery pack. It is capable of being programmed by the open-source Chirp software.

== VX-5R ==
The VX-5R is an ultra-compact amateur radio transceiver produced by Yaesu.

=== Feature overview ===
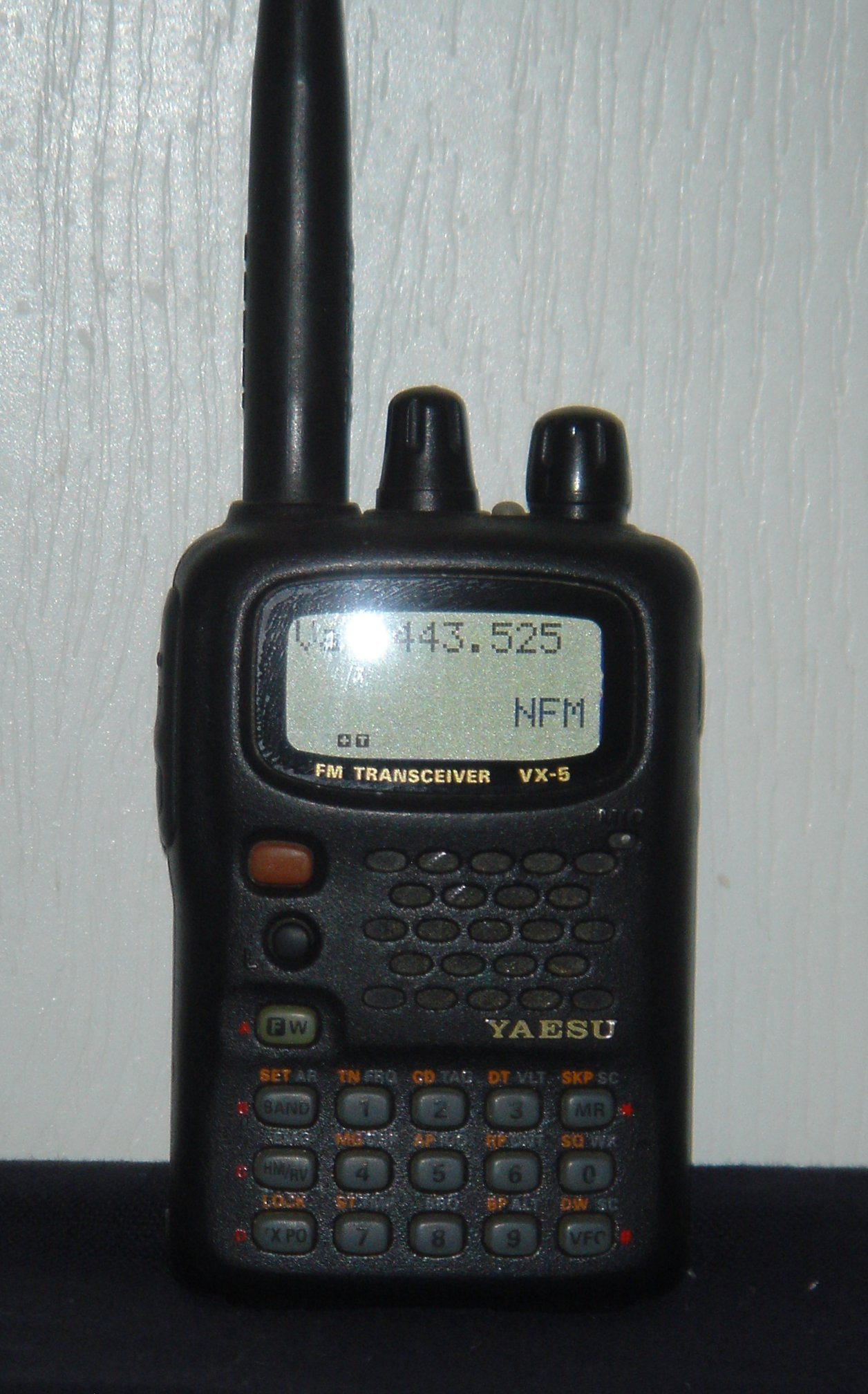
Yaesu VX-5R

- FM transmit on 6 meters, 2 meters and 70 centimeters (5 watt @ 13.8 V EXT DC IN), (5 watt @ 7.2 V 50 MHz/144 MHz), (4.5 watt @ 7.2 V 430 MHz)

=== Specifications ===
(Source: Yaesu)

- Receiver frequency range:
  - 0.5 – 16 MHz
  - 48 – 729 MHz
  - 800 – 999 MHz (cellular blocked)
- 6M TX: 5 watts
- 2M TX: 5 watts
- 440 MHz TX: 4.5 watts
- Number of simultaneous bands: 1
- Priority channel: 1 – any of 220
- Backlight: red
- Memory channels: 220
- Alpha tags in display: 8 characters
- Battery: 1100 ma li-ion (superseded by current 1500 ma li-ion)
- Battery life (avg): 6 to 12 hours
- Alkaline pack: 2 AA cells (optional)
- Computer programmable with ADMS/EVE/VX5 commander
- Weight: 9.0 oz
- Charge time: 6 Hrs
- Color: black, silver
- Audio output: 400 mW @ 8 O

== VX-6R ==
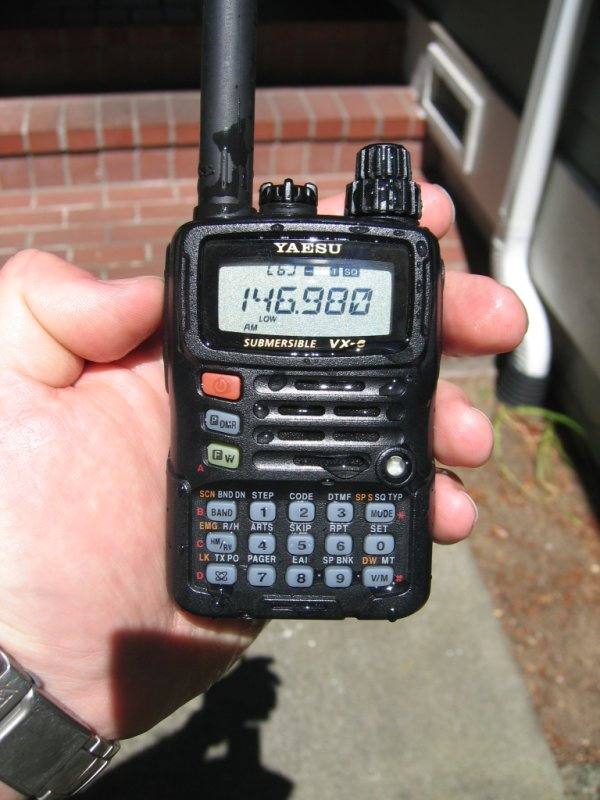
A Yaesu VX-6R tuned to a local 2 m repeater

The Yaesu VX-6R is a triple band handheld amateur radio transceiver with extensive receive coverage, and leading-edge features. The radio is designed to operate in extreme conditions, and is sealed at all openings to permit underwater submersion up to 1 meter (3 feet) for 30 minutes. A demo model at Dayton Hamvention was held underwater for 8 hours at 1 meter depth, under power, without adverse effects. Available accessories include remote microphones and earphones.

Category	Amateur radio
Class	Hand-held
Bands	VHF: 1.25 m (USA only), 2 m UHF: 70 cm
Rx	AM/FM: 0.500-999.998 MHz (USA cellular blocked) AM/FM: 0.504-999.998 MHz (exp. version)
Tx	FM: 144-148 MHz, pwr: 0.3 W, 1.0 W, 2.5 W, 5.0 W FM: 222-225 MHz, pwr: 0.2 W, 0.5 W, 1.0 W, 1.5 W FM: 430-450 MHz, pwr: 0.3 W, 1.0 W, 2.5 W, 5.0 W
Power	7.4 VDC (internal li battery), 5-16 VDC (external), negative ground (outside), inside pin is (+)
Dimensions (HxWxD)	89 mm × 58 mm × 29 mm
Weight	277 g (including battery)
First released	2005

=== Features ===
- 900 memories
- Adjustable backlit keypad & LCD
- Channel counter function for locating frequency of nearby transmitter

=== Accessories ===
With the shipped box, Yaesu VX-6R should come with the following accessories:

- VX-6R, transceiver
- FNB-80LI, 7.4 V, 1400 mAh lithium ion battery pack
- NC-72B/C, 5 hour battery charger
- YHA-67, antenna
- Belt clip & hand strap
- Operating manual
- Warranty card

There is an optional barometric module, SU-1, that provides both barometric pressure and altitude measuring capability, and the VX-6R may be programmed to monitor temperature and pressure (or altitude) while it is turned off. This user-installed accessory mounts under the battery compartment.

=== Specifications ===
Frequency range of transmission (US version):

- 222 - 225 MHz – 1.5 W max
- 144 - 148 MHz – 5.0 W max
- 420 - 450 MHz – 5.0 W max

 40  - 80     MHZ  TX 0.5 W-1 W-0.1 W max - special HF mode range for VX-6E rev c2 switch setting HF mode O I I O I 0 0 0

Each band (except 222 MHz and 50 MHz in Asia exported version) can be switched between 5 W, 2.5 W, 1.0 W, and 300 mW.

The Asian version of the VX-6R can transmit a 1.5 W FM carrier on the six-meter band. It is necessary to use an external antenna tuned to the lower part of the six meter band for this feature. (A 2-sectional antenna is provided with the Asian export version.)

=== Technical description ===
==== Faults and problems ====
A bug has been found, as the CTCSS decode may not work properly when the VX-6R is operating with external power.

The VX-6R may become insensitive to narrow-band FM signals – see the VX-7R sensitivity issue below.

== VX-7R ==
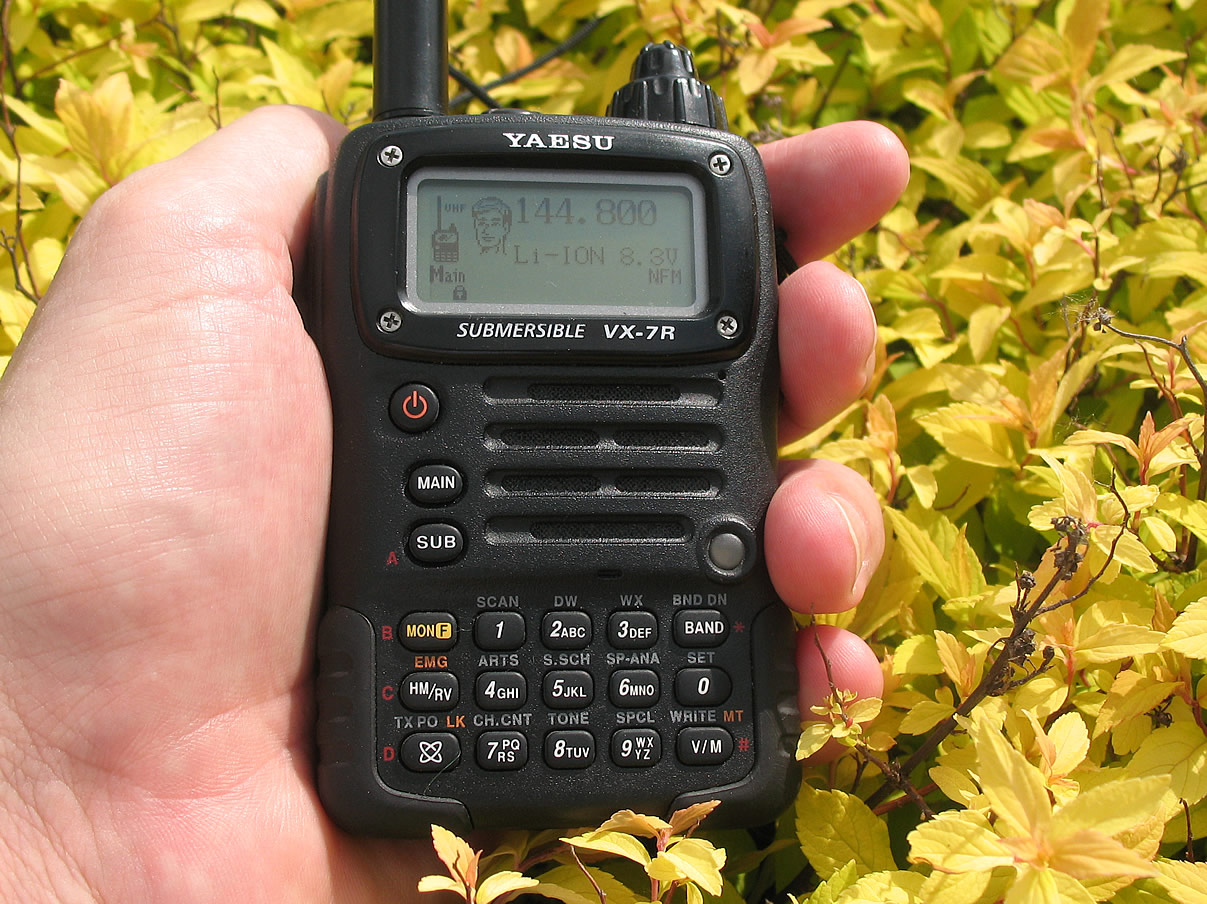
YAESU VX-7RB

The Yaesu VX-7R is a discontinued handheld transceiver for use on the amateur radio bands. It is a quad-band transceiver, capable of transmitting and receiving on the 50 MHz (6 meters), 220 MHz (1.25 meters), 144 MHz (2 meters) & 440 MHz (70 centimeters) bands. It also features a general-coverage receiver, meaning it can operate as a receiver on many additional bands. The radio's magnesium alloy case is available in black anodized or silver (clear anodized). The model number suffix "B" or "S" denotes which color, black or silver respectively.

The radio is designed to operate in extreme conditions. It is designed to be shockproof, and is sealed against water and chemicals, making it well-suited for emergency-services duty. Available accessories include remote microphones, earphones, barometric pressure sensor module, and adapters for digital communications modes.

=== Feature overview ===
- 900 memories
- Wideband receiver, 500 kHz - 999 MHz (the US version has cellular telephone frequencies blocked)
- True user-selectable dual receive
- Backlit keypad & LCD
- Sensors for temperature, voltage (internal battery or external power source), real-time clock, and barometric pressure (optional module)
- User-definable icon images for bands, S-meter glyphs and font characters
- Waterproof (3 foot depth for 30 minutes)
- 132 × 64 pixel back-lit dot matrix display

=== Selected specifications ===
Receive:

Specified	Actual (U.S. version)	VFO availability
0.5 - 1.8 MHz (BC band)	0.510 - 1.795 MHz	Main
1.8 - 30 MHz (shortwave band)	1.800 - 29.995 MHz	Main
30 - 59 MHz (6-meter band amateur)	30.000 - 58.995 MHz	Main, sub 50.000-53.995 MHz
59 - 108 MHz (FM/TV-VHF Lo)	59.000 - 107.900 MHz	Main
108 - 137 MHz (airband)	108.000 - 136.975 MHz	Main
137 - 174 MHz (2-meter band amateur)	137.000 - 173.995 MHz	Main and sub
174 - 222 MHz (TV-VHF Hi)	174.000 - 221.995 MHz	Main
222 - 225 MHz (1.25-meter band amateur)	222.000-224.995 MHz	Main
225 - 420 MHz (ACT1: Action Band 1)	225.000 - 419.995 MHz	Main
420 - 470 MHz (70-centimeter band amateur)	420.000 - 469.995 MHz	Main and sub
470 - 729 MHz (TV-UHF)	470.000 - 728.995, 758.000-773.995 MHz	Main
800 - 999 MHz (cell-blocked)	803.000 - 823.995, 849.000 - 868.995, 894.000 - 914.995, 944.000 - 959.995, 989.000 - 998.995 MHz	Main

Frequency range transmit:

- 50 - 54 MHz – 5 watts FM / 1 watt AM
- 144 - 148 MHz – 5 watts
- 222 - 225 MHz – 300 mW (US version)
- 430 - 450 MHz – 5 watts

Output power on each band (except 222 MHz) can be reduced from 5 watts to 2.5 watts, 1 watt, or 50 milliwatts (on 222 MHz, can be reduced from 300 milliwatts to 50 milliwatts). Reducing output power allows the transceiver to be used over shorter communication distances for longer battery life.

=== Characteristics ===
The VX-7R can transmit in AM at a 1 watt carrier power on the six meter band. This mode of operation allows the VX-7R to be used to drive a combination of bands functions reasonably well. The "Sub" VFO is limited to frequencies around the 50, 144, and 440 amateur bands, while the "Main" VFO has a much broader frequency coverage.

=== Modifications ===
- The VX-7R can be modified to transmit on MARS and CAP frequencies through both hardware and software techniques. However, this radio does not meet NTIA standards for either MARS or CAP. The hardware modification requires the removal of small solder contacts located under the battery pack. The software modification can be made with the VX Commander software through a data interface cable. Both modifications obtain the same result, except that the software modification will be disabled if the radio is hard-reset.
- Soon after the release of the VX-7R a design flaw was discovered related to the radio's waterproof housing. Due to the watertight housing of the radio, it was also airtight. This resulted in a pressure differential between the inside of the radio and the atmosphere, caused by changes in barometric pressure or altitude. This pressure differential prevented proper oscillation of the speaker diaphragm, resulting in reduced and muffled audio output. Yaesu remedied the problem by adding a small valve under the bottom left rubber armor, which allows equalization of the interior pressure with the atmosphere. The design change was reflected in all new radios produced from that point on, and any older radios sent in for repair are retrofitted with this modification.
- Some VX-7R owners complained of poor microphone sensitivity, which resulted in low audio levels on transmit. A crude modification was developed by end-users to solve the problem, at the expense of sacrificing the radio's waterproof capability. If small holes are pierced in the rubber seal covering the microphone diaphragm, then sound waves can better reach the microphone diaphragm, resulting in better audio sensitivity.[2]
- The VX-7R is capable of being programmed with the open source Chirp software.

== VX-8/VX-8D/VX-8G ==
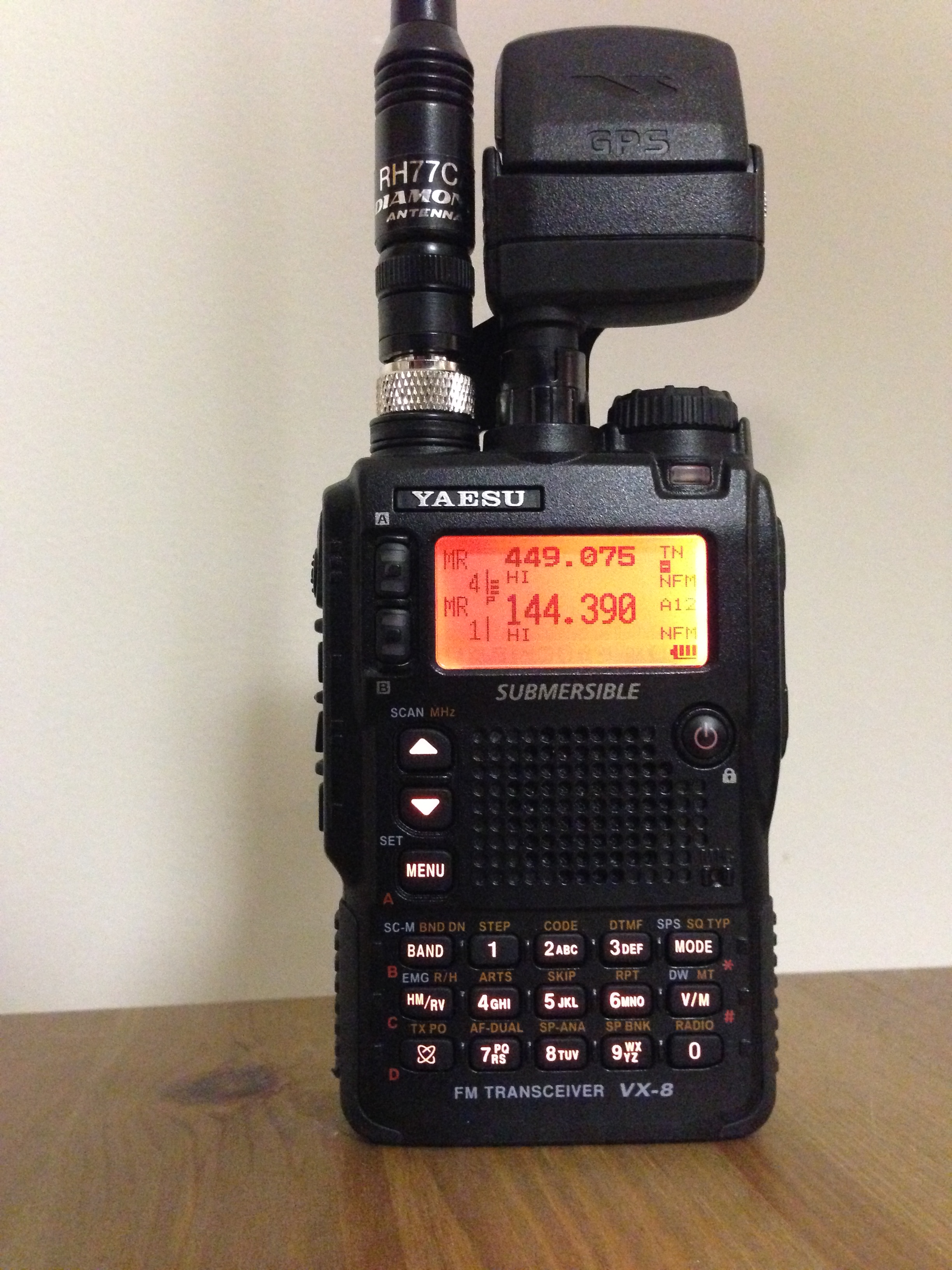
VX-8R with optional GPS module installed

The Yaesu VX-8R/VX-8E is a discontinued handheld transceiver (or "HT") for use on popular VHF and UHF amateur radio bands. It is a quad-band transceiver with dual VFOs, providing 5 watts FM on 50/144/430 MHz and 1.5 watts on 222 MHz. Models ending with an -R were manufactured for use with the North American band plan (American models featuring the 800 MHz cellular band blocked), and models ending with -E were made for use in Europe. It was made in various slightly different forms by Yaesu/Vertex Standard until 2017

The radio was designed to be semi-waterproof and shock-resistant, and is "designed to meet commercial grade standards". It includes a broadcast band AM/FM radio as well as AM-only shortwave listening capabilities. Its reception range is 500 kHz to 999.990 MHz. Available accessories include hand microphones, earphones, a GPS receiver, a bluetooth unit, a barometric pressure sensor module, and adapters for digital communications modes.

The VX-8 was eventually replaced by the also-discontinued VX-8D(-R/-E). The VX-8D was an "APRS enhanced" version of the VX8R, which included expanded capabilities and more device memory.

The also-discontinued VX-8G was yet another model in the family which included a built-in GPS module from the factory, and was intended to be used by the "Devoted APRS user."

The VX-8 family is able to be programmed using the free, open-source CHIRP software.
