= 12BV7 =

Class of medium-low gain, pentode vacuum tube amplifiers

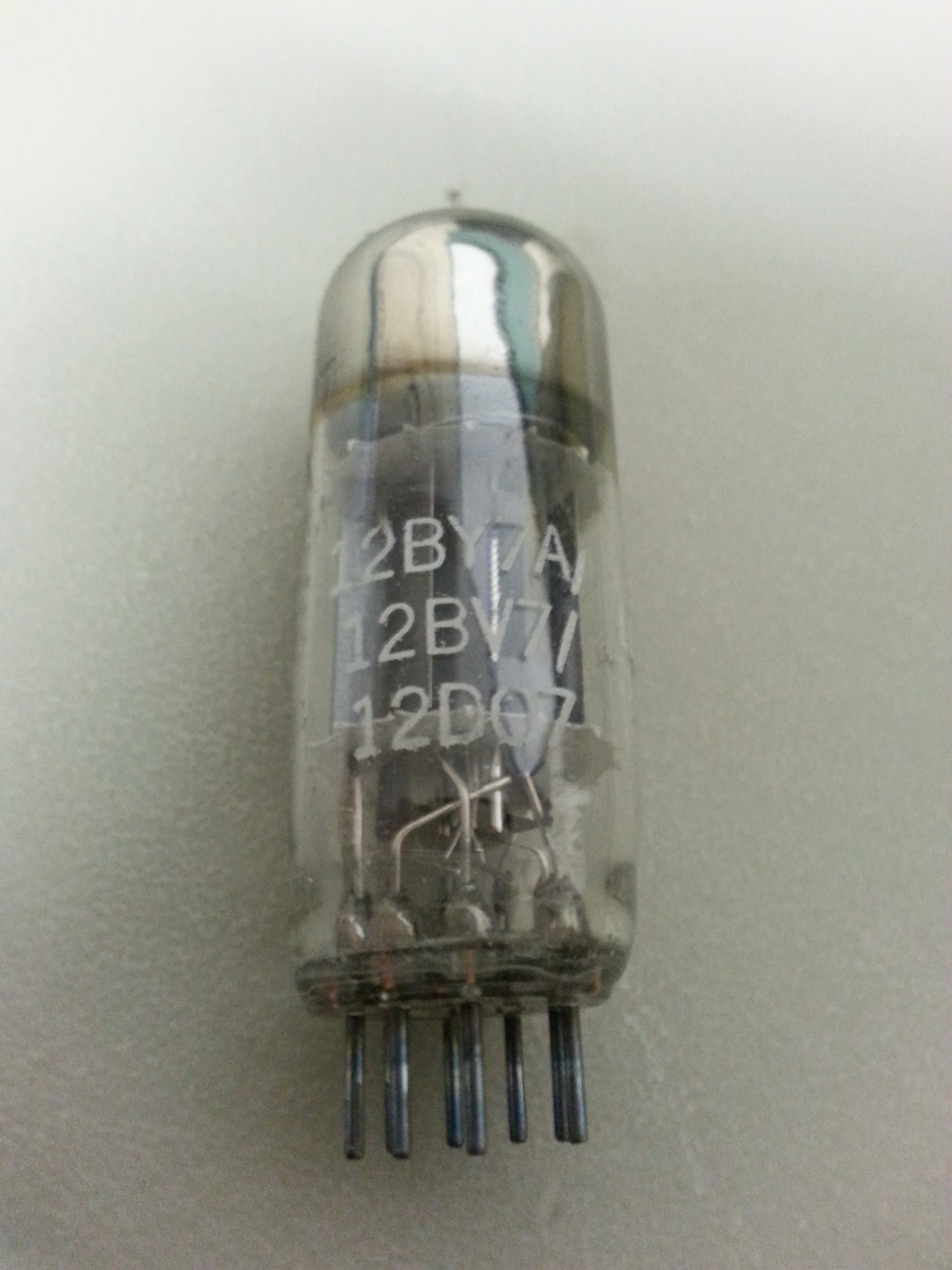
- General Electric 12BY7A vacuum tube (note equivalency markings)
- Classification: Pentode
- Service: TV & Radio
- Height: 2 5/8 in (67 mm)
- Diameter: 7/8 in (22 mm)

Cathode
- Cathode type: Indirectly Heated (Coated Unipotential)
- Heater voltage: Series / Parallel; 12.6 V / 6.3 V
- Heater current: Series / Parallel; 300 mA / 600 mA

Anode
- Max dissipation Watts: 6.5 W
- Max voltage: 300 V

Socket connections
- 9BF Pin 1, Cathode; Pin 2, Grid 1 Pin-3, Internal Shield / Grid 3 (Suppressor); Pin-4, Heater; Pin-5, Heater; Pin-6, Heater Center Tap; Pin-7, Plate; Pin-8, Grid 2 (Screen) Pin-9, Internal Shield / Grid 3 (Suppressor)

Typical class-A amplifier operation
- Amplification factor: 28.5
- Anode voltage: 250 V
- Anode current: 26 mA
- Screen voltage: 180 V

References
- http://www.datasheetarchive.com/12BV7-datasheet.html

The 12BV7, 12BY7, 12BY7A, and equivalents were a class of medium-low gain, pentode vacuum tube amplifiers using the Noval socket configuration. Although originally marketed as pentode tubes for use in early television receivers, they found additional uses in audio and radiotelephone equipment. The series shares the EIA 9BF pinout with a number of other miniature pentode tubes of the era.

The most successful tube in this series, 12BY7A was introduced by General Electric in June 1955 as a demodulated video signal amplifier for television receivers. Its design specifications called for linear gain along a wide bandwidth (approximately 4 MHz) with low transconductance (13 Millimhos (Millisiemens)) and high sensitivity. This combination of sensitivity, bandwidth and price lead to its popularity in audio amplification systems during the tube era.

== Functional equivalents ==
Like other vacuum tubes of US and Japanese manufacture, the RETMA tube designation system was used to designate identical tubes across different manufacturers. Any variations from the original electrical design specifications required a change to the tube designation code. As a result, a number of cross-reference resources exist. In some cases, multiple tube designation numbers were marked on the tube itself.

=== 12BY7 ===
12BY7 was an immediate successor to the 12BV7 and provided the same overall amplification values, but had slightly higher screen dissipation and voltage ratings. The tube exhibited slightly lower transconductance ratings (11 mS vs the original specification of 13 mS) as a result of this change.

=== 12BY7A ===
The most popular variant from the original 12BV7 was the 12BY7A. In this case, the A suffix is used to indicate a backwards-compatible revision to the original specification. Specifically, the heater filament had been redesigned to further protect it from the potentially damaging voltage spikes which were known to occur when the tube heater circuits were wired in series rather than parallel. All of the other design specifications, including warmup time, were identical to the 12BY7.

=== 12DQ7 ===
The 12DQ7 was the final backwards compatible update to the 12BV7. It offered higher maximum screen and plate voltages of 330VAC. The transconductance value was further reduced from 11 mS to 10.5 mS.

=== 7733 ===
The 7733 is listed as a premium version of the 12BY7A variant suitable for industrial or instrument service.

=== EL180 ===
This is the European Mullard–Philips tube designation number for the 12BY7A variant. The code breakdown is as follows:

- E = Heated Cathode - Heater voltage = 6.3VAC, 6.3VDC Parallel, 12.6VDC Series
- L = Type of Device = Power tetrode, beam tetrode or power pentode
- 180 = Noval socket, B9A pinout.

== Usage outside of television reception ==
=== High-fidelity audio equipment ===
Although intended for video signal pre-amplification, the relatively high Mu to bandwidth ratio of the 12BY7 and 12BY7A variants lead to their adoption in audio amplification equipment during the Hi-Fi era. There is some dispute in the audio community as to whether the 12DQ7 and 12BV7 variants are acceptable substitutes when discussing the psychoacoustics of various amplifiers.

- Harman Kardon Citation II - Utilized six 12BY7As (three per audio channel) as pre-amplifiers driving four KT88 tetrode final stage amplifiers (two per channel) in a push-pull configuration. When driven to 60 Watts, this configuration resulted in approximately 40 kHz of audio frequency bandwidth (18 Hz - 40 kHz) extending into the ultrasonic range.

=== Radio transceivers ===
The tube series' wide-bandwidth characteristics lead a number of manufacturers to utilize later variants, such as the 12BY7A as a transmit exciter and/or receive preamplifier in the RF stages of their radios. This RF design remained in use throughout the 1970s and early 1980s even as the other stages were replaced with Solid State components. Equipment using mixed tube & solid-state technologies came to be known as "Hybrid" or "Hybrid Solid State".

==== Partial list of amateur radio equipment manufacturers using the 12BV7, 12BY7A or equivalents ====
Gonset Communicator GC-105, G28
Trio (later Kenwood) - TS-520, TS-820, TS-530, TS-830, R-820
R.L. Drake Company - TR4, 2-NT
Yaesu Musen (later Yaesu) - FT-101, FT-200 (Also resold as the Henry Tempo One)
Side-Band Engineers - SBE-34
Hallicrafters - HT-37

=== Electronic Test Equipment ===
The Tektronix 555 Modular Oscilloscope utilized a total of six 12BY7 and 12BY7A tubes. Four 12BY7s were specified for the main chassis as vertical amplifiers for the CRT beams (V1014, V1024, V2014, V2024), and one 12BY7A each in the Type 21 and Type 22 time-base modules (V145)
