= 6 meter =

6 meter may refer to:

- 6-meter band, an amateur radio band
- 6 Metre, a type of sailboat
