= 8-meter band =

Amateur radio frequency band

The 8–meter band (40 MHz) is the lowest portion of the very high frequency (VHF) radio spectrum available for amateur radio use in some countries. The term refers to the average signal wavelength of 8 meters.

The 8–meter band shares many characteristics with the neighboring 6–meter and 10–meter bands. However, as it is somewhat lower in frequency, it does offer better propagation mechanisms via the F2 ionospheric layer. These mechanisms are normally seen at high frequency (HF); they do occasionally appear in the 6 meter band. However, sporadic E propagation, whereby radio signals bounce off ionized clouds in the lower E region of the ionosphere, is common on the band in summer.

== History ==
=== Early- to mid-20th century ===
The 8–meter band was made available 1925-1928 to amateur experimenters in the UK and Irish Free State, also a much wider 8–10 meter band was allocated to amateurs in Australia and Germany. Several tests with two portable stations were carried out during July–September 1927, under the auspices of the Q.R.P. Transmitters Society, operated by G.D. Abbott (6TA) and J.W. Mathews (6LL).

After World War II, from 1955-1959 the 8–meter band (38-40 MHz) was allocated to USSR amateurs. Using a special license, Michał Kasia (SP5AM) conducted experiments in the 38-40 MHz band in 1957. Contacts with radio amateurs from far Siberia broke a new distance record on this band.

For the International Geophysical Year on 4 October 1957 the Soviet Union launched Earth's first artificial satellite Sputnik 1 and set up to broadcast a beep on 20 and 40 MHz. Its signal was received and tracked by scientists and ham radio operators worldwide. A special permission of 38-40 MHz was issued to Club station SP5PRG in Poland. A beacon was operated at Yellowknife on 38.07 MHz.

AMS and other organizations encouraged the creation of networks of amateurs. Since 1957, radio amateurs have been systematically recording meteor reflections and other phenomena. Noted the ~36.2–37.5 MHz range (radar concentration/1959 ITU alloc. note, then RR 547, etc.), where the reflections were longer and stronger, it was also suitable for other ionoscatter types. This made possible to determine the intensity of MS and its recurrence patterns. All the obtained data were significant for scientific research.

Also conducted radio-propagation experiments, such as the IQSY (The International Year of the Quiet Sun) program (1964–1969) with the VL5SA beacon at Darwin operating on 32.85 MHz. These experiments were conducted in collaboration with amateur radio operators and the Radio Research Laboratories (R.R.L.) in Japan. There were also other experiments, such as the 34 MHz test from Okinawa.

=== Late 20th century ===
In 1988, the Australian Department of Communications granted VK6RO an experimental license for one year to transmit on two spot-frequencies (35.81 MHz and 41.75 MHz) for testing propagation paths, to assay trends of the maximum usable frequency (MUF) between 30 and 50 MHz. In March 1993 the European Radiocommunications Office (now ECC) of the CEPT launched Phase II of a Detailed Spectrum Investigation (DSI) covering the frequency range 29.7–960 MHz. The results were presented in March 1995. Regarding the Amateur Radio Service the DSI Management Team recommended (among other things) that frequencies in the vicinity of 40.68 MHz be considered for amateur propagation beacons. A secondary allocation to the amateur service is also appropriate.

At the same time NTIA published U.S. National Spectrum Requirements: Projections and Trends. Future spectrum requirements for the amateur and the amateur-satellite services were contained in responses to the Notice provided by ARRL and AMSAT including narrow spectrum allocations (e.g. five 50 kHz slots) in the 30-50 MHz range. As noted in the report, the requested narrow spectrum allocations for propagation tests need to be studied for compatibility with current users of the frequencies.

=== 21st Century ===
In 2018, Ireland allocated 30–49 MHz (9–7 m), which can be subdivided into 9 m, 8 m, and the prevalent 7 m ranges. These subbands or bands provide a useful basis for analyzing propagation characteristics. The International Amateur Radio Union (IARU) in Region 1 is currently encouraging member societies to try to obtain propagation beacon permissions at 40 MHz and 60 MHz. However any action on a CEPT or ITU allocation is considered premature and explicitly ruled out at this stage.

Allocations up to 2025
Date	Country	Call sign prefix	Frequency band	Allocation
June 1998	Slovenia	S5	40.660–40.700 MHz	40 kHz of spectrum allocated for beacons
February 2005	South Africa	ZS	40.675–40.685 MHz	10 kHz of spectrum allocated
July 2013	Slovenia	S5	40.660–40.700 MHz	40 kHz allocated to the amateur service
April 2018	Ireland	EI	40.000–45.000 MHz	5 MHz within the 30–49 MHz allocation has a band plan.
December 2020	Croatia	9A	40.660–40.700 MHz	40 kHz allocated by request
June 2023	Cayman Isl.	ZF	40.660–40.700 MHz	40 kHz allocated to the amateur service
August 2023	Belgium	ON	40.660–40.690 MHz	30 kHz allocated to class A radio amateurs
April 2024	Spain	EA	40.650–40.750 MHz	100 kHz allocated to the amateur service for a period of 18 months.
August 2024	Italy	I	40.660–40.700 MHz	40 kHz allocated to the amateur service up to December 31.

Range	Band	ITU Region 1	ITU Region 2	ITU Region 3
LF	2200 m	135.7–137.8 kHz		
MF	630 m	472–479 kHz		
MF	160 m	1.810–1.850 MHz	1.800–2.000 MHz	
HF	80 / 75 m	3.500–3.800 MHz	3.500–4.000 MHz	3.500–3.900 MHz
HF	60 m	5.3515–5.3665 MHz		
HF	40 m	7.000–7.200 MHz	7.000–7.300 MHz	7.000–7.200 MHz
HF	30 m^{[t2]}	10.100–10.150 MHz		
HF	20 m	14.000–14.350 MHz		
HF	17 m^{[t2]}	18.068–18.168 MHz		
HF	15 m	21.000–21.450 MHz		
HF	12 m^{[t2]}	24.890–24.990 MHz		
HF	10 m	28.000–29.700 MHz		
VHF	8 m^{[t3]}	40.000–40.700 MHz	—N/a	
VHF	6 m	50.000–52.000 MHz (50.000–54.000 MHz)^{[t4]}	50.000–54.000 MHz	
VHF	5 m^{[t3]}	58.000–60.100 MHz	—N/a	
VHF	4 m^{[t3]}	70.000–70.500 MHz	—N/a	
VHF	2 m	144.000–146.000 MHz	144.000–148.000 MHz	
VHF	1.25 m	—N/a	220.000–225.000 MHz	—N/a
UHF	70 cm	430.000–440.000 MHz	430.000–440.000 MHz (420.000–450.000 MHz)^{[t4]}	
UHF	33 cm	—N/a	902.000–928.000 MHz	—N/a
UHF	23 cm	1.240–1.300 GHz		
UHF	13 cm	2.300–2.450 GHz		
SHF	9 cm	3.400–3.475 GHz^{[t4]}	3.300–3.500 GHz	
SHF	5 cm	5.650–5.850 GHz	5.650–5.925 GHz	5.650–5.850 GHz
SHF	3 cm	10.000–10.500 GHz		
SHF	1.2 cm	24.000–24.250 GHz		
EHF	6 mm	47.000–47.200 GHz		
EHF	4 mm^{[t4]}	75.500 GHz^{[t3]} – 81.500 GHz	76.000–81.500 GHz	
EHF	2.5 mm	122.250–123.000 GHz		
EHF	2 mm	134.000–141.000 GHz		
EHF	1 mm	241.000–250.000 GHz		
THF	Sub-mm	Some administrations have authorized spectrum for amateur use in this region; others have declined to regulate frequencies above 300 GHz.		
[t1]	All allocations are subject to variation by country. For simplicity, only common allocations found internationally are listed. See a band's article for specifics.			
[t2]	HF allocation created at the 1979 World Administrative Radio Conference. These are commonly called the "WARC bands".			
[t3]	This is not mentioned in the ITU's Table of Frequency Allocations, but many individual administrations have commonly adopted this allocation under "Article 4.4".			
[t4]	This includes a currently active footnote allocation mentioned in the ITU's Table of Frequency Allocations. These allocations may only apply to a group of countries.			
See also: Radio spectrum, Electromagnetic spectrum
