= IRTS =

IRTS may refer to:

- Indian Railway Traffic Service
- Infrared Telescope in Space, a 1990s Japanese space telescope
- Intensive Residential Treatment Services
- International Radio & Television Society
- Irish Radio Transmitters Society
