= Gonset Communicator =

Vacuum tube VHF AM radio transceiver

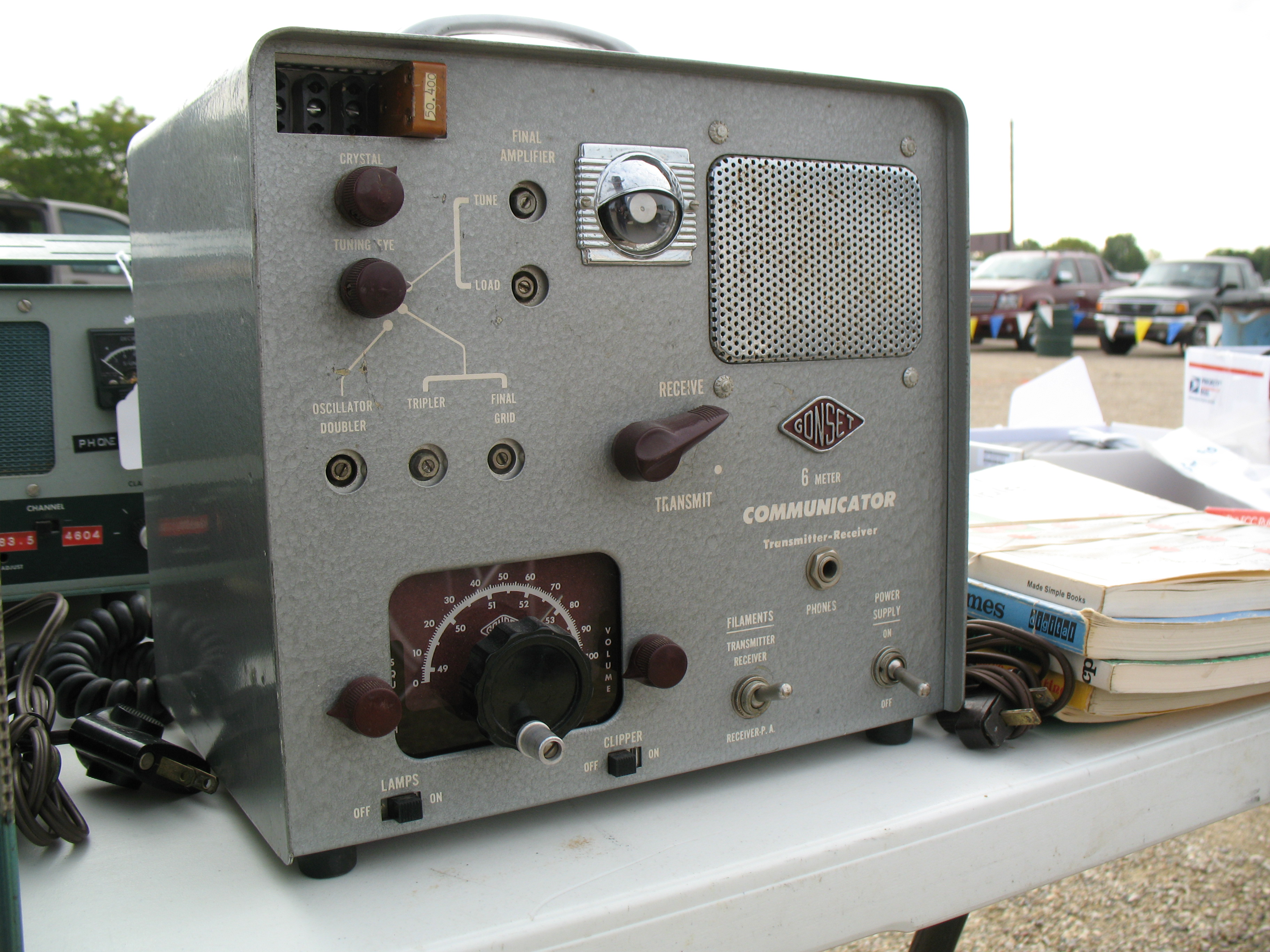
A Gonset Communicator for the 6 meter amateur band

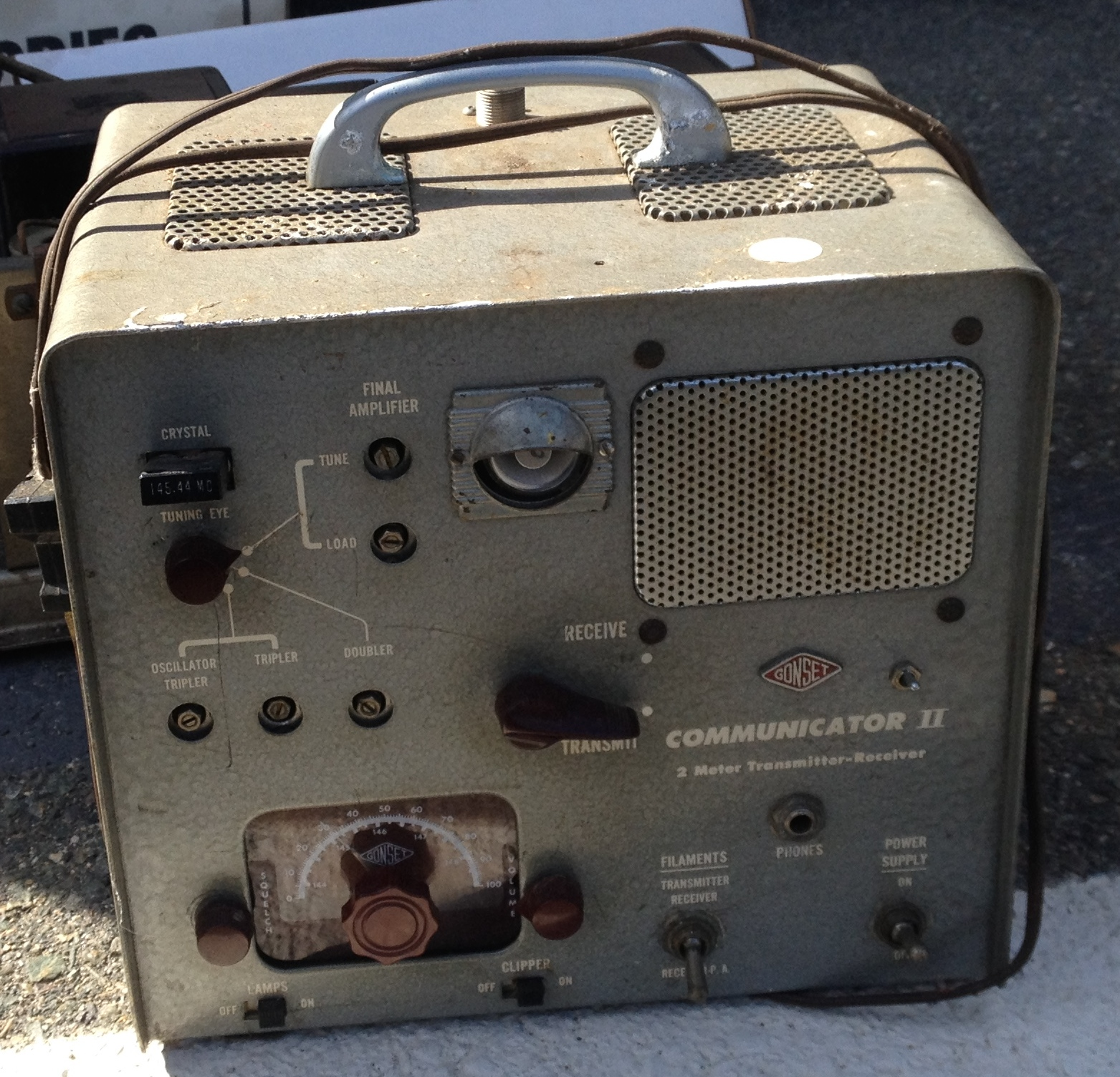
A 2 meter band Communicator II

The Gonset Communicator was a series of vacuum tube VHF AM radio transceivers that were widely sold in the 1950s and early 60s. They were designed by Faust Gonsett and manufactured by the Gonset Division of L. A. Young Spring and Wire Corp. Models were built for amateur radio, aircraft radio and U.S. Civil Defense use. The Gonsets were among the first commercial radios available for the post-World War II amateur bands and helped popularize VHF for amateurs.

The Gonset Communicators were packaged in a square box with a carrying handle and a UHF connector for the antenna on top, making them quite portable. Early models had a magic eye tube tuning indicator in front. The configuration earned them the name "Gooney Box." The radios could operate from 110 volt AC mains, or 6 or 12 volt DC from a car battery. A simple whip antenna could be plugged into the antenna connector on top. The transmit/receive switch was on the front panel, not the microphone. The Gonset could also be connected to an external speaker and used as a public address (PA) system.

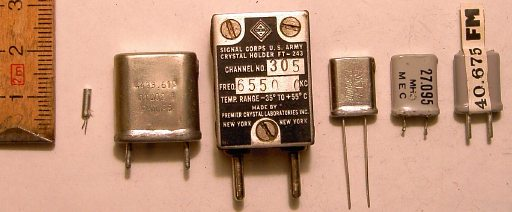
FT-243 crystal (center) of the type used with the Gonset Communicator.

The Gonset's receiver was manually tuned over the unit's frequency range with an analog dial, while the transmitter frequency was controlled by a crystal oscillator. The original model had a single jack on the front panel for an FT-243 style crystal. A chain of frequency multipliers allowed crystals in the 8 MHz range to be used. Many such crystals were available as military surplus in the 1950s. Later models had jacks for four crystals with a switch to select which one to use. Models were available for the 6 meter and 2 meter amateur bands, as well for as the VHF aircraft airband where they were often used as ground stations at smaller airfields. The civil defense model was painted yellow with CD insignia, and was available for the 6 and 2 meter bands. The 2 meter model was also used for the Civil Air Patrol, and could cover CAP frequencies which were adjacent to the 2 meter amateur band. A ten-meter model was also made.

The first model, introduced in the November 1952 QST Magazine, sold for $189.90. The model II, introduced in 1954 cost $230. It added the bank of transmit crystals and included knobs for the transmitter tuning controls, which required a screwdriver in the original. The model III was white and had a meter instead of the magic eye. The model IV switched to a lower profile package.

== Other amateur equipment ==
Contemporary with the Communicators, Gonset also made a full line of amateur equipment. Standouts were the converters and the G-76 transceiver. The converters enabled a car radio to pick up ham signals. The G-76 was among the first multiband HF transceivers. It pioneered the "station in a box" form factor that is common today (2018).
