= Sporadic E propagation =

Type of radio propagation

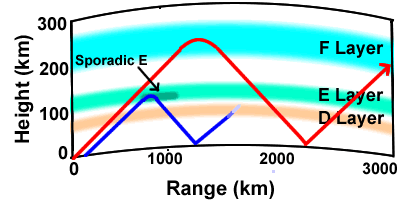
Ray diagram of sporadic E event

Sporadic E (abbreviated E_{s} or SpE) is an uncommon form of radio propagation using a low level of the Earth's ionosphere that normally does not refract radio waves above about 15 MHz.

Sporadic E propagation reflects signals off relatively small ionization patches in the lower E region located at altitudes of about 95–120 km (59–75 mi). The more conventional forms of skywave propagation in the ionosphere's higher F region refract off layers of electrons that are knocked off gas atoms and molecules by intense UV light, which are renewed on a regular repeating daily cycle. In both cases, the electrons, when present, refract (or "bend") radio signals back toward the Earth's surface creating a "bent pipe" path for radio signals.

The E_{s} propagation often supports occasional long-distance communication during the approximately 6 weeks centered on summer solstice at very high frequencies (VHF), which under normal conditions propagate mostly by line-of-sight.

== Overview ==
As its name suggests, sporadic E is an unpredictable event that can happen at almost any time; it does, however, display strong seasonal and diurnal patterns. Sporadic E activity peaks predictably near the solstices in both hemispheres. In the mid-latitude of the Northern Hemisphere, activity usually begins in mid-May, with the peak most noticeably beginning in early June. It begins trailing off after mid-July and becomes much less reliable by early August. A much smaller sporadic-E peak occurs during the winter solstice. For the mid-latitudes of the Southern Hemisphere, the timeframes are inversed; the highest activity occurring during their summer solstice.

Communication distances of 800–2,200 km (500–1,370 mi) can occur using a single E_{s} cloud. This variability in distance depends on a number of factors, including cloud height and density. The maximum usable frequency (MUF) also varies widely, but most commonly falls in the 25–150 MHz range. This includes the band II FM broadcast band (87.5–108 MHz), band I VHF television (former American analog TV channels A2–A6, Russian channels R1–R5, and former European analog channels E2–E4), CB radio (27 MHz), and the amateur radio 2 meter, 4 m, 6 m, and 10 m bands. On very rare occasions, a MUF of 225 MHz can be attained.

No conclusive theory has yet been formulated as to the origin of sporadic E. One theory involves the presence of wind shear forming mid-latitude E_{s} from vertical shears in the horizontal neutral wind. Scholars also attribute other factors such as diurnal and semi-diurnal tides. Attempts to connect the incidence of sporadic E with the eleven-year Sunspot cycle have provided tentative correlations. There seems to be a positive correlation between sunspot maximum and E_{s} activity in Europe. Conversely, there seems to be a negative correlation between maximum sunspot activity and E_{s} activity in Australasia. Harrison implies that there is a correlation between the formation of sporadic E and iron/magnesium micrometeoroid ablation in the ablation zone, 100 to 140 km (62 to 87 mi) above the earth surface. Maruyama discusses this possibility further.

== Characteristic distances ==
Television and FM signals received via sporadic E can be extremely strong and range in strength over a short period from just detectable to overloading. Although polarisation shift can occur, single-hop E_{s} signals tend to remain in the original transmitted polarization. Long single-hop (900–1,500 miles or 1,400–2,400 kilometres) sporadic E television signals tend to be more stable and relatively free of multipath images.

Shorter-skip (400–800 miles or 640–1,290 kilometres) signals tend to be reflected from more than one part of the sporadic E layer, resulting in multiple images and ghosting, with phase reversal at times. Picture degradation and signal-strength attenuation worsens with each subsequent sporadic E hop.

Sporadic E usually affects the lower VHF band I (TV channels A2–A6, E2–E4, and R1–R5) and band II (88–108 MHz FM broadcast band). A 1945 FCC engineering study concluded that E_{s} caused interference issues 1% of the time for a station broadcasting at 42 MHz, but only 0.01% for one at 84 MHz.

The typical expected distances are about 600 to 1,400 miles (970 to 2,250 km). However, under exceptional circumstances, a highly ionized E_{s} cloud can propagate band I VHF signals down to approximately 350 miles (560 km). When short-skip E_{s} reception occurs, i.e., under 500 miles (800 km) in band I, there is a greater possibility that the ionized sporadic E cloud will be capable of reflecting a signal at a much higher frequency – i.e., a VHF band 3 channel – since a sharp reflection angle (short skip) favours low frequencies, a shallower reflection angle from the same ionized cloud will favour a higher frequency. In this case even E_{s} DVB-T reception might be possible if a MUX uses VHF band 3, preferably channel E5, especially if QPSK mode is used, due to its low signal requirements. In addition to that, band 3 signals are more affected by tropospheric propagation which may indirectly increase the actual MUF because the signals only need to be refracted to low enough elevations that they get refracted towards the ground by the troposphere.

=== Equatorial sporadic E ===
Equatorial sporadic E is a regular daytime occurrence over the equatorial regions. For stations located within ±10° of the geomagnetic equator, equatorial E-skip can be expected on most days throughout the year, peaking around midday local time.

=== Auroral sporadic E ===
At polar latitudes, sporadic E can accompany auroras and associated disturbed magnetic conditions and is called auroral E.

Unlike equatorial or mid-latitude E_{s}, sporadic E propagation over high latitude paths is rare, and supports unexpected contacts between locations surrounding the Arctic, even during periods of low solar activity.

== Occasional "bonanza" events ==
On 12 June 2009, sporadic E allowed some television viewers in the eastern United States to see VHF analog TV stations from other states at great distances, in places and on TV channels where local stations had already done their permanent analog shutdown on the final day of the DTV transition in the United States. This was possible because VHF has been mostly avoided by digital TV stations, leaving the analog stations the last ones on the band.

As of April 2010, it was possible for many in the U.S. to see Canadian and Mexican analog in this manner during sporadic E events; this should continue until all parts of those countries complete their own analog TV shutdowns over the succeeding few years.

In some cases it is even possible to get DTV E_{s} receptions from well over 1,000 miles (1,600 km), since even for DTV, some U.S. stations still use band 1. These signals are characterized for being either extremely clear, or extremely blocky. They are also much easier to identify. Furthermore, ATSC 3.0 could make sporadic E DTV reception easier, due to its usual modulation scheme being more resistant to multipath propagation, as well as impulse noise encountered on those frequencies.

=== Notable sporadic E DX reception events ===
- The Medford Mail Tribune in Medford, Oregon reported on June 1, 1953, that KGNC-TV, channel A4 in Amarillo, and KFEL-TV, channel A2 from Denver had been received on the Trowbridge and Flynn Electric Company's television set at their Court Street warehouse, and with a pre-amplifier, a New York station's test pattern was reportedly picked up.
- The June 4, 1953 issue of the Brimfield News in Brimfield, Illinois reported that area residents " 'saw' Salt Lake City Monday (via television)". It reported that a local farm family witnessed interference to WHBF-TV, channel A4 of Rock Island, Illinois by KDYL-TV in Salt Lake City, which "blocked out all their favorite programs."
- In June 1981, Rijn Muntjewerff, in the Netherlands, received 55.25 MHz TV-2 Guaiba, Porto Alegre, Brazil, via a combination of sporadic E and afternoon TEP at a distance of 6,320 miles (10,170 km).
- On May 30, 2003, Girard Westerberg, in Lexington, Kentucky, made the first known reception of digital television by sporadic E when he decoded the PSIP identification of KOTA-DT, broadcasting on channel A2 from Rapid City, South Dakota, 1,062 miles (1,709 km) away.
- On June 26, 2003, Paul Logan, in Lisnaskea, Ireland, was the first DXer to receive transatlantic sporadic E at frequencies above 88 MHz. Stations received included 88.5 MHz WHCF Bangor, Maine (2,732 miles or 4,397 kilometres), and 97.5 MHz WFRY Watertown, New York (3,040 miles or 4,890 kilometres). David Hamilton from Cumnock in Ayrshire, Scotland, received CBTB-FM from Baie Verte, Newfoundland and Labrador, Canada, on 97.1 MHz on this day also.
- On July 20, 2003, Jozsef Nemeth, in Győr, Hungary, received TR3 Radio Miras on OIRT FM 70.61 MHz from Uly Balkan, Türkmenistan, transmitter 1,895 miles or 3,050 kilometres away.
- On July 6, 2004, an intense high MUF Sporadic-E opening allowed Mike Bugaj of Enfield, Connecticut, to receive KATV A7 1,176 miles (1,893 km) from Little Rock, Arkansas.
- On June 15, 2005, Danny Oglethorpe in Shreveport, Louisiana, received a KBEJ-TV test signal on channel A2, from Fredericksburg, Texas, by sporadic E, at a very short distance for this propagation mode: 327 miles (526 km).
- On June 26, 2009, Paul Logan, in Lisnaskea, Ireland, had transatlantic sporadic E reception on the FM band from eight US States and one Canadian Province. The most distant signal received was that of 90.7 WVAS radio in Montgomery, Alabama, at 6,456 km (4,012 mi). This reception was recorded and later confirmed by WVAS newsreader Marcus Hyles.
- On May 31, 2010, Mike Fallon, in East Sussex, United Kingdom, received a transatlantic signal from the religious station La Voz de la Luz, in Salvaleón de Higüey, a radio station in the Dominican Republic on 88.7 MHz from 12:48 UTC for approximately 20 minutes at a distance of 4,302 miles (6,923 km) via multihop Sporadic-E. This reception was confirmed via an email from the station.
- On November 24, 2016, many radio listeners from Australia and New Zealand were able to listen to radio stations from other states of Australia, overlapping many radio signals. Many people complained about this, saying that many of their favorite radio stations got replaced by different radio stations from other states. Later, the ACMA confirmed that this was caused by sporadic E.

== See also ==
- TV and FM DX
