= 70-centimeter band =

Amateur radio frequency band

The 70-centimeter or 440 MHz band is a portion of the UHF radio spectrum internationally allocated to amateur radio and amateur satellite use. The ITU amateur radio allocation is from 430 to 440 MHz; however, some countries, such as the United States, allocate hams 420 to 450 MHz. Depending on the country the band is shared with other radio services (in United States with government radar systems such as PAVE PAWS).

70 centimeters is a popular ham band due to the ready availability of equipment in both new and used markets. Most amateurs operating on 70 cm use either equipment purpose-built for ham radio, or commercial equipment designed for nearby land mobile frequencies. Amateurs usually use the band for FM or digital voice communications through repeaters (useful for emergency communications), as well as narrow band modes (analog and digital) for long-distance communications (called "DX", including Moon bounce). The band is also popular for Amateur Satellite Service. Due to its size, it's the lowest frequency ham band which can support amateur television transmissions in the USA. In Europe the lowest band for ATV is 23cm.

== Band allocation ==
The band's allocation varies regionally. In the United States and Trinidad and Tobago, the band ranges from 420 to 450 MHz with some geographical limitations. In Canada and Australia, the band is 430–450 MHz. In the UK and Ireland amateurs are allocated 430–440 MHz. By international treaty between the US and Canada, operation in the portion of the band from 420 to 430 MHz is prohibited north of Line A, which runs just south of the Canada–US border from Washington state to Maine, and east of Line C, which runs from northeast to southeast Alaska.

== Propagation characteristics ==
70-centimeter propagation characteristics lie midway between 2-meter and 33-centimeter (~900 MHz) bands. Above 200 MHz, as frequency increases, building penetration is reduced. Smaller obstacles may also block or reflect the signal. However, higher frequencies also present a lower noise floor, making it easier to overcome both natural and artificial interference, especially prevalent in urban environments.

== Comparison of the 2-meter and 70-centimeter bands ==
Propagation considerations are often secondary to channel availability or economic concerns in system planning. One practical concern when comparing the 70-centimeter band to the 2-meter band is that a quarter-wavelength antenna is much less unwieldy at 70 centimeters than it is at 2 meters. Portable antennas for 2 meters are generally continuously loaded coil spring or "rubber duck" types, while on 70 centimeters they can be a full quarter wavelength. The difference can be as much as 8 dB. The primary advantage of 70 centimeters is that base station antennas of very significant gain (up to 11 dB or so) are practical while 6 dB is about the practical limit on 2m. The extra 5 dB of receive and transmit gain are often critical for long-range communication, particularly for high-power repeaters which can then concentrate all of their power and receive sensitivity at the horizon.

The 70-centimeter amateur band also provides a wider spectrum than the 2-meter band (in the U.S., this is 30 MHz of spectrum, compared to only 4 MHz on the 2-meter band). This allows for many more channels, accommodating fast scan television, wideband digital modes, and point-to-point linking, which may not be permitted on 2-meter and lower frequencies, depending on local regulations.

A problem found with all UHF and higher frequencies is the prevalence of multipath signals. The reflective properties of the 70-centimeter band allow signals to be reflected by dense and solid material such as cement or rock. This creates a slight time delay between the primary and reflected signals, causing cancellations as direct and reflected signals are combined in the receiving antenna. This can cause receiving stations to experience rapid fluctuations in signal strength, or "picket fencing", when they are in motion. The problem is much less severe with modern FM systems because the receiver's limiter circuitry compensates for variations in received signal strength over a very wide amplitude range. In properly engineered systems, multipath can also be reduced by assuring that the transmitter uses only the minimum necessary power, allowing the reflected signals to be lower than the receiver's detection threshold.

70 centimeters is very close to the third harmonic of 2 meters, which allows sufficiently broadband 2–meter antennas to be used for 70 centimeters. Antennas specifically designed to work on both bands are common. Also, 2 meters is far enough away from 70 centimeters to make diplexers small and simple, making it easy to cross-band repeat signals between the two bands with a single dual-band radio.

== Use for the radio control hobbies ==
In some countries, particularly Germany (until the end of 2008) and Switzerland, a portion of the 70 cm band overlaps with a secondary frequency allocation for the operation of Radio control models. In Germany, 33 frequencies were available for RC use, and in Switzerland, ten frequencies are available. These frequencies fall within the LPD433 band used by short range devices in Europe.

In North America, licensed amateurs may conduct RC operations in the 70 cm band, but unlike similar operations in the 6-meter band, no specific frequencies have been set aside for RC use. American radio amateurs may use a maximum of one watt of radiated RF power, on any ham frequency authorized for data emissions, to control RC models. Canadian radio amateurs may use any amateur frequency above 30 MHz for the control of RC models.

== Repeaters ==
Plus or minus 5 MHz is a common repeater frequency offset in the 70 cm band in the USA. A split of 1.6 MHz is common elsewhere.

== See also ==
- LPD433
- ISM band

Range	Band	ITU Region 1	ITU Region 2	ITU Region 3
LF	2200 m	135.7–137.8 kHz		
MF	630 m	472–479 kHz		
MF	160 m	1.810–1.850 MHz	1.800–2.000 MHz	
HF	80 / 75 m	3.500–3.800 MHz	3.500–4.000 MHz	3.500–3.900 MHz
HF	60 m	5.3515–5.3665 MHz		
HF	40 m	7.000–7.200 MHz	7.000–7.300 MHz	7.000–7.200 MHz
HF	30 m^{[t2]}	10.100–10.150 MHz		
HF	20 m	14.000–14.350 MHz		
HF	17 m^{[t2]}	18.068–18.168 MHz		
HF	15 m	21.000–21.450 MHz		
HF	12 m^{[t2]}	24.890–24.990 MHz		
HF	10 m	28.000–29.700 MHz		
VHF	8 m^{[t3]}	40.000–40.700 MHz	—N/a	
VHF	6 m	50.000–52.000 MHz (50.000–54.000 MHz)^{[t4]}	50.000–54.000 MHz	
VHF	5 m^{[t3]}	58.000–60.100 MHz	—N/a	
VHF	4 m^{[t3]}	70.000–70.500 MHz	—N/a	
VHF	2 m	144.000–146.000 MHz	144.000–148.000 MHz	
VHF	1.25 m	—N/a	220.000–225.000 MHz	—N/a
UHF	70 cm	430.000–440.000 MHz	430.000–440.000 MHz (420.000–450.000 MHz)^{[t4]}	
UHF	33 cm	—N/a	902.000–928.000 MHz	—N/a
UHF	23 cm	1.240–1.300 GHz		
UHF	13 cm	2.300–2.450 GHz		
SHF	9 cm	3.400–3.475 GHz^{[t4]}	3.300–3.500 GHz	
SHF	5 cm	5.650–5.850 GHz	5.650–5.925 GHz	5.650–5.850 GHz
SHF	3 cm	10.000–10.500 GHz		
SHF	1.2 cm	24.000–24.250 GHz		
EHF	6 mm	47.000–47.200 GHz		
EHF	4 mm^{[t4]}	75.500 GHz^{[t3]} – 81.500 GHz	76.000–81.500 GHz	
EHF	2.5 mm	122.250–123.000 GHz		
EHF	2 mm	134.000–141.000 GHz		
EHF	1 mm	241.000–250.000 GHz		
THF	Sub-mm	Some administrations have authorized spectrum for amateur use in this region; others have declined to regulate frequencies above 300 GHz.		
[t1]	All allocations are subject to variation by country. For simplicity, only common allocations found internationally are listed. See a band's article for specifics.			
[t2]	HF allocation created at the 1979 World Administrative Radio Conference. These are commonly called the "WARC bands".			
[t3]	This is not mentioned in the ITU's Table of Frequency Allocations, but many individual administrations have commonly adopted this allocation under "Article 4.4".			
[t4]	This includes a currently active footnote allocation mentioned in the ITU's Table of Frequency Allocations. These allocations may only apply to a group of countries.			
See also: Radio spectrum, Electromagnetic spectrum
