= 2-meter band =

Amateur radio frequency band

The 2-meter amateur radio band is a portion of the VHF radio spectrum that comprises frequencies stretching from 144 MHz to 148 MHz in International Telecommunication Union region (ITU) Regions 2 (North and South America plus Hawaii) and 3 (Asia and Oceania) and from 144 MHz to 146 MHz in ITU Region 1 (Europe, Africa, and Russia). The license privileges of amateur radio operators include the use of frequencies within this band for telecommunication, usually conducted locally with a line-of-sight range of about 100 miles (160 km).

== Operation ==
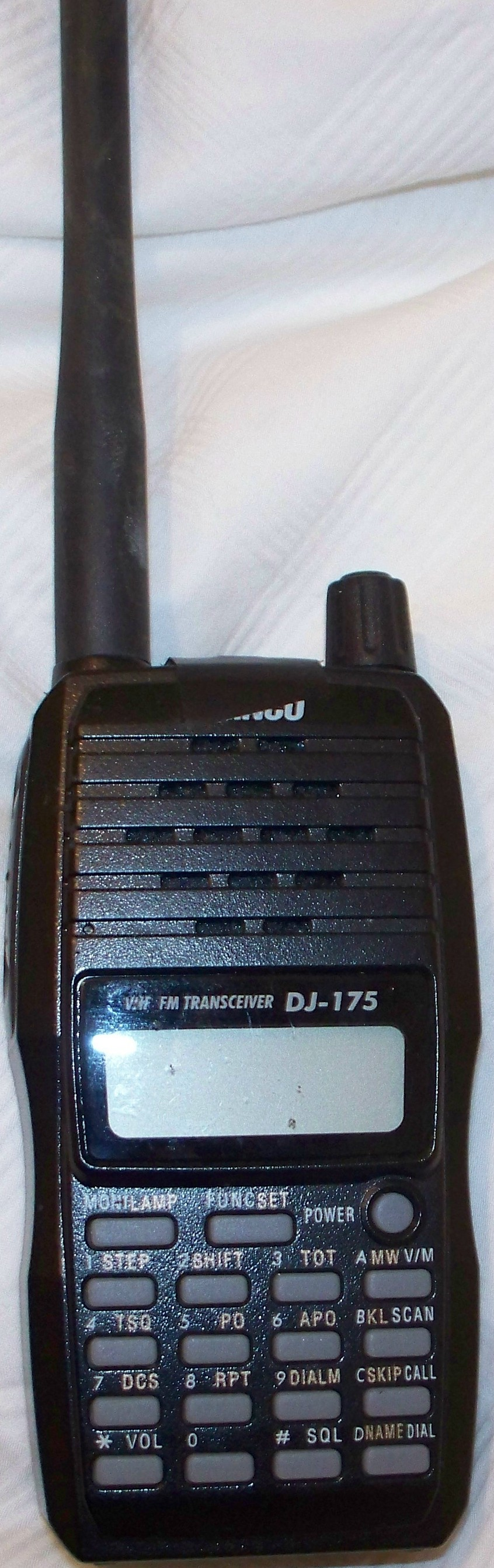
A 2-meter band handheld transceiver.

Because it is local and reliable, and because the licensing requirements to transmit on the 2-meter band are easy to meet in many parts of the world, this band is one of the most popular non-HF ham bands. This popularity, the compact size of needed radios and antennas, and this band's ability to provide easy reliable local communications also means that it is also the most used band for local emergency communications efforts, such as providing communications between Red Cross shelters and local authorities. In the US, that role in emergency communications is furthered by the fact that many amateur-radio operators have a 2-meter handheld transceiver (HT), also known as a handie-talkie or walkie-talkie.

== Repeaters and FM ==
Much of 2-meter FM operations use radio repeaters, which consist of a radio receiver and transmitter that instantly retransmits a received signal on a separate frequency. Repeaters are normally located in high locations such as a tall building or a hilltop overlooking expanses of territory. On VHF frequencies such as 2-meters, antenna height greatly influences how far one can talk. Typical reliable repeater range is about 25 miles (40 km). Some repeaters in unusually high locations, such as skyscrapers or mountain tops, can be usable as far out as 75 miles (121 km). Reliable range is very dependent on the height of the repeater antenna and also on the height and surroundings of the handheld or mobile unit attempting to access to the repeater. Line of sight would be the ultimate in reliability. The typical handheld two meter FM transceiver produces about 5 watts of transmit power. Stations in a car or home might provide higher power, 25 to 75 watts, and may use a simple vertical antenna mounted on a pole or on the rooftop of a house or a vehicle.

Even without repeaters available, however, the 2-meter band provides reliable crosstown communications throughout smaller towns, making it ideal for emergency communications. Repeaters typically use a collinear antenna array with vertical polarization, which allows the repeater to cover a large area of land without wasting energy above or below the antenna. Antennas for repeater work are almost always vertically polarized to match the repeater's vertical polarization.Matching polarization allows for maximum signal coupling which equates to stronger signals in both directions. Simple radios for FM repeater operation have become plentiful and inexpensive in recent years.

== Communications beyond 50 miles ==
While the 2 meter band is best known as a local band using the FM mode, there are many opportunities for long distance (DX) communications using other modes. A well-placed antenna and high-power equipment can achieve distances of up to a few hundred miles, and fortuitous propagation conditions called "signal enhancements" can on occasion reach across oceans.

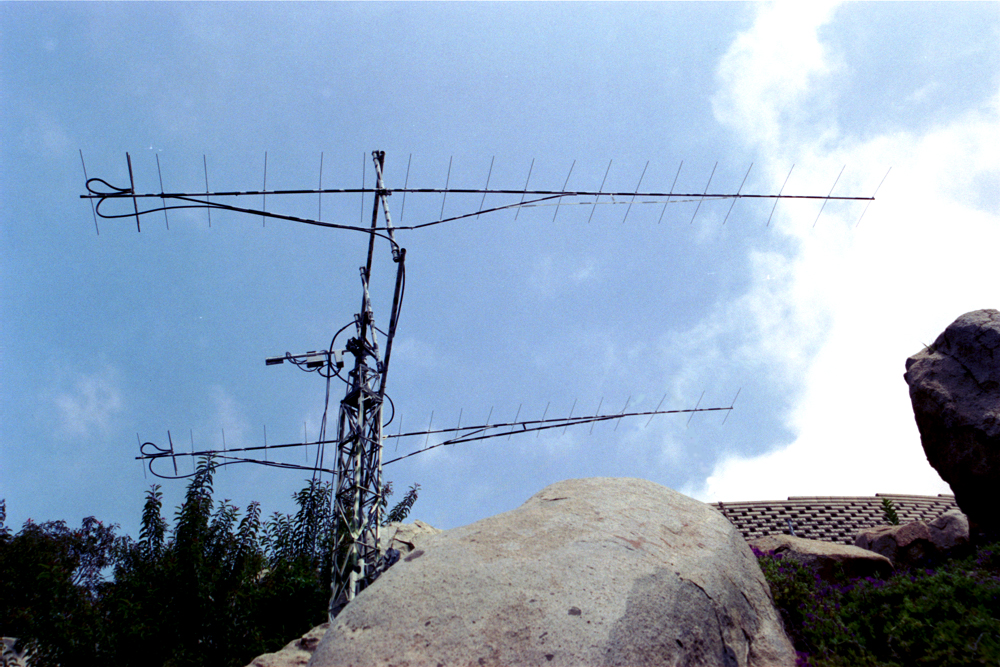
A set of two long Yagi antennas for the 2 meter band fed in phase to obtain more gain and narrow main lobe of radiation (station WA6PY).

The typical 2 meter station using CW (Morse code) or SSB (single side band) modes consists of a radio driving a power amplifier generating about 200–500 watts of RF power. This extra power is usually fed to a multi-element, compound antenna, usually a Yagi-Uda or Yagi, which can beam most of the signal power towards the intended receiving station. "Beam antennas" provide substantial increase in signal directivity over ordinary dipole or vertical antennas. Antennas used for distance work are usually horizontally polarized instead of the vertical polarization customarily used for local contacts.

Stations that have antennas located in relatively high locations with views (from the antenna) clear to the horizon have a big advantage over other stations. Such stations are able to communicate 100–300 miles (160–480 km) consistently. It is usual for them to be heard at distances far beyond line of sight on a daily basis without help from signal enhancements. Signal enhancements are unusual circumstances in the atmosphere and ionosphere that bend the signal path into an arc that better follows the curve of the Earth, instead of the radio waves traveling in the usual straight line off into space. The best known of these are:

- tropospheric ducting
- sporadic E
- meteor scatter

These and other well-known forms of VHF signal enhancement that allow trans-oceanic and trans-continental contacts on 2 meters are described in the subsections that follow within this section.

With the exception of sporadic E, directional antennas such as Yagis or log periodic antennas are almost essential to take advantage of signal enhancements. When a well-equipped station with its antenna well-located “high and in the clear” is operating during a signal enhancement, astonishing distances can be bridged, momentarily approaching what is regularly possible on shortwave and mediumwave.

=== Tropospheric ducting ===
Occasionally, signal bending in the atmosphere's troposphere known as tropospheric ducting can allow 2 meter signals to carry hundreds or even thousands of kilometers as evidenced by the occasional 2 meter contact between the west coast of the United States and the Hawaiian Islands, the northeast region to the Florida coast, and across the Gulf of Mexico. These so-called "Openings" are generally first spotted by amateurs operating SSB (Single Side Band) and CW (Continuous Wave) modes since amateurs using these modes typically are attempting distance contacts (DX) and alert for signal enhancement events.

Completion of contacts using these weak signal modes involves the exchange of signal level reports and location by grid square, known as the Maidenhead Locator System. Two way ducting contacts can have very strong signals and are often made with moderate power, small antennas, and other types of modes. Long distance ducting contacts do occur using FM modes as well but for the most part go unnoticed by many FM operators.

=== Sporadic E ===
Another form of VHF propagation is called Sporadic E propagation. This is a phenomenon whereby radio signals are reflected back towards Earth by highly ionized segments of the ionosphere which can facilitate contacts in excess of 1,000 miles (1,600 km) with very strong signals received by both parties.

Unlike some other long distance modes, high power and large antennas are often not required to make contact with distant stations via a sporadic E event. A two-way conversation can take place over a distance of several hundred kilometers or more, often using low levels of RF power. Sporadic E is a rare and completely random propagation phenomenon lasting anywhere from a matter of minutes to several hours.

=== Satellite communications ===
Satellites are basically repeater stations in orbit. The 2 meter band is also used in conjunction with the 70-centimeter band, or the 10-meter band and various microwave bands via orbiting amateur radio satellites. This is known as cross-band repeating. On-board software defines what mode or band is in use at any particular time and this is determined by amateurs at so-called Earth stations who control or instruct the satellite behavior. Amateurs know what mode is in use via published internet schedules.

For instance, a favorite mode is Mode "B" or "V/U" which simply indicates the uplink and downlink frequencies or bands the satellite is currently using. In this example, V/U means VHF/UHF or VHF uplink with UHF downlink. Most amateur satellites are in Low Earth orbit (LEO) and generally are at about 450 miles (700 km) altitude. At that height, amateurs can expect reception distances of up to around 3,000 miles (4,800 km).

A few amateur satellites have very high elliptical orbits. These satellites can reach altitudes of 30,000 miles (50,000 km) above the Earth where an entire hemisphere is visible providing outstanding communications capabilities from any two points on the Earth within line of sight of the satellite; distances that are far beyond the reach of the LEOs.

=== Transequatorial propagation ===
Transequatorial propagation (TEP) is a regular daytime occurrence on the 2 meter band over the equatorial regions and is common in the temperate latitudes in late spring, early summer and, to a lesser degree, in early winter. For receiving stations located within ± 10 degrees of the geomagnetic equator, equatorial E-skip can be expected on most days throughout the year, peaking around midday local time.

=== Meteor burst ===
By speeding up Morse code using analog tape or digital modes such as JT6M or FSK441, very short high-speed bursts of digital data can be bounced off the ionized gas trail of meteor showers. The speed required to confirm a two way contact via a short-lived ionized meteor trail can only be performed by fast computers on both ends with very little human interaction.

One computer will send a request for contact and if successfully received by a distant station, a reply will be sent by the receiving stations computer usually via the same ionized meteor trail to confirm the contact. If nothing is received after the request, a new request is transmitted. This continues until a reply is received to confirm the contact or until no contact can be made and no new requests are sent. Using this high speed digital mode, a full two-way contact can be completed in one second or less and can only be validated using a computer. Depending on the intensity of the ionized meteor trail, multiple contacts from multiple stations can be made off the same trail until it dissipates and can no longer reflect VHF signals with sufficient strength. This mode is often called burst transmission and can yield communication distances similar to sporadic E as described above.

=== Auroral propagation ===
Another phenomenon that produces upper atmosphere ionization suitable for 2-meter DXing are the auroras. Since the ionization persists much longer than meteor trails, voice modulated radio signals may sometimes be used, but the constant movement of the ionized gas leads to heavy distortion of the signals causing the audio to sound "ghostly" and whispered. In most instances using auroral reflections on 2 meters, audio or voice is totally unintelligible and ham operators wishing to make contacts via aurora, must resort to CW (Morse code).

CW signals returning from an auroral reflection have no distinct sound or tone but simply sound like a swishing or whooshing noise. An exception to this phenomenon would be the 6 meter band which is significantly lower in frequency than the 2 meter band by 94 MHz. In many instances 6 meter voice modes are readable but with varying degrees of difficulty when reflected off an aurora. Therefore, when using an auroral event as a radio signal reflector, the reflected signal strength and signal intelligibility decreases with increasing transmitting frequency.

=== Moonbounce (EME) ===
To communicate over the longest distances, hams use moon bounce. VHF signals normally escape the Earth's atmosphere, so using the moon as a target is quite practical. Due to the distance involved and the very high path loss getting a readable signal bounced off the moon involves high power ~1,000 watts and steerable high gain antennas. Receiving these very weak return signals, again involves the use of high gain antennas (usually the same type used to transmit the signal) and a very low-noise front-end RF amplifier and a frequency stable receiver.

However, new and recent technological advances in weak signal detection has allowed the successful reception of signals off the moon using much smaller or less well equipped stations allowing reception of signals that are "in the noise" and not audible to the human ear. One of these modes is JT65 which is a digital mode. Due to the delay of the signal traveling to the moon and back (travel time approx. 2.5 seconds), a person transmitting may hear the end of their own transmission returning.

=== The Brendan Awards ===
The Irish Radio Transmitters Society has provided a series of awards for the first successful all-natural, non-bounce contacts on 2 metres between the North American and European continents. Named for Saint Brendan of Clonfert, the three awards differentiate between successful "traditional" phone/CW contact (the Brendan Trophies), successful "non-traditional" digital two-way contact (the Brendan Shields), and an award for the first verified reception in either direction, regardless of method (the Brendan Plates). Attempts at the Brendan awards have established contact, but further examination revealed the signal was bounced off the International Space Station.

== Los Angeles County statute ==
Los Angeles County has a statute (which dates from 1944) concerning mounting a "shortwave receiver" in a motor vehicle. While the statute specifically states one of the forbidden bands as 150–160 MHz, most two-meter transceivers can tune into this portion of the spectrum at least as receivers, and are therefore unlawful to mount in a motor vehicle in Los Angeles County. While arrest rarely happens, the statute is still on the books. There are also California Penal Code statutes covering similar activities. Recently, however, with new legislation in various states, licensed ham radio operators are exempt from these prohibitions including exemptions from using a radio while driving. Such prohibitions or exemptions vary from state to state.

Note: Federal law preempts many local ordinances and state laws which may prohibit a licensed amateur radio operator from possessing an amateur radio based on its factory ability to receive frequencies outside of ham bands.

Range	Band	ITU Region 1	ITU Region 2	ITU Region 3
LF	2200 m	135.7–137.8 kHz		
MF	630 m	472–479 kHz		
MF	160 m	1.810–1.850 MHz	1.800–2.000 MHz	
HF	80 / 75 m	3.500–3.800 MHz	3.500–4.000 MHz	3.500–3.900 MHz
HF	60 m	5.3515–5.3665 MHz		
HF	40 m	7.000–7.200 MHz	7.000–7.300 MHz	7.000–7.200 MHz
HF	30 m^{[t2]}	10.100–10.150 MHz		
HF	20 m	14.000–14.350 MHz		
HF	17 m^{[t2]}	18.068–18.168 MHz		
HF	15 m	21.000–21.450 MHz		
HF	12 m^{[t2]}	24.890–24.990 MHz		
HF	10 m	28.000–29.700 MHz		
VHF	8 m^{[t3]}	40.000–40.700 MHz	—N/a	
VHF	6 m	50.000–52.000 MHz (50.000–54.000 MHz)^{[t4]}	50.000–54.000 MHz	
VHF	5 m^{[t3]}	58.000–60.100 MHz	—N/a	
VHF	4 m^{[t3]}	70.000–70.500 MHz	—N/a	
VHF	2 m	144.000–146.000 MHz	144.000–148.000 MHz	
VHF	1.25 m	—N/a	220.000–225.000 MHz	—N/a
UHF	70 cm	430.000–440.000 MHz	430.000–440.000 MHz (420.000–450.000 MHz)^{[t4]}	
UHF	33 cm	—N/a	902.000–928.000 MHz	—N/a
UHF	23 cm	1.240–1.300 GHz		
UHF	13 cm	2.300–2.450 GHz		
SHF	9 cm	3.400–3.475 GHz^{[t4]}	3.300–3.500 GHz	
SHF	5 cm	5.650–5.850 GHz	5.650–5.925 GHz	5.650–5.850 GHz
SHF	3 cm	10.000–10.500 GHz		
SHF	1.2 cm	24.000–24.250 GHz		
EHF	6 mm	47.000–47.200 GHz		
EHF	4 mm^{[t4]}	75.500 GHz^{[t3]} – 81.500 GHz	76.000–81.500 GHz	
EHF	2.5 mm	122.250–123.000 GHz		
EHF	2 mm	134.000–141.000 GHz		
EHF	1 mm	241.000–250.000 GHz		
THF	Sub-mm	Some administrations have authorized spectrum for amateur use in this region; others have declined to regulate frequencies above 300 GHz.		
[t1]	All allocations are subject to variation by country. For simplicity, only common allocations found internationally are listed. See a band's article for specifics.			
[t2]	HF allocation created at the 1979 World Administrative Radio Conference. These are commonly called the "WARC bands".			
[t3]	This is not mentioned in the ITU's Table of Frequency Allocations, but many individual administrations have commonly adopted this allocation under "Article 4.4".			
[t4]	This includes a currently active footnote allocation mentioned in the ITU's Table of Frequency Allocations. These allocations may only apply to a group of countries.			
See also: Radio spectrum, Electromagnetic spectrum
