= Yaesu FT-101 =

Series of amateur radio transceivers

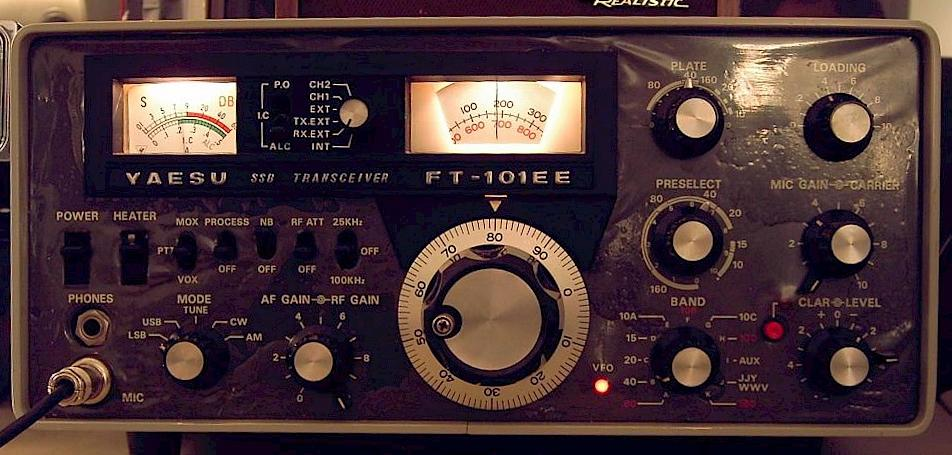
A Yaesu FT-101EE tuned to 7.180 (LSB) MHz. Many users left the protective plastic covering on to protect the face from scratching and dirt.

Yaesu FT-101 is a model line of modular amateur radio transceivers, built by the Yaesu Corporation in Japan during the 1970s and 1980s. FT-101 is a set that combines a solid state transmitter, receiver and a tube final amplifier. Its solid state features offer high-performance, low-current characteristics and its tube amplifier provides an almost mismatch-resistant transmitter and tuner stage. FT-101s were made with plug-in circuit boards that could be sent to the dealer or factory for replacement or repair. Until then, modular design was unprecedented in the amateur community. This also explains why so many FT-101s are still in use today. The rig was sold worldwide as Yaesu FT-101 and in Europe as Yaesu FT-101 and as Sommerkamp FT-277. Because of its reliability it earned its nickname "the workhorse".

== Technical description ==
The original FT101 series (1971-1977) had dual conversion, with 5 MHz Receiver first IF, a very stable and linear 9 MHz VFO and 3.2 MHz 2nd IF. They had a 12BY7A tube driver feeding two 6JS6C television sweep tubes providing a nominal output power of 130 watts peak envelope power in single sideband, 90 watts continuous wave and 40 watts amplitude modulation. The 6JS6C tubes are matched to the antenna through a conventional pi network. This transforms 3000 ohm output impedance of the tubes to a low impedance, typically 25 to 200 Ohms. These tubes were common to television sweep circuits in the day, and were in practice just as rugged and reliable in amateur service as genuine transmitter tubes such as the 6146.

These rigs were extremely reliable, and various improvements were made over the model range, especially to the receiver, from Mk1, Mk2, B and E models (very few F models were ever produced). This was also one of the first all-in-one box rigs, as it had a built-in AC Mains and 12V DC inverter power supply and even a loudspeaker, which made it ideal to use portable (it even had a carrying handle on the side). They also included two switched crystal-controlled positions for Novice license holders, who were restricted to crystal controlled transmission until the late 1970s. This feature was also required for Maritime Mobile operation.

All models after the Mk1 came with a PA fan, and the E models had a built-in RF Speech Clipper.

The FT101 was virtually the only rig that had adjustable temperature compensation in the VFO; when properly adjusted, it is extremely stable. An outboard digital display was available, the YC601.

Yaesu also brought out a pair of separates, using almost every circuit from the FT101 - the FR101 Receiver and FL101 Transmitter.

The later FT-101Z(D) series (1978-1985) was a completely different rig. It was single conversion from a 9 MHz IF, Higher power PA tubes 6146B and no plug-in circuit boards. It came also with an optional 12V inverter power supply.

== Specifications ==
- Range: 1.8-30 MHz (160/80/40/20/15/11/10 m) 160 m not covered on the Mk1 versions, 10.0-10.5 MHz (WWV receive only)
- Modes: CW, USB, LSB, AM
- Power output: SSB 260 watts PEP DC in (130 watts out), CW 180 watts PEP DC in (90 watts out), AM 80 watts PEP DC in (40 watts out)
- RX sensitivity: better than 0.3uV for 10 dB S/N
- TX freq response: 300 – 2700 Hz
- RX freq response: 300 – 2700 Hz standard Yaesu SSB filter, 600 Hz with optional Yaesu CW filter
- Optional filters: 300 – 1800 Hz SSB narrow (Fox Tango filter), 250 Hz CW narrow (Fox Tango or SMC filter)
- Audio output: 3 watts
- AC power: 110-240 V Rx 45 W, Tx 350 W
- DC power: 13.5 V Rx 0.6 A, Tx 21 A
- Weight: 33 pounds (15 kg)
- Size: 13 1/2 by 6 by 11 1/2 inches (340 mm × 150 mm × 290 mm)

QST (ARRL) Reviews of FT-101 family Transceivers (100Wpep, BW 600Hz, Spacing 20kHz)Source

		Transmitter			Receiver			
Rig	QST Review Issue	Harm. dBpep	Spurs dBpep	IMD dBpep	Min Sig dBm	BlkRng dB	IMD-DR dB	3rdOrd Icpt dBm
FT-101B	02/74							
FT-101E	09/76			-34	-141	108	81	
FT-101Z	12/79	-45		-38	-139	112	78	-22
FT-301	10/77	-55	-68	-40	-133	100	75	
FT-901	11/78	-46	-57	-38	-137	114	85	

The unit could receive from 10.0-10.5 MHz in order for reception of the WWV time and frequency standards. The unit could transmit and receive on the 160 m, 80 m, 40 m, 20 m, 15 m, and 10 m amateur radio bands. WARC band coverage was possible using aftermarket kits. All FT101 models covered the 11 metre band, but for the USA market the band crystal was often removed as well as the 11m link cut on the Driver bandswitch wafer. The Mk2, B, E, and F versions included reception and transmission on the 160 meter band, as well. Although the Mk1 did not cover 160M, there was an AUX band position, and some Yaesu dealers offered a 160M modification.

The unit can modulate using either upper sideband (USB), lower sideband (LSB), continuous wave (Morse Code), or amplitude modulation (AM). The power available in these modes is 130 W (SSB), 90 W (CW), 40 W (AM). The standard I.F. crystal filter used for transmission passed 300 Hz to 2700 Hz.

== Accessories ==
Many station accessories were available, including the FV-101 remote VFO, FL-2100 Linear Amplifier, SP-101PB Phone Patch with Speaker or SP-101 Speaker-only, YO-100 or YO-101 Monitor Scope, YC-601 Digital Display Unit, FTV-250 2 Meter Transverter, FTV-650 6 Meter Transverter, YP-150 Dummyload / Watt Meter, YD-844 Dynamic Desk Microphone and QTR-24 World Clock.

== Models ==
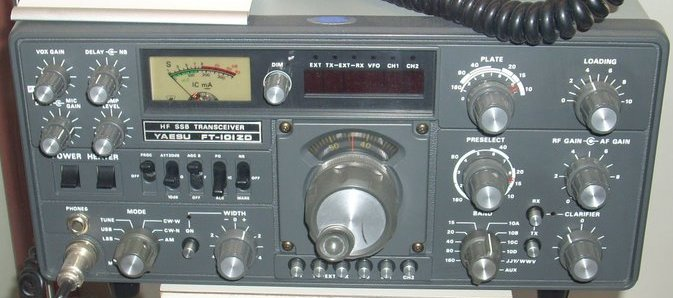
FT-101ZD

Many models in the FT-101 series were manufactured:

- The FT-101 - early model 1971 (ser # <25000) was an 80-10m band transceiver brought out in the United States which was known for its strong receiver overload, TX spurs and audio problems. This includes the unofficial subtypes Mk 0 (-06000), Mk 0A (06001-07991), Mk I (08000-23999) and Mk II (24000-24999).
- The FT-101 - late model 1972 including the unofficial Mk IIA (ser # >25000) was the same transceiver with major modifications to receiver, regulator, IF and audio boards.
- An FT-101A type was never produced.
- The FT-101B - early model 1973 (ser # <6000) 160-10m band transceiver with improved IF (PB1183B), Audio (PB1315) and Noiseblanker (PB1292) boards.
- The FT-101B - late model 1974 160-10m band transceiver (ser # >6001) with upgraded regulator (PB1314A), IF (PB1180B) and audio (PB1315A) boards.
- The FT-101BS (1973) (only for the Japanese market) with a single 6JS6C tube and only 50 watt output.
- An FT-101 C or D type was never produced.
- The 1975 FT-101E 160-10m band transceiver with RF speech processor was brought out in 3 subtypes: early (ser # <15000) with (PB1494) Processor board; mid - (ser # 15001-20500) with (PB1534) Processor board and late (ser # >20501) with (PB1534A) processor, (PB1547A) regulator, (PB1183C) IF, (PB1315B) audio and (PB1582) blanker boards.
- The FT-101EE was the economy FT-101E type which had all FT-101E specifications but without speech processor (was available as an option). Produced 1976-1979.
- The FT-101EX was the extreme economy FT-101E type which had all FT-101E specifications without speech processor (available as an option); DC converter for mobile use (available as an option); microphone, DC cord, or 160M crystal and a 10A crystal only.
- The FT-101ES was a special FT-101E model for the Japanese market only with a single 6JS6C tube and 50 watt output.
- The FT-101F was the latest in the 160-10m band series, and had an improved (PB1582) noise blanker, speech processor and DC converter boards. However, most FT101F models were badged as FT101Es outside Japan, so if you own a late model FT101E it may well actually be an FT101F.
- The FT-101FE economy FT-101F type had all FT-101F specifications except speech processor (available as an option).
- The 1977 FT-101FX extreme economy FT-101F type had all FT-101F specifications except speech processor (available as an option), DC converter for mobile use (available as an option), microphone, DC cord, or 160M crystal, 10A crystal only. This also was the last type of the original 101 series.
- The 1978 FT-101Z 160-10m band transceiver was a completely different rig, using a different I.F.s, and sadly engineered much more cheaply than the original FT101 series, for example no plug-in boards, no DC Inverter, etc etc.
- The 1980 FT-101ZD type with the WARC amateur bands added (first ZD models did not have WARC bands), was the same as the FT101Z but with digital readout and with selectable AM or FM included. This model was produced until 1985 and the last of the Yaesu FT-101 series which ceased production in 1986.

== History and lore ==
Because critical circuit designs were kept to a manageable size, hams had no problem in offering circuit changes, isolating and repairing problems. This knowledge base was so active that in January 1972, Milton Lowens (call sign WA2AOQ) founded the International Fox Tango Club and the Fox Tango Newsletter. The newsletters were published for 14 years, covering the early FT-101s through the latest Yaesu transceivers in 1985.

It was used in the TV series Jericho, as Hawkins uses it to decode Morse Code. It was also used in the TV series Falling Skies Season 4, Episode 4, as FT-101B together with a FR-101.

It was also used in movies like:

- Independence Day Resurgence (2015) set to 20m used by the forward observers in the Atlantic.
- The Bank Job (2008) has one in (RH pic)
- Die Hard 3 when Bruce Willis tries to call the Coast Guard from the ship near the end of the film
