= Irish Radio Transmitters Society =

Amateur radio organisation

- Abbreviation: IRTS
- Formation: 1932
- Type: Non-profit organization
- Purpose: Advocacy, Education
- Location(s): Dublin, Ireland; IO63vj
- Region served: Ireland
- Official language: English
- President: Jeffrey Roe EI7IRB
- Affiliations: International Amateur Radio Union
- Website: http://www.irts.ie/

The Irish Radio Transmitters Society (IRTS) is a national non-profit organization for amateur radio enthusiasts in Ireland. Key missions of the IRTS include promoting amateur radio experimentation and representing the interests of Irish amateur radio operators before Irish and international telecommunications regulatory authorities. In particular, since 2005 in agreement with Communications Regulator (Comreg), the IRTS supports the entire examination process for the Experimenter's Licence including setting, organising, and correcting examinations for the Irish amateur radio license. The organization has no paid employees, and all tasks are performed by volunteers. IRTS is the national member society representing Ireland in the International Amateur Radio Union.

== History ==
Radio in Ireland can be traced back to the 1800s with Professor George Francis Fitzgerald of TCD who in conjunction with Heinrich Hertz clarified and confirmed James Clerk Maxwell's mathematical theories of the electromagnetic field. This work led Fitzgerald to conclude in 1883 that an oscillating electric current would produce electromagnetic waves, which was experimentally confirmed by Heinrich Hertz in 1888 and used in the development of wireless telegraphy. Fitzgerald was the first to suggest a method of producing radio frequency waves which forms the basis for modern radio. An early pioneer of experimental radio in Ireland was Colonel M.J.B. Dennis who in 1898 at his home in Baltinglass, County Wicklow carried out experiments into radio transmissions. In 1913 he was one of the founding members of the Dublin Wireless Club. In 1922 the Radio Society of Ireland was founded as a National Society. The National Society and the Dublin Wireless club merged into the Wireless Society of Ireland in 1925, by this time broadcast radio was becoming popular, and a year later the first National Station 2RN started broadcasting. The original "Irish Radio Transmitters Society" was formed in 1926 by members of the WSI who were more interested in the construction of amateur transmitters and receivers rather than broadcast equipment. The IRTS that exists today consists of an amalgamation in 1932 of this group with the Wireless Society of Ireland. The first president of IRTS was Colonel Dennis, who by then had the call sign EI2B. He held office for many years and was active in amateur affairs until the war brought a stop to these in 1939. Colonel Dennis died in 1945 in his early eighties.

== Services ==
The IRTS produces a quarterly magazine Echo Ireland, detailing activities and information about Amateur Radio in Ireland, which is available to all members by post or online. A monthly online magazine "EI News" is circulated to members in the months when Echo Ireland is not produced. A weekly news service is also broadcast on amateur radio frequencies. Members may use the QSL card service and avail of the technical panel for help in with aspects of amateur radio. Throughout the year the society organises amateur radio contests on frequencies from 70 cm to 80m.

== Examinations ==
Since 2005 the IRTS supports the entire examination process for the Experimenter's Licence. The society provides a course guide for the CEPT Class B exam and examinations are held twice yearly. A separate morse code test can be arranged for those wanting to obtain a CEPT Class A license, which allows the operator to apply for a two letter callsign and may allow the operator to operate equipment in countries where morse code is still a requirement. Membership of the IRTS is not required to sit these exams.

== See also ==
- International Amateur Radio Union
- Comreg - Commission for Communications Regulation
