= Yaesu (brand) =

Japanese radio equipment company

- Type: Private
- Industry: Electronics
- Founded: 1959; 67 years ago in Yaesu, Chūō, Tokyo, Japan
- Founder: Sako Hasegawa
- Headquarters: Tokyo, Japan
- Website: www.yaesu.com

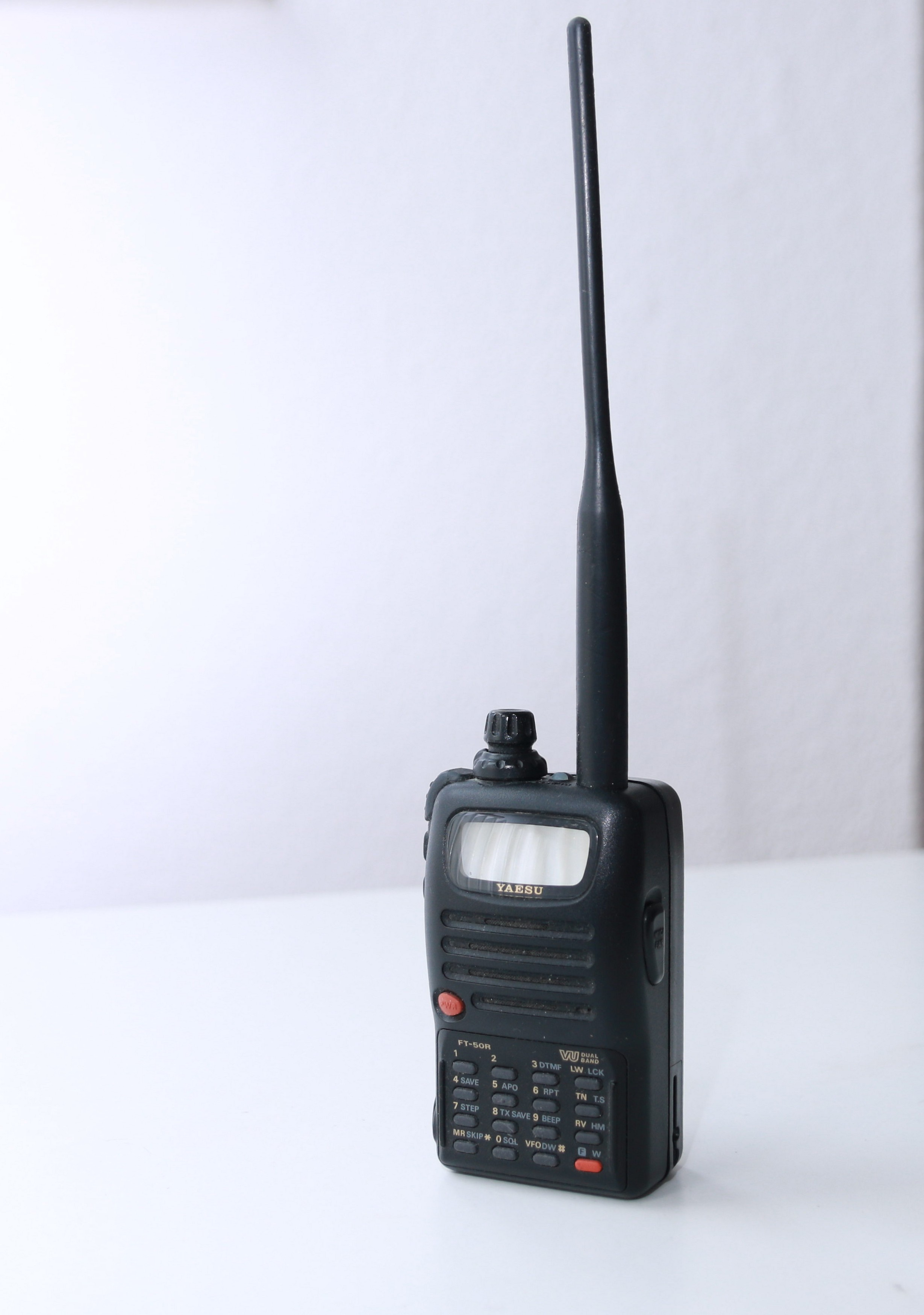
Widespread Yaesu FT50 UHF/VHF radio

Yaesu is a Japanese brand of amateur radio equipment, founded as Yaesu Musen Co., Ltd. (八重洲無線株式会社, Yaesu Musen Kabushiki-gaisha) in 1959 by a Japanese radio amateur Sako Hasegawa (call sign JA1MP) in Yaesu, Japan, a district of Tokyo.

== History ==
Yaesu had initially been formed with the intention to develop and manufacture commercial and amateur radio transceivers for the Japanese market, but only five years after its formation the company had signed foreign sales agreements for export to Australia and Germany.

In Europe, the equipment was sold under the Yaesu brand and the Sommerkamp brand. In 1963 the Swiss firm Sommerkamp imported Yaesu equipment and sold it using their own brand.

Yaesu's line of equipment was first imported into the US by Spectronics, Inc. located in Signal Hill, California, in 1965. Yaesu became an important presence in the U.S. amateur radio market with the introduction and improvement of its very popular FT-101 line of equipment in the 1970s. In addition, transceiver manufacture was outsourced to Henry Radio in Los Angeles.

Sako Hasegawa died in 1993. Following his death, Jun Hasegawa took over as managing director.

Yaesu Musen acquired the STANDARD radio equipment brand from Marantz Japan in 1998 and changed the company name to Vertex Standard Co., Ltd. (株式会社バーテックススタンダード, Kabushiki-gaisha Bātekkusu Sutandādo) in 2000. In 2007, Motorola announced its intention to purchase 80% of Vertex Standard and form a joint venture with Tokogiken (a privately held Japanese company controlled by Jun Hasegawa), which would hold the other 20%. This deal was completed in January 2008. The joint venture was dissolved effective January 1, 2012. The Vertex Standard land mobile division operates as a wholly owned subsidiary headquartered in Tokyo, Japan. The Amateur Radio, Airband and Marine Radio business was transferred to the new company "Yaesu Musen".

== Digimode "Fusion" ==
In 2013, YAESU launched its own digital mode of operation for amateur radio: "System Fusion". Like other digital modes, Fusion utilize a narrower radio bandwidth. With System Fusion, special attention was paid to compatibility with analog FM radio. This was intended to simplify migration of the existing amateur radio repeaters from analog to digital technology.

In the early 2000s, minimum-shift keying (GMSK) technology emerged in the amateur radio market as the dominant digital mode. In 2013 Yaesu introduced “System Fusion,” new technology utilizing C4FM 4-level FSK technology for transmitting digital voice data. The System Fusion communication protocol enables devices to analyze an incoming signal and automatically determine if it is using C4FM or conventional FM mode. System Fusion also enables data transfer at full rate with speeds reaching up to 9,600 bits per second.

Yaesu is the only company with System Fusion-enabled devices. ICOM, alongside the Japan Amateur Radio League has developed devices using the D-STAR protocol. Other brands use DMR, among other modes.

== Products ==
Yaesu has manufactured a number of devices listed in Yaesu radio transceivers throughout its history. The focus is still on amateur radio transceivers.
