= List of amateur radio transceivers =

This is a list of amateur radio transceivers.

== Alinco ==
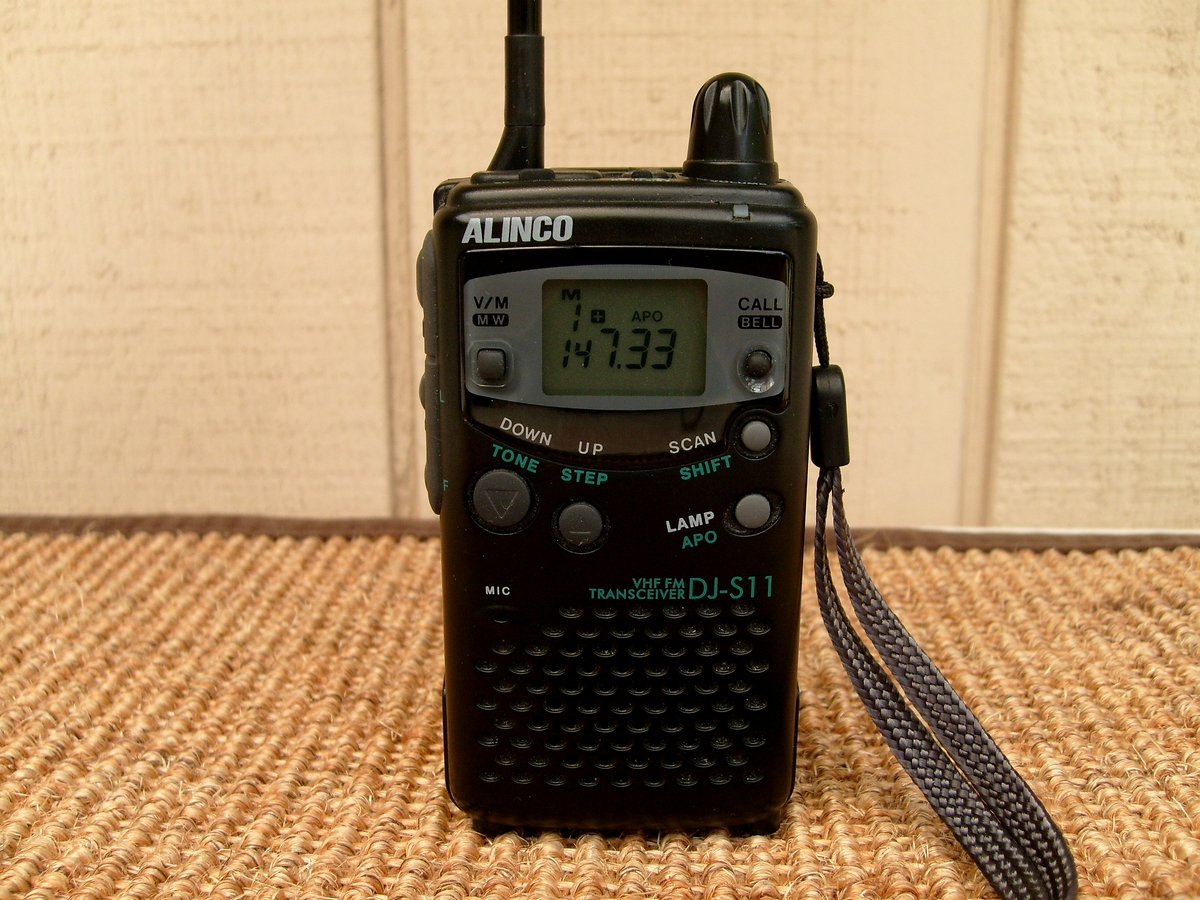
Alinco DJ-S11

=== Land ===
- DJ-100
- DJ-A10/A40
- DJ-A11/A41
- DJ-A35
- DJ-A36
- DJ-A446
- DJ-CRX series
- DJ-VX10/50
- DJ-VX11 series
- DJ-W10
- DJ-W18
- DJ-W35
- DJ-W58
- DJ-W100
- DR-138/438
- DR-CS10

== Baofeng ==
RX and TX below and elsewhere are ham radio jargon for receive and transmit.

Model	Category	Frequency ranges (MHz)
BF-F8HP	Handheld	136–174; 400–520; 65–108 (RX only)
UV-5X3	Handheld	130–179; 220–225; 400–520; 65–108 (RX only)
GMRS-V1	Handheld	15 GMRS two-way channels 8 GMRS repeater channels 130–179 (RX only); 400–520 (RX only); 65–108 (RX only)
UV-82HP	Handheld	136–174; 400–520; 65–108 (RX only)
UV-82C	Handheld	136–174; 400–520; 65–108 (RX only)
UV-5R	Handheld	136–174; 400–520; 65–108 (RX only)
BF-F8+	Handheld	136–174; 400–520; 65–108 (RX only)
UV-82	Handheld	136–174; 400–520; 65–108 (RX only)
BF-888S	Handheld	400–480; 65–108 (RX only)
UV-25X2	Portable	130–179; 400–520; 65–108 (RX only)
UV-25X4	Portable	130–179; 220–260 (Asia, US); 360–390 (Eurasia); 400–520; 65–108 (RX only)
UV-50X2	Portable	130–179; 400–520; 65–108 (RX only)
UV-50X3	Portable	136–174; 222–225; 400–480; 500–1719 (RX only); 65–108 (RX only); 108–135 (RX only); 174–250 (RX only); 300–399 (RX only); 481–520 (RX only)

=== UV-5R ===
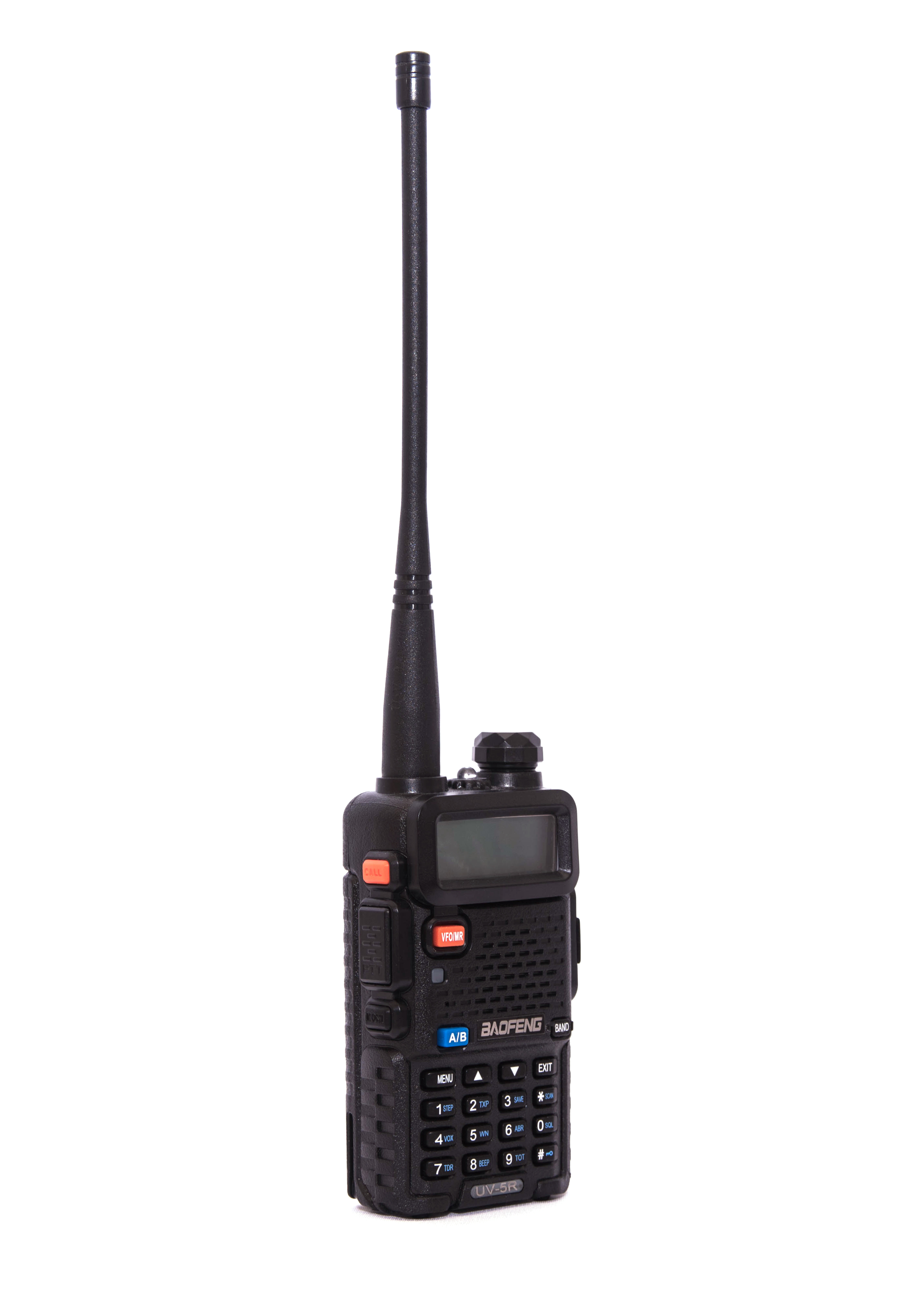
BaoFeng UV-5R

The Baofeng UV-5R is a hand-held radio that has been marketed in the United States and was produced since 2012. It has been used in a number of projects involving radios. It is described as a popular inexpensive model.

==== Features ====
The UV-5R is designed to transmit on the 2 meter band between 136 and 174 MHz and on the 70 cm band between 400 and 520 MHz. (480 MHz to 520 MHz is not available in the UK to comply with Ofcom regulations and are blocked by the manufacturer). Features include CTCSS and duplex operation for use with local repeaters, dual watch and dual reception, an LED flashlight, voice prompts in either Chinese or English and programmable LED lighting for the LCD.

=== Illegal marketing and distribution in the United States ===
The FCC cited the Houston, Texas based importer Amcrest Industries which owns and operates Baofeng radio US for illegally marketing UV-5R, "capable of operating outside the scope of its equipment authorization," the FCC Citation said, which is outside of its Part 90 authorization granted. The FCC asserts Amcrest marketed "UV-5R-series FM hand-held radios capable of transmitting on 'restricted frequencies.'" Marketing a device that is "capable of operating outside the scope of its equipment authorization," is not allowed.

== DEEPELEC ==
Hangzhou Minghong Electronic Technology Co., Ltd.

- DP-666 TEF6686

== Hytera ==
- Hytera MD785G

== Quansheng ==
Model	Category	Frequency ranges (MHz)
TG-UV2	Handheld	88–108 MHz (RX Only) 136–174 MHz 400–470 MHz
TG-UV2 Plus	Handheld	88–108 MHz (RX Only) 136–174 MHz 350–390 MHz (RX Only) 400–470 MHz 470–520 MHz (RX Only)
UV-K5	Handheld	136–174 MHz 400–470 MHz 50–76 MHz (RX Only) 76–108 MHz (RX Only) 108–136 MHz (RX Only) 136–174 MHz (RX Only) 174–350 MHz (RX Only) 350–400 MHz (RX Only) 400–600 MHz (RX Only)
UV-K6	Handheld	136–174 MHz 400–470 MHz 50–76 MHz (RX Only) 76–108 MHz (RX Only) 108–136 MHz (RX Only) 136–174 MHz (RX Only) 174–350 MHz (RX Only) 350–400 MHz (RX Only) 400–600 MHz (RX Only)

== CRT France ==
Communication Radio Telecommunication France is a company producing amateur radio transceivers.

Model	Category	Frequency ranges (MHz)
FP 00	Handheld	RX/TX: 144-146 MHz / 430-440 MHz
1 FP	Handheld	RX/TX: 144-146 MHz / 430-440 MHz
2 FP	Handheld	RX/TX: 144-146 MHz / 430-440 MHz
P2N	Handheld	RX/TX: 144-146 MHz / 430-440 MHz
4 CF V2	Handheld	RX/TX: 144-146 MHz / 430-440 MHz

== Icom ==
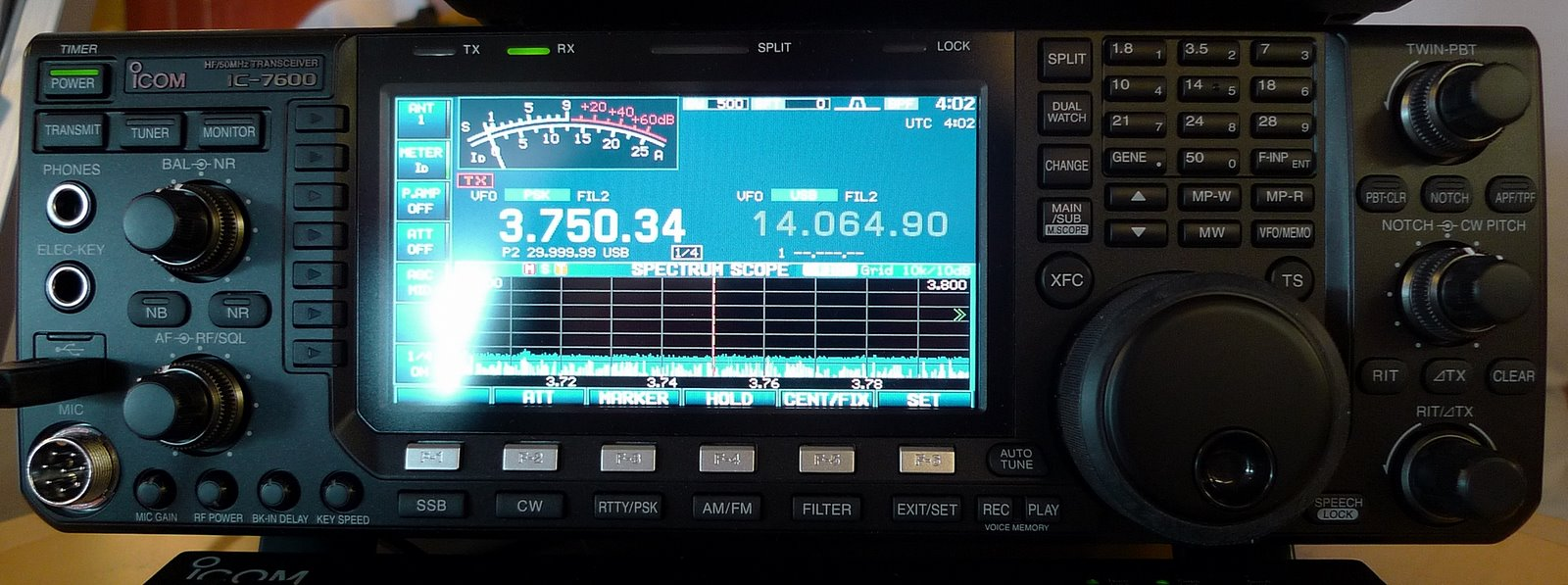
Icom IC-7600

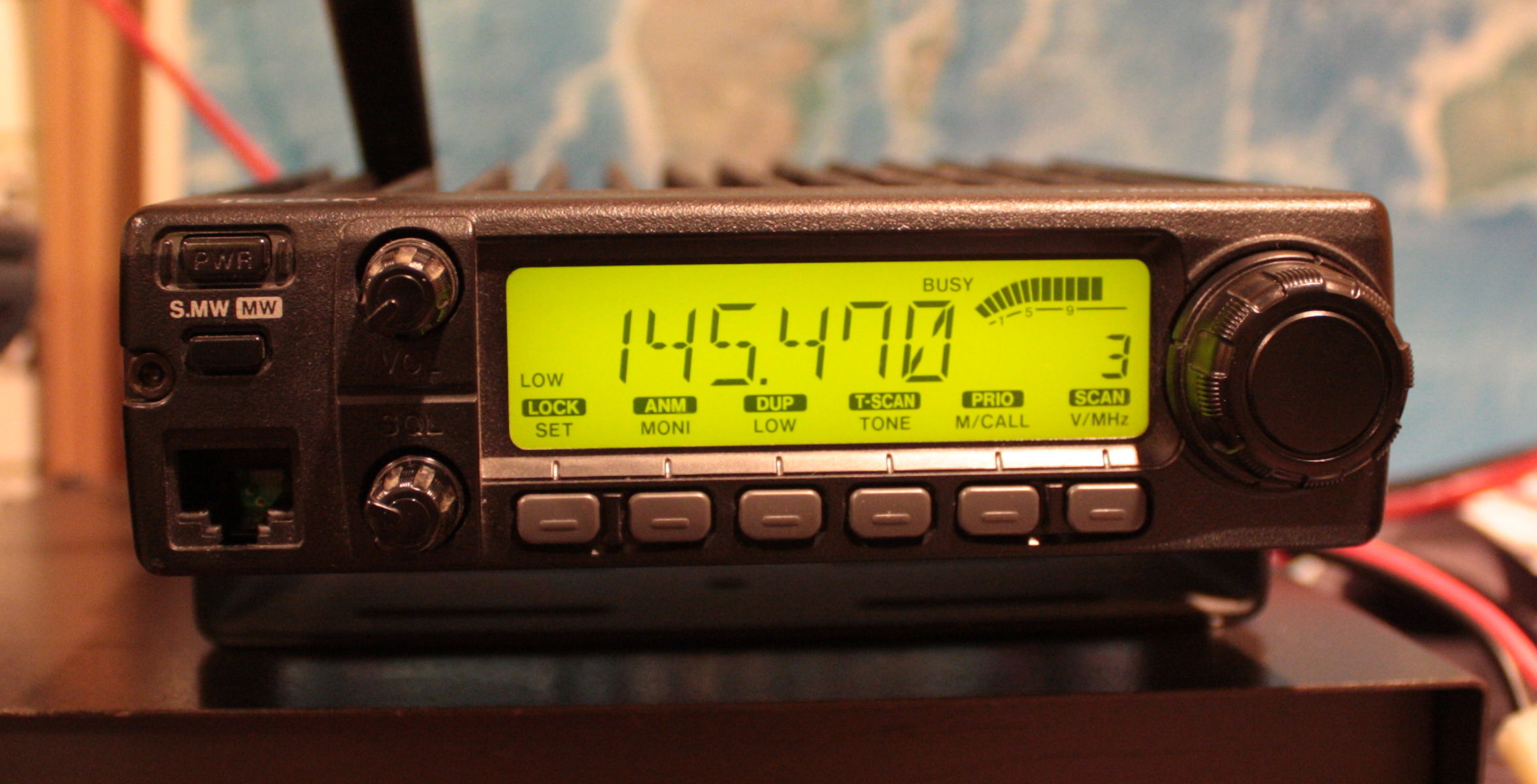
Icom IC-2100

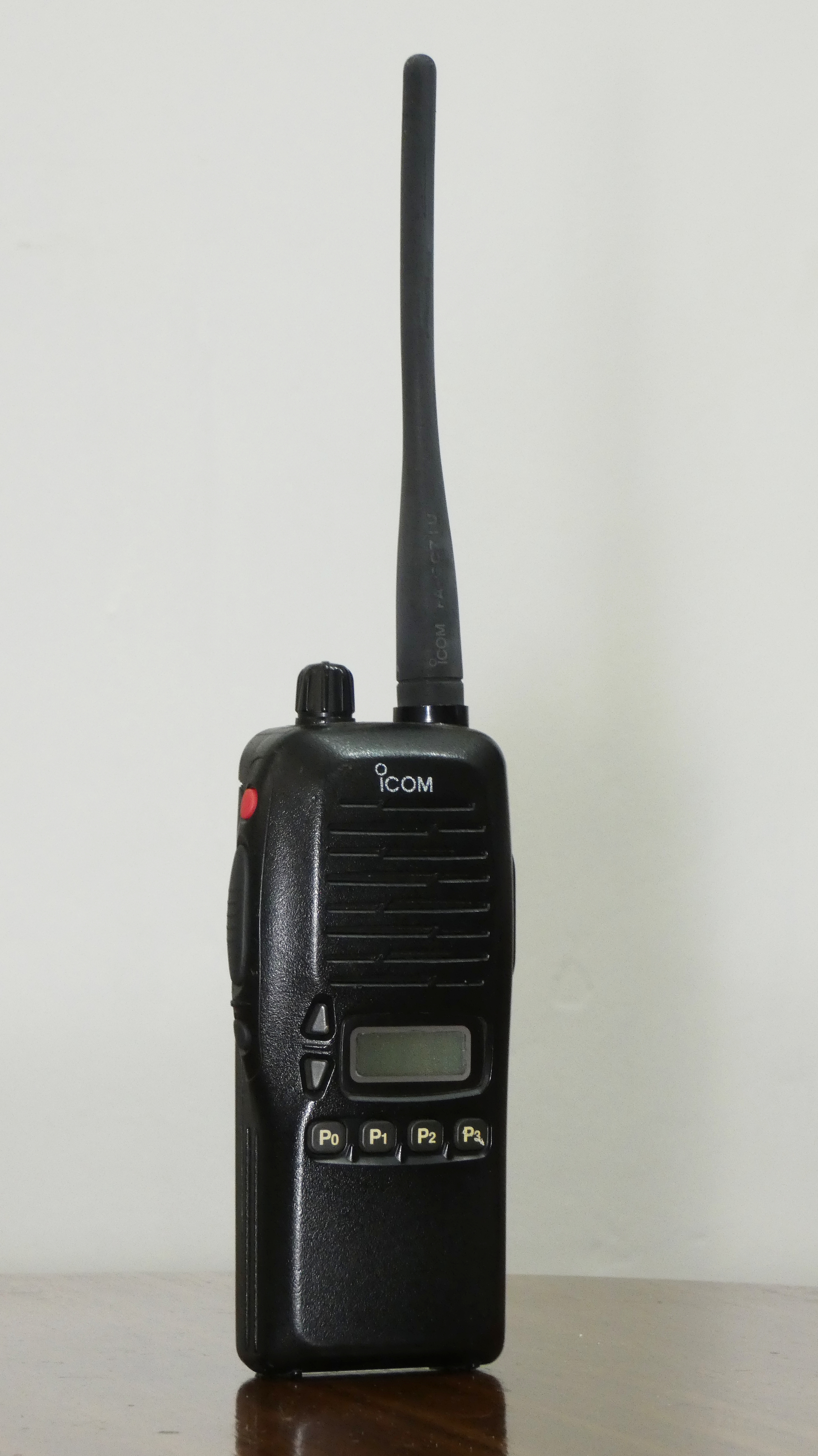
Icom IC-F4GS

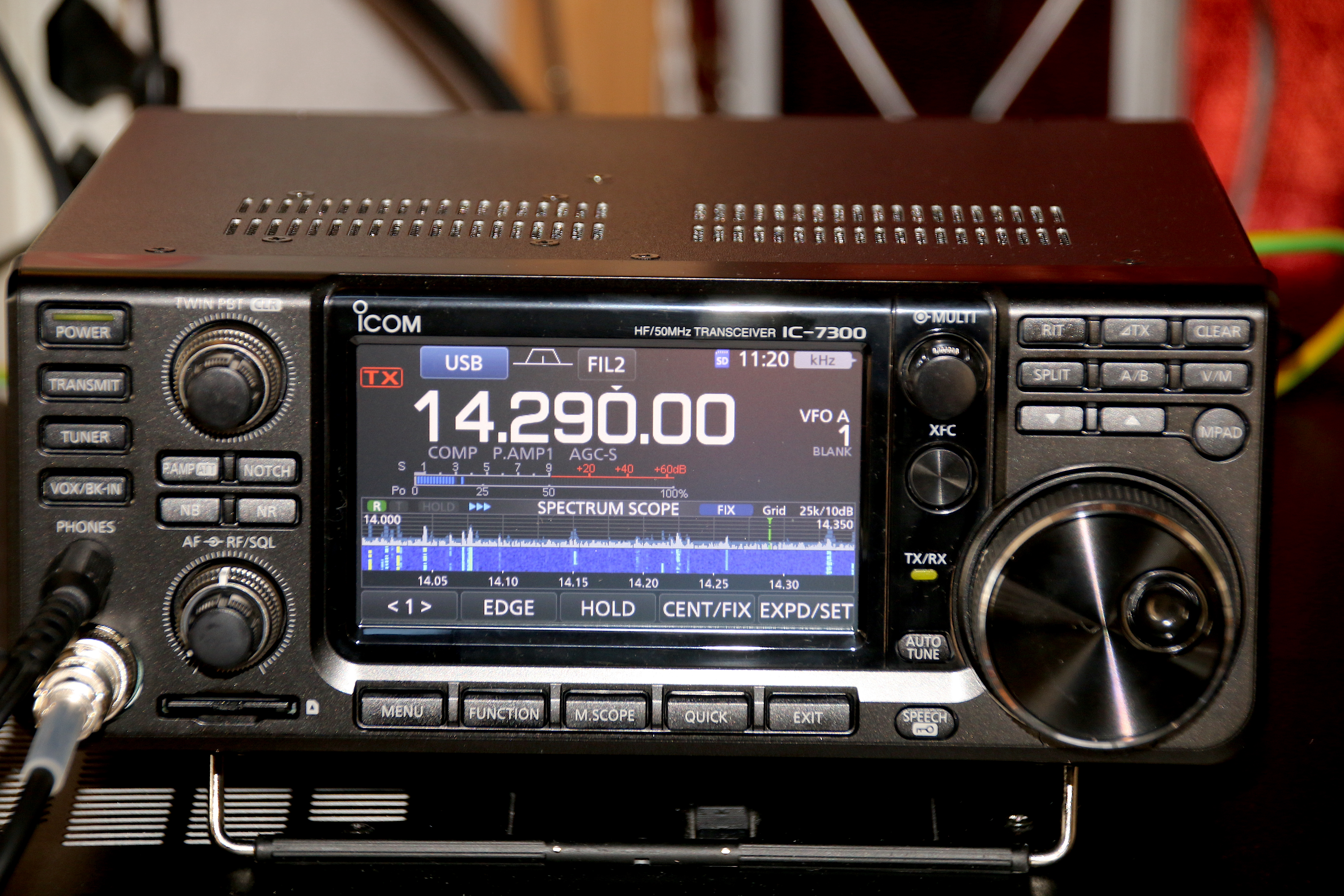
Icom IC-7300

=== Handheld ===
- ID-51
- ID-31 (DSTAR)
- ID-52 (DSTAR)
- IC-2AT (ANALOG)
- IC-F4GS (ANALOG UHF)
- IC-T70A (ANALOG DUAL BAND)
- IC-T10 (ANALOG DUAL BAND)
- IC-T90A (ANALOG TRI-BAND)
- IC-V80 (ANALOG)
- IC-V86 (ANALOG)

=== HF ===
- IC-7800
- IC-7851
- IC-7700
- IC-7610
- IC-7600
- IC-7300
- IC-7200
- IC-703
- IC-718
- IC-728

=== HF/VHF/UHF all mode ===
- IC-9100
- IC-7000
- IC-7100
- IC-705
- IC-7110

=== VHF/UHF all mode ===
- IC-9700

== Kenwood ==
Among the product lines are the "TS" series of HF transceivers which cover the HF ("high frequency") bands, from 1.8 to 50 MHz. These transceivers include the TS-820S, the TS-590S, the TS-850S, the TS-430S.

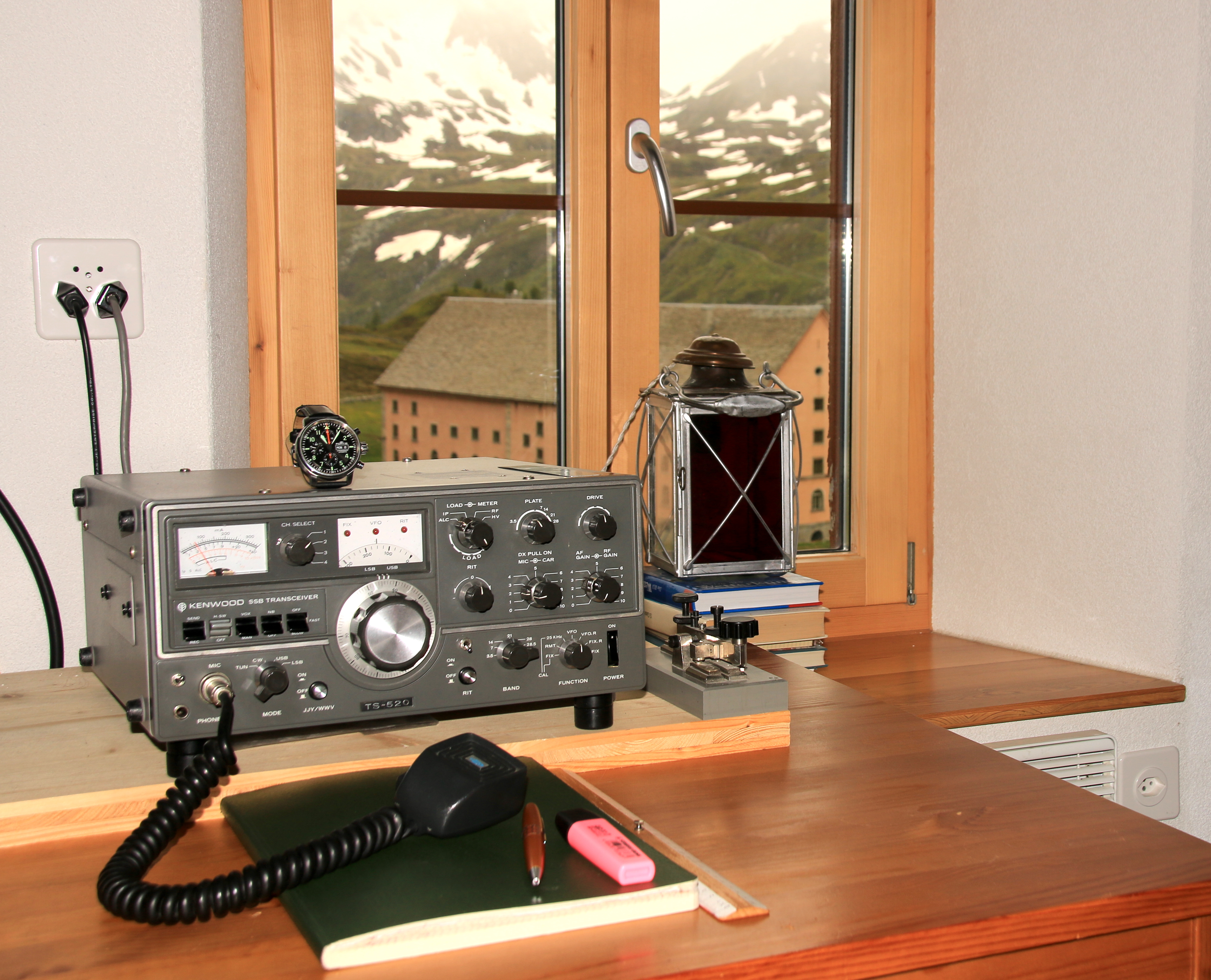
Kenwood TS-520 transceiver

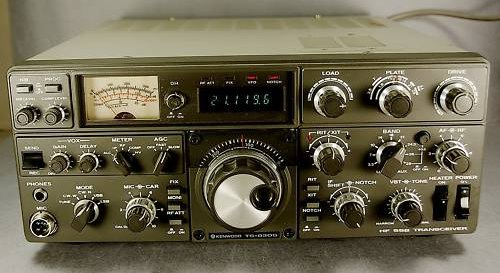
Kenwood TS-830S transceiver

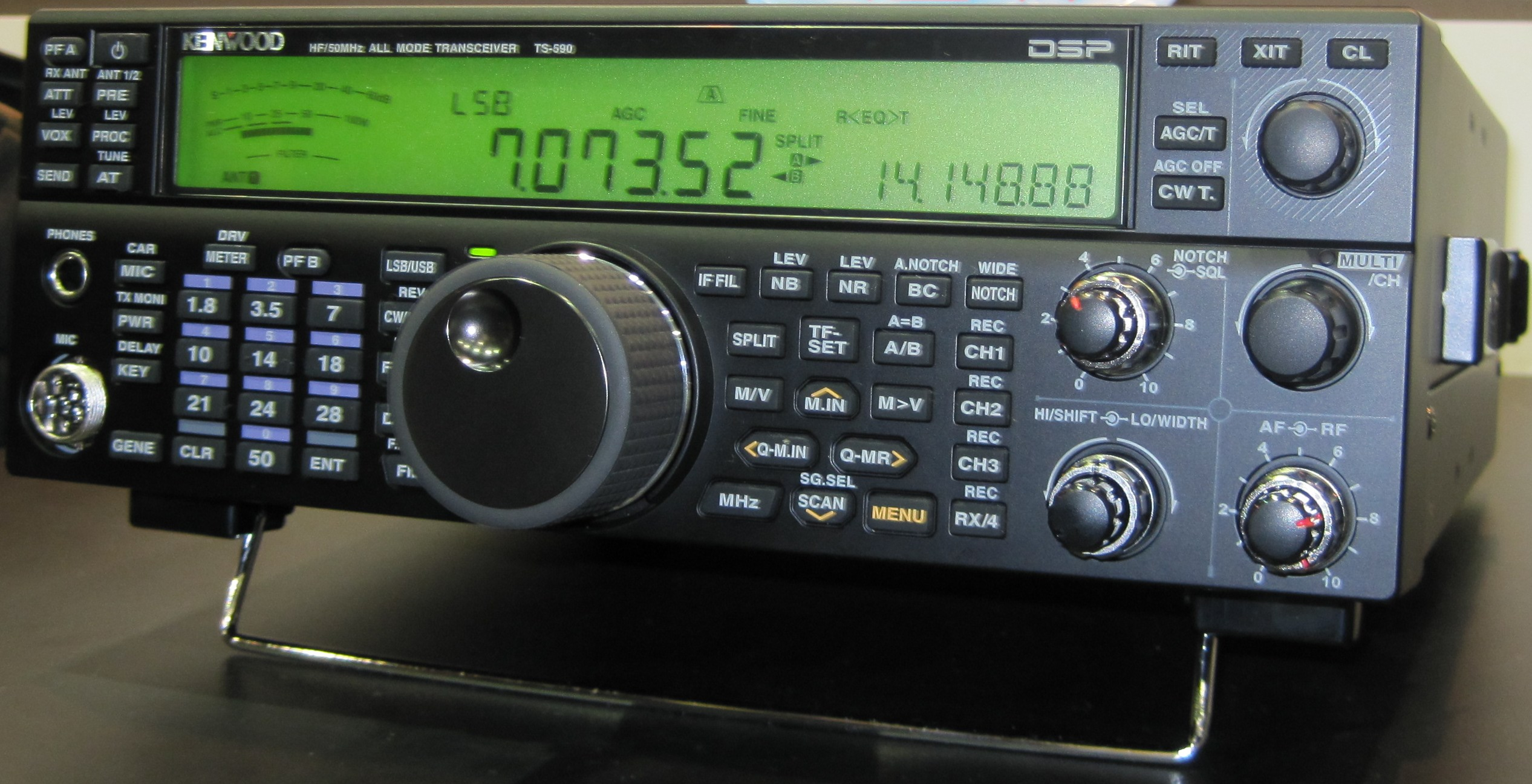
Kenwood TS-590S transceiver

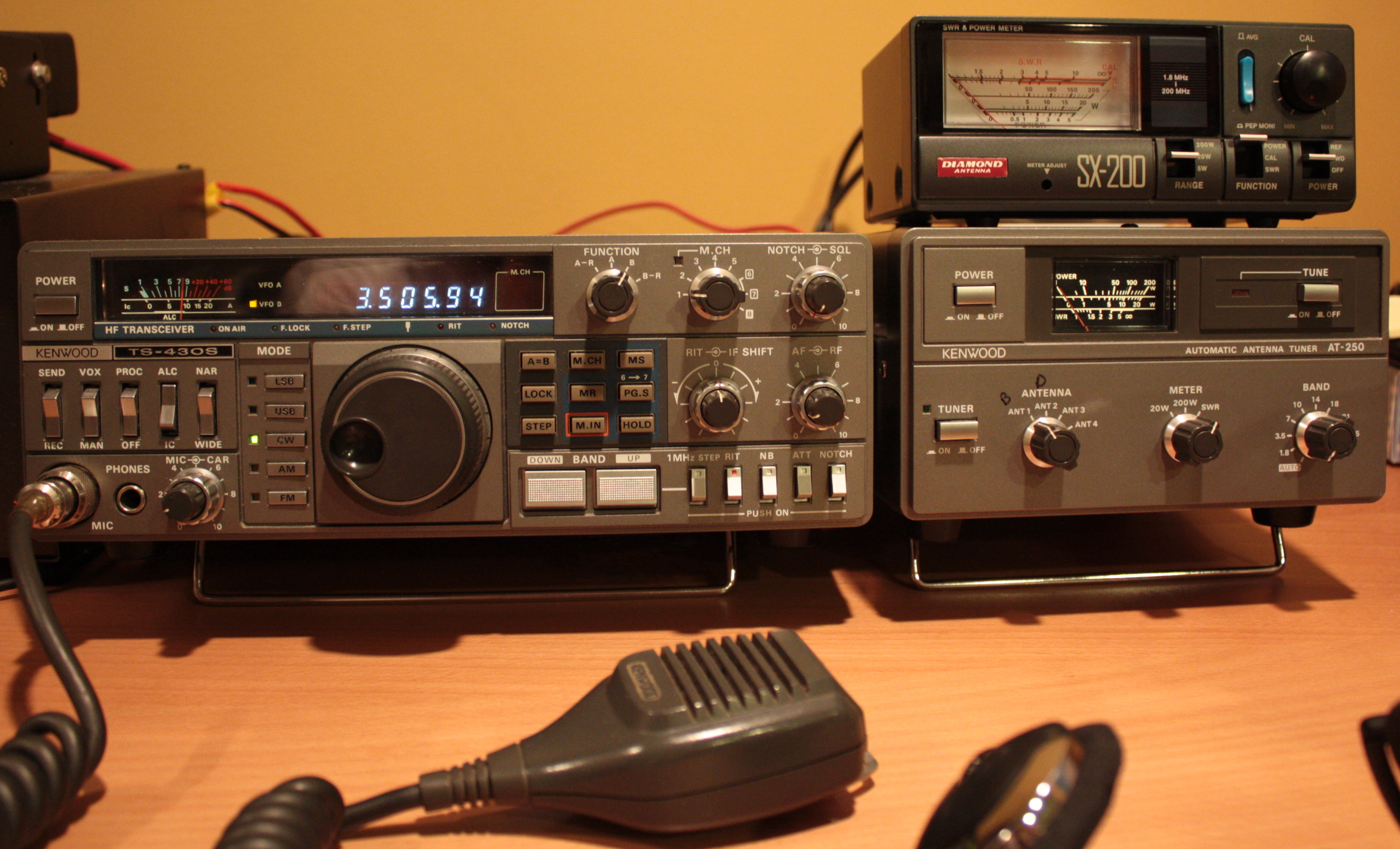
Kenwood TS-430S HF transceiver (left) and Kenwood AT-250 automatic antenna tuner (right)

Other series include the 100, 500, and the 2000 series. Kenwood also offers a "B" model, which is a transceiver without display or controls and is completely controlled by a remote computer or a separate control unit.

- Radios with built-in digital data modes and modems (for APRS)

=== HF HF/VHF/UHF ===
==== TS-2000 ====
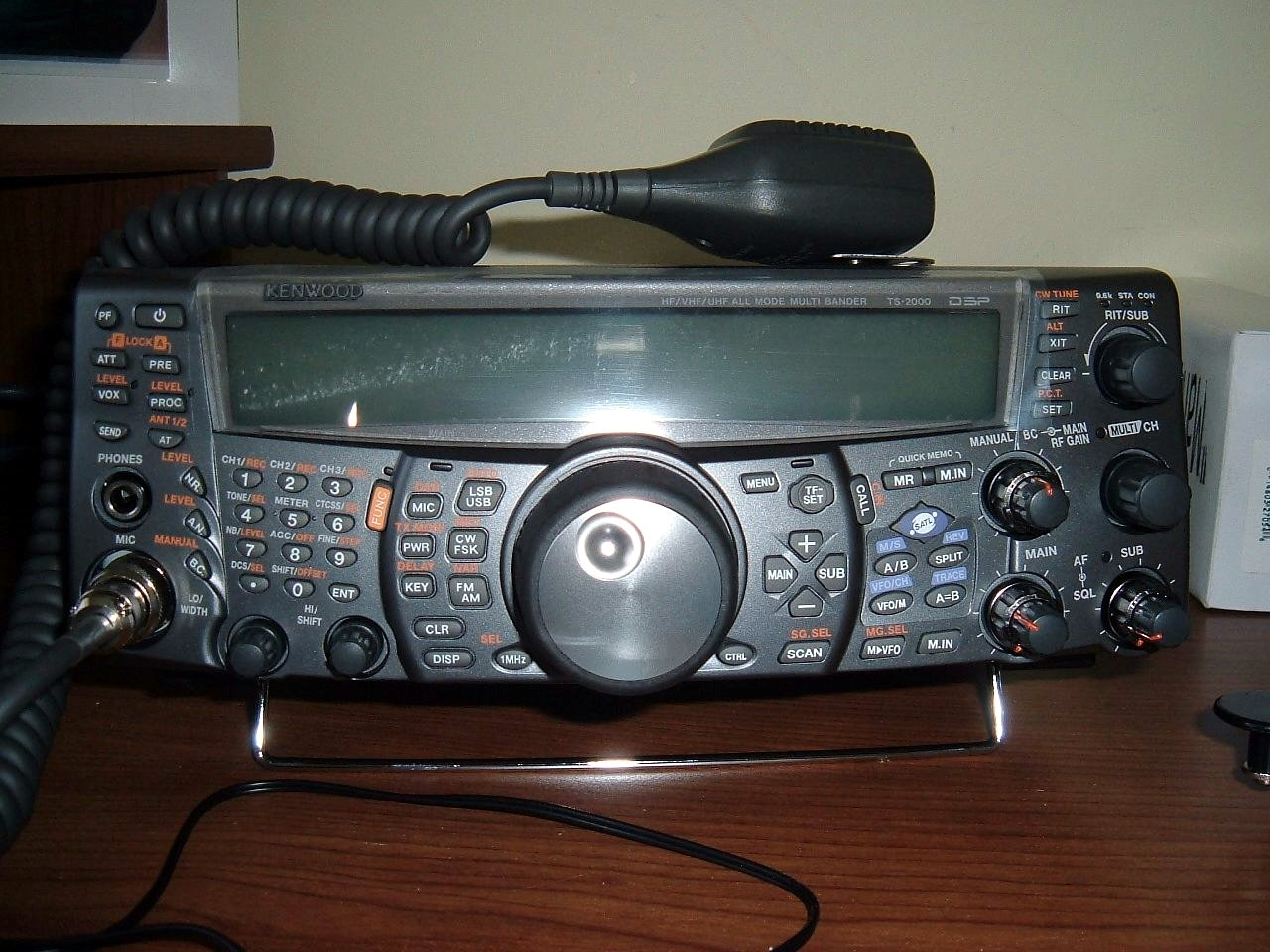
Kenwood TS-2000 (powered off)

The Kenwood TS-2000 is an amateur radio transceiver manufactured by the Kenwood Corporation. Introduced in the year 2000, the radio was known for its "all-in-one" functionality. It can transmit on all amateur radio bands between 160 meters and 70 centimeters, with the exception of the 1.25 meters band, and the "X" model also has built-in 23 centimeters band capability option. Kenwood discontinued production of the TS-2000 in September, 2018.

===== Variations =====
- TS-2000, the standard base station model, with the regional versions
  - K-Type for the Americas;
  - E-Type for Europe;
  - E2-Type for Spain;
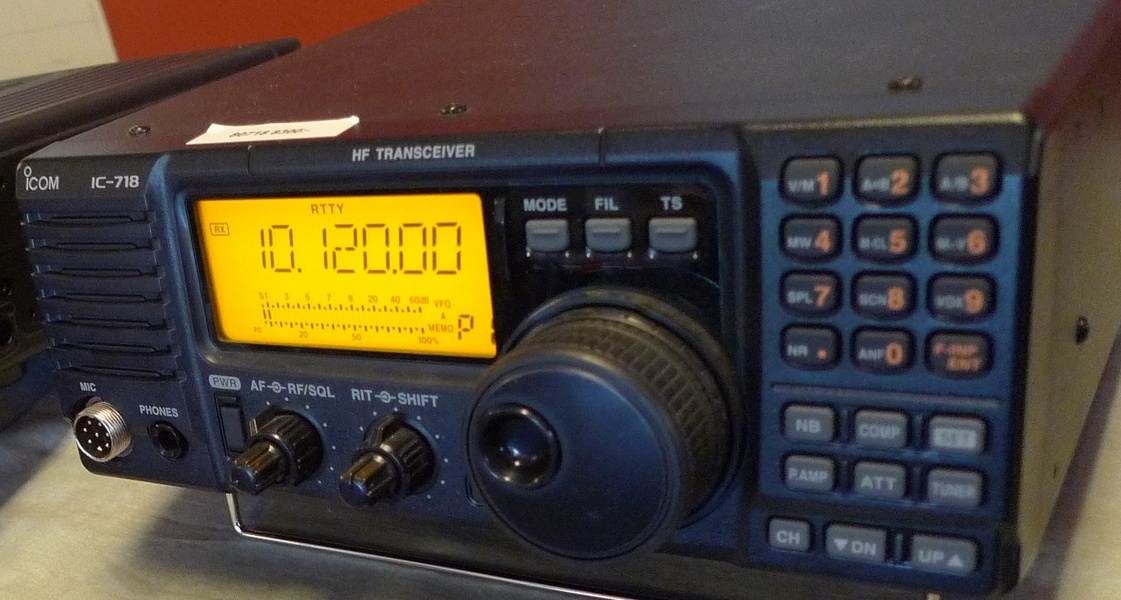
- The Icom IC-718
  TS-2000X, same as the above with the addition 1.2 GHz (23 cm band) capability;
- TS-B2000, a sleek "black box" unit requiring a computer or an optional mobile control panel for control
- TS-2000LE, limited production TS-2000 with a black finish to celebrate Kenwood's 60th Anniversary

===== Features =====
The TS-2000 was marketed as a feature-rich transceiver. As an "all-band" transceiver, the TS-2000 offers a maximum power output of 100 watts on the HF, 6 meters, and 2 meters bands, 50 watts on 70 centimeters, and, with the TS-2000X or the optional UT-20, 10 watts on the 1.2 GHz or 23 centimeters band. The (American version) radio's main receiver covers 30 kHz through 60 MHz, 142 MHz through 152 MHz, and 420 through 450 MHz (plus 1240 through 1300 MHz with the "X" model). The sub-receiver tunes between 118 and 174 MHz, and from 220 to 512 MHz (VFO ranges).

The radio's main receiver uses DSP at the IF level, so a very flexible selection of bandwidths are available without the purchase of mechanical filters, as was necessary on past radios.

It features backlit keys, a built-in TNC for receiving DX Packet Cluster information, and the Sky Command II+ system (found on the K-Model), which allows for remote control of the transceiver using Kenwood's TH-D7A handheld or TM-D700A mobile radio.

===== Firmware =====
Kenwood provides a firmware Update, Memory Control Program MCP-2000, and Radio Control Program ARCP-2000.

==== TS-820S ====
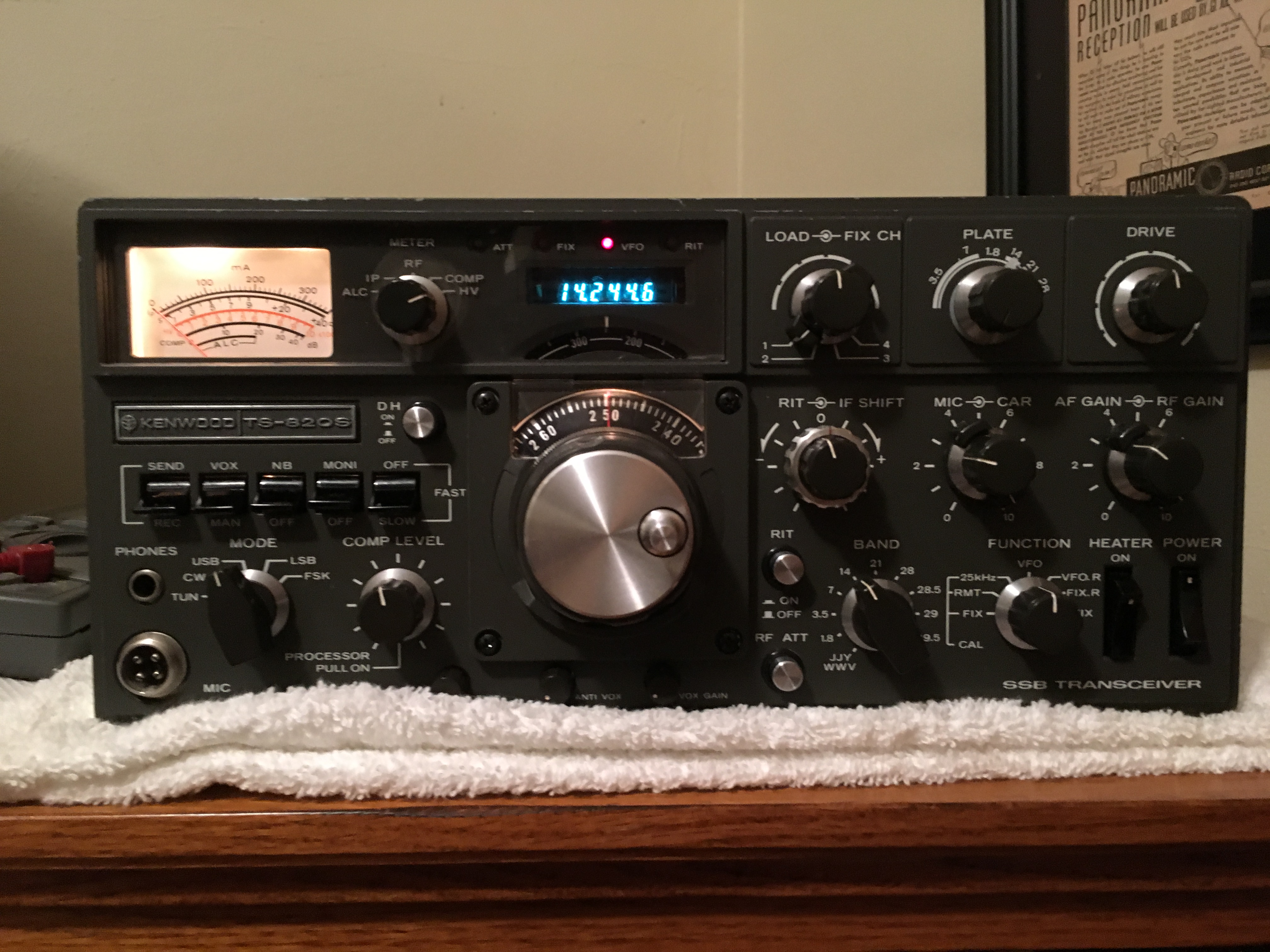
Kenwood TS-820S

The Kenwood TS-820S is a model of amateur radio transceiver produced primarily by the Kenwood Corporation from the late 1970s into the 1980s; some were produced by Trio Electronics before Kenwood's 1986 name change). The transceiver's predecessor was the TS-520, which began production a year earlier. The TS-820S was the second of three hybrid (including vacuum tubes and semiconductors) models produced by Kenwood during the 1970s and 1980s, and was noted for its quality. Its functionality and new hybrid technology made it one of the most popular transceivers marketed to amateurs in the late 1970s and early 1980s. The TS-820S has a built-in power supply, so it can be plugged directly into a 120 V wall outlet.

===== Variants =====
The TS-820 did not have an LED frequency counter, but was otherwise identical to the 820S. The TS-820S was the most sophisticated (and common) variant. The TS-820X, unavailable in the United States, was primarily produced in Japan.

===== Functions =====
The transceiver can transmit and receive on the HF 10-, 15-, 20-, 40-, 80- and 160-meter bands, and can receive WWV and WWVH on 15 MHz. It can use SSB, FSK and CW on all bands. The TS-820S' power consumption is 57 watts (with heaters on) when receiving and 292 watts when transmitting. The transceiver's peak envelope power output on SSB and CW is about 100 watts, and about 60 watts on FSK. Its tubes are tuned manually, using the transceiver's drive, plate and load controls.

===== General specifications =====
- Frequency range: 1.8–2.0 MHz, 3.5–4.0 MHz, 7.0–7.3 MHz, 14.0–14.35 MHz, 21.0–21.45 MHz, 28.0–28.5 MHz, 28.5–29.0 MHz, 29.0–29.5 MHz, 29.5–29.7 MHz; receives WWV and WWVH on 15 MHz
- Power supply: 120/220 VAC
- Modes (receive and transmit): LSB, USB, FSK, CW
- Power consumption: 57 watts (receive, heaters on); 292 watts (transmit)
- Antenna impedance: 50–75 ohms
- Antenna Connector: SO-239
- Weight: 35.2 pounds (16.0 kg)
- Dimensions: Width 333 millimetres (13.1 in), height 153 millimetres (6.0 in), depth 335 millimetres (13.2 in)
- Features: Digital frequency counter, VOX, noise blanker, receiver incremental tuning (RIT), IF shift, RF attenuation

===== Receiver and transmitter specifications =====
- Stability: Within 100 Hz in 30 minutes after the radio has warmed up, or up to 1 kHz in one hour after one minute of warm-up.
- Audio-frequency response: 400–2600 Hz within 6 dB
- Bandwidth: 2.4 kHz on SSB, 500 Hz on CW

== Midland ==
=== Handheld ===
- CT590 S (Analog VHF/UHF)
- CT990 EB (Analog VHF/UHF)

=== Mobile ===
- CT 2000 (Analog VHF/UHF)
- CT 3000 (Analog VHF/UHF)
- DBR 2500 (Analog VHF/UHF)

== Racal ==
=== Handheld ===
- Racal Cougar PRM-4515H

== Realistic ==
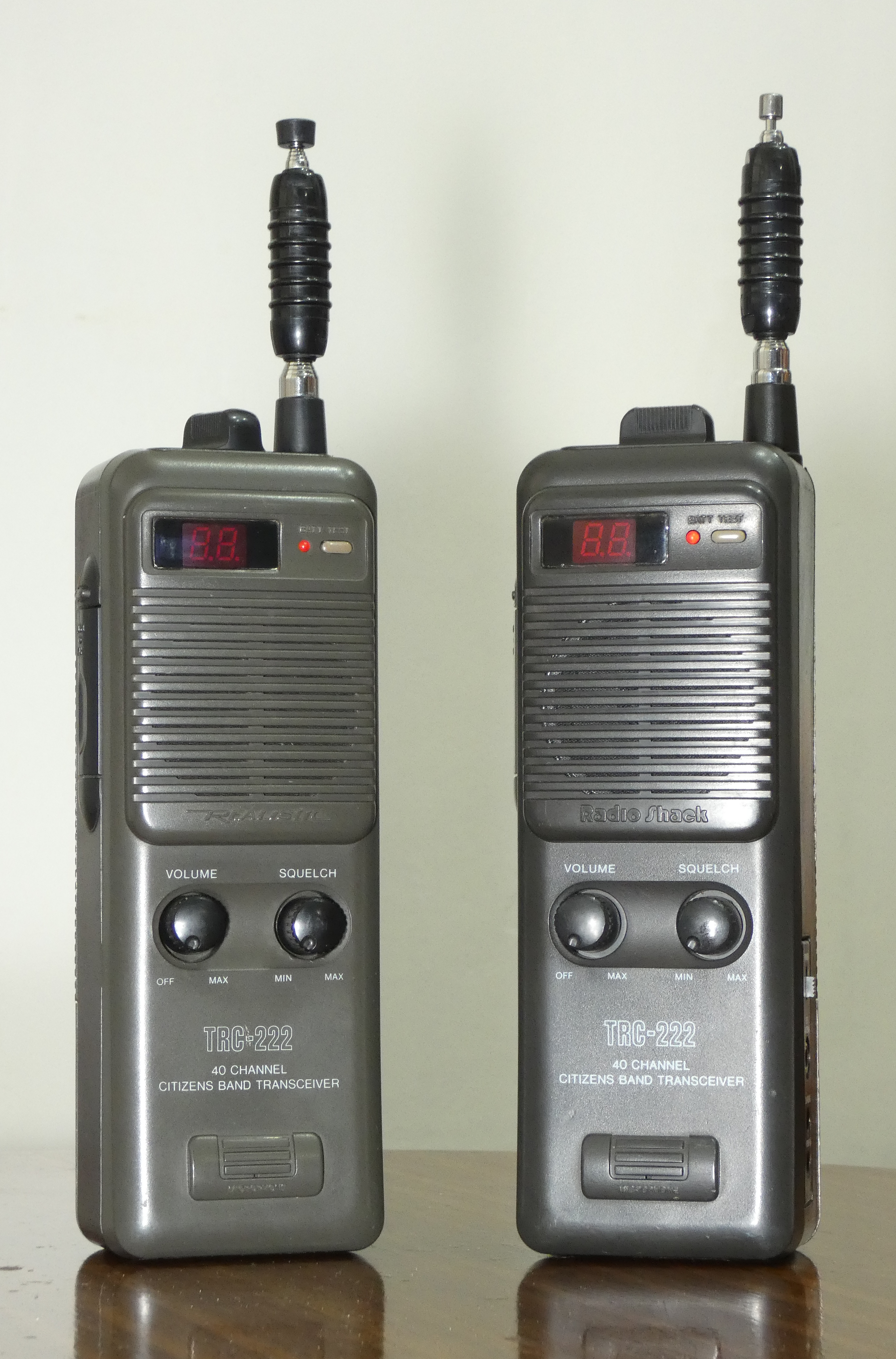
Realistic & Radio Shack TRC-222 radio transceivers

=== Handheld ===
- Realistic PRO-30
- Realistic TRC-222

=== Mobile ===
- Realistic DX-300
- Realistic Patrolman PRO-2026

== Retevis ==
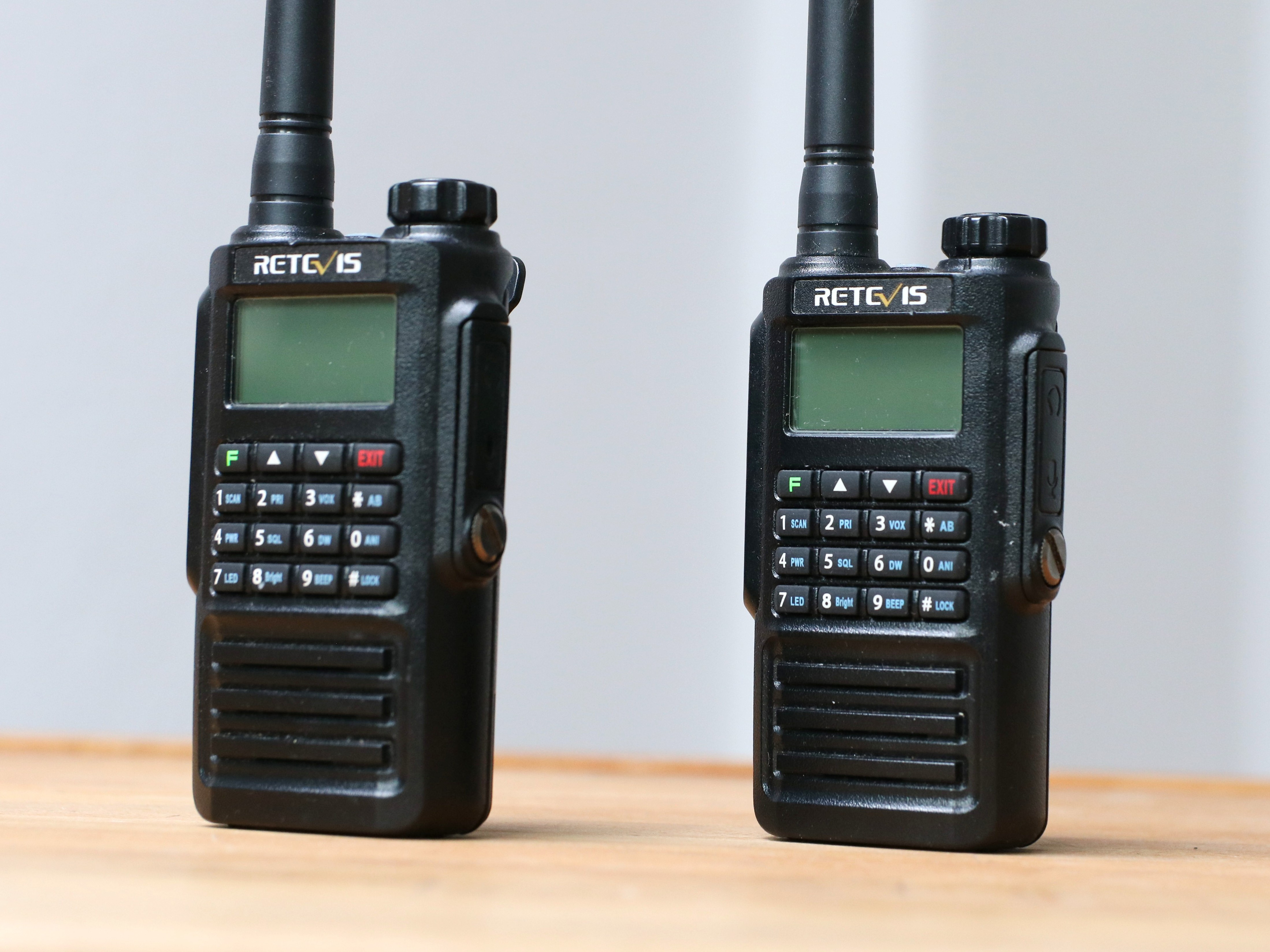
Retevis RT87 handheld radios

Retevis is the brand of chinese based company Shenzhen Retevis Technology Co., Ltd. headquartered in Shenzhen, China.

UHF/VHF radios:

- Retevis RA89 (7 Watt)
- Retevis RA685 (5 Watt)
- Retevis RT87 (5 Watt IP 66)
- Retevis RT95 (20 Watt mobile radio)
- Retevis RT3S (5 Watt DMR)

== TEAM Electronic ==
TEAM Electronic GmbH of Frankfurt Germany was established in 1980.

The Team ME-4 is a compact 80-channel CB radio featuring multi-standard capabilities and AM/FM operation. Key Features

- Channels: 80 channels (40 AM/FM UK/EU standards)
- Power: 12/24V power compatible
- Controls: Rotary channel change, manual squelch, and Automatic Squelch Control (ASC)

== Thunderpole ==
=== Mobile ===
- Thunderpole T-600
- Thunderpole T-800

=== Handheld ===
- Thunderpole T-X

== Uniden ==
=== Handheld ===
- Uniden Bearcat 50XL
- Uniden Bearcat SC180 Sportcat

=== Mobile ===
- Uniden PC78LTXFM
- Uniden Bearcat 980SSB
- Uniden Bearcat BC-560XLT
- Uniden Bearcat BC898T

== Wouxun ==
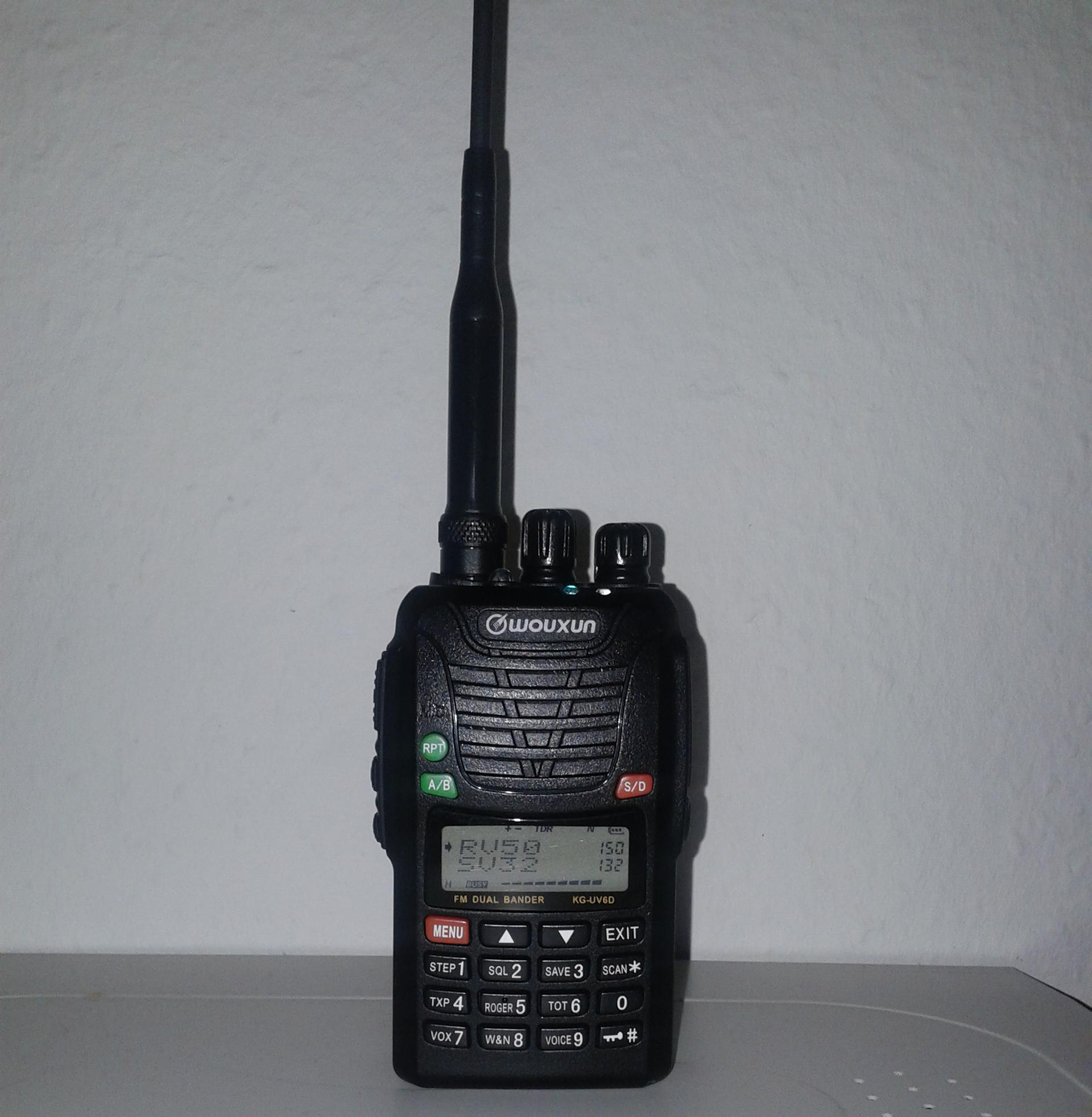
Wouxun KG-UV6D

Quanzhou Wouxun Electronics Co. Ltd. is a manufacturer of hand held radios from Quanzhou City, People's Republic of China.

The company was founded in 2000 to manufacture UHF/VHF radios.

- KG-UV6D
- KG-UV9D

== Xiegu ==
=== Mobile ===
- Xiegu G90
- Xiegu X6100
- Xiegu X6200
- Xiegu G7250

== Yaesu ==
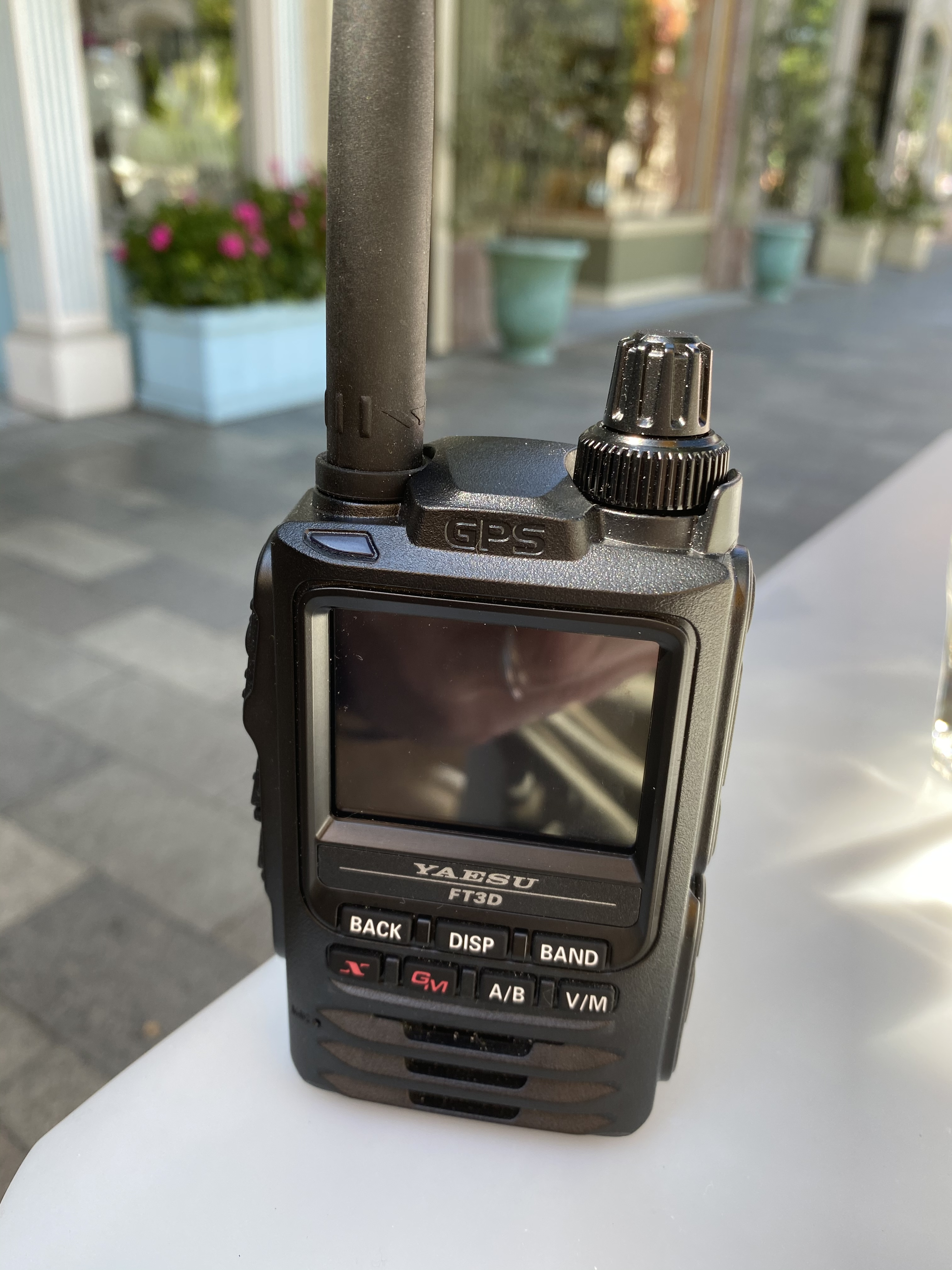
Yaesu FT-3DR

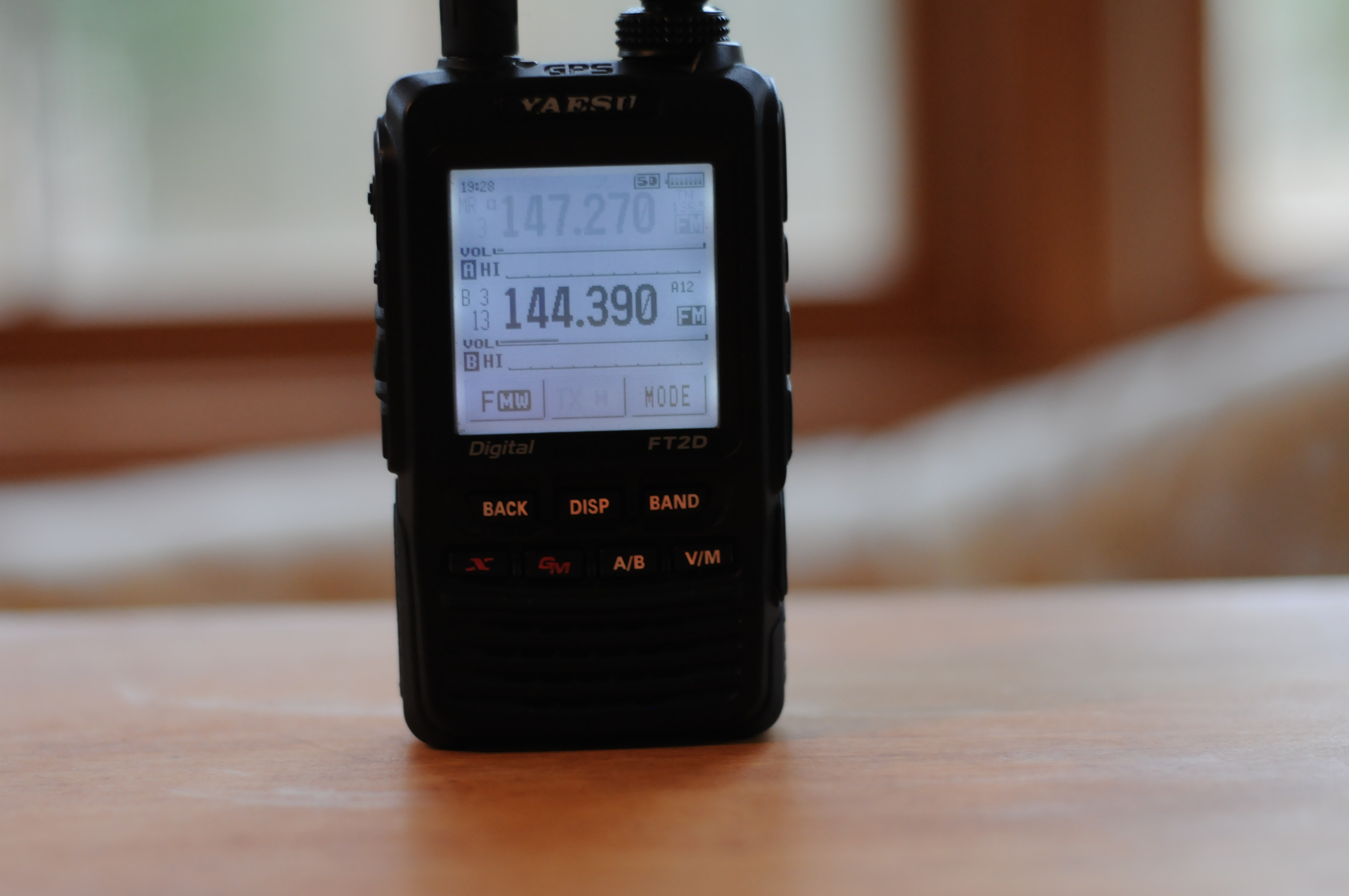
YAESU FT-2DR

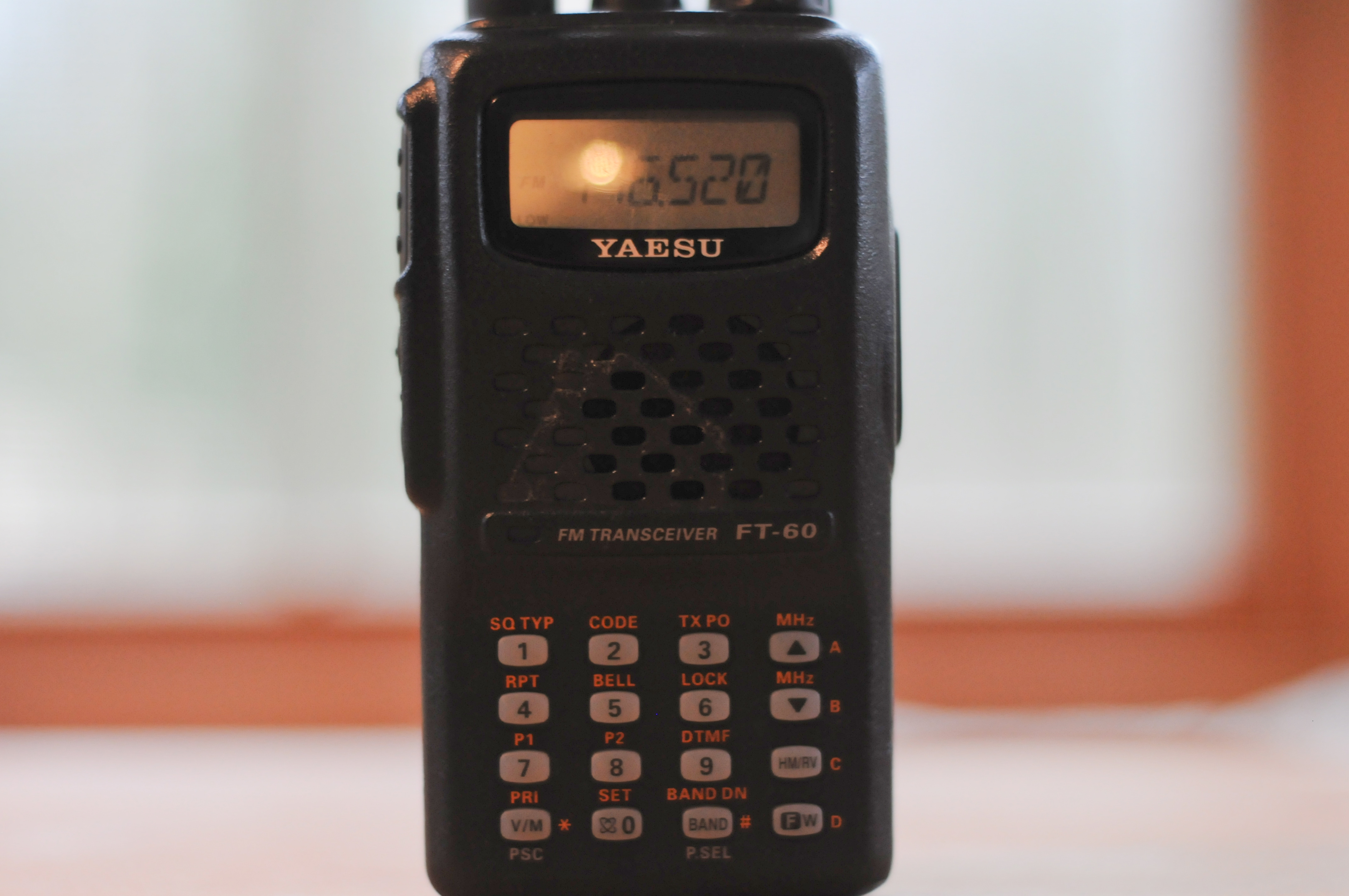
YAESU FT-60

=== Receivers and scanners ===
Model	Band/QRG	Mode	Year	Quicknote
FR-50	10-80 m	AM / SSB / CW	1966	
FR-50B	10-80 m	AM / SSB / CW	196x	
FR-100B	10-80 m	AM / FM / SSB / CW	1965	
FR-101	1.8-30 MHz	AM / SSB / CW / RTTY (FM)	197x	6 m and 2 m options
FR-101 Digital "FR-101D"	1.8-30 MHz	AM / SSB / CW / RTTY (FM)	197x	6 m and 2 m options
FR-101S	1.8-30 MHz	AM / SSB / CW / RTTY (FM)	197x	6 m and 2 m options
FRDX-400	1.7-30.1 MHz	AM / SSB / CW (FM)	1967	6 m and 2 m options
FRG-7	0.5-29.9 MHz	AM / SSB / CW	1976	
FRG-100	0.05-30 MHz	AM / SSB / CW	1992	FM option
FRG-965	60-905 MHz	AM / FM / WFM / SSB	198x	SSB up to 460 MHz only
FRG-7000	0.25-29.9 MHz	AM / SSB / CW	1977	
FRG-7700	0.15-30 MHz	AM / FM / SSB / CW	1981	
FRG-8800	0.15-30 MHz	AM / FM / SSB / CW	1985	118-174 MHz option
FRG-9600	60-905 MHz	AM / FM / WFM / SSB	1985	SSB up to 460 MHz only
VR-120	0.1-1300 MHz	AM / FM / WFM	2000	640 memories
VR-120D	0.1-1300 MHz	AM / FM / WFM	2001	640 memories
VR-160	0.1-1300 MHz	AM / FM / WFM	2010	1000+ memories
VR-500	0.1-1300 MHz	AM / FM / WFM / SSB / CW	1999	1000 memories
VR-5000	0.1-2600 MHz	AM / NAM / WAM / NFM / WFM / SSB / CW	2000	2000 memories

=== Transmitters ===
Model	Band/QRG	Mode	Max O/P	Year	Quicknote
FL-50	10-80 m	AM / SSB / CW	50 W	1966	FR-50 companion
FL-50B	10-80 m	AM / SSB / CW	50 W	196x	FR-50B companion
FL-100B	10-80 m	AM / SSB / CW	120 W	1965	FR-100B companion.
FL-101	10-160 m	AM / SSB / CW / FSK	200 W	1974	FR-101D or S companion.
FLDX-400	10-80 m	AM / SSB / CW	240 W	1967	FRDX-400 companion.

=== Handie-talkies and portables ===
Model	Band/QRG	Mode	Max O/P	Year	Quicknote
FT-1DE	2 m / 70 cm	FM / NFM / DV	5/5 W	2012	"Fusion" concept. RX: 0.5-999 MHz. Twin RX
FT-1DR	2 m / 70 cm	FM / NFM / DV	5/5 W	2012	"Fusion" concept. RX: 0.5-999 MHz (Less cellular). Twin RX
FT-1XDE	2 m / 70 cm	FM / NFM / DV	5/5 W	2015	"Fusion" concept. RX: 0.5-999 MHz. Twin RX
FT-1XDR	2 m / 70 cm	FM / NFM / DV	5/5 W	2015	"Fusion" concept. RX: 0.5-999 MHz (Less cellular) Twin RX
FT-2DE	2 m / 70 cm	FM / NFM / DV	5/5 W	2015	"Fusion" concept. RX: 0.5-999 MHz. Twin RX
FT-2DR	2 m / 70 cm	FM / NFM / DV	5/5 W	2015	"Fusion" concept. RX: 0.5-999 MHz (Less cellular). Twin RX
FT-3DE	2 m / 70 cm	FM / NFM / DV	5/5 W	2019	"Fusion" concept. RX: 0.5-999 MHz. Twin RX
FT-3DR	2 m / 70 cm	FM / NFM / DV	5/5 W	2019	"Fusion" concept. RX: 0.5-999 MHz (Less cellular). Twin RX
FT-4VE	2 m	FM	5 W	2018	
FT-4VR	2 m	FM	5 W	2018	
FT-4XE	2 m / 70 cm	FM	5/5 W	2018	
FT-4XR	2 m / 70 cm	FM	5/5 W	2018	
FT-5DE	2 m / 70 cm	FM / NFM / DV	5/5 W	2021	"Fusion" concept. RX: 0.5-999 MHz. Twin RX
FT-5DR	2 m / 70 cm	FM / NFM / DV	5/5 W	2021	"Fusion" concept. RX: 0.5-999 MHz (Less cellular). Twin RX
FT-10R	2 m	FM	5 W	1995	RX: 140-174 MHz
FT-11R	2 m	FM	5 W	1993	Keyboard. RX: 110-180 MHz AM/FM
FT-23R	2 m	FM	5 W	1986	
FT-25E	2 m	FM	5 W	2017	
FT-25R	2 m	FM	5 W	2017	
FT-26	2 m	FM	5 W	1991	RX: 140-174 MHz
FT-33R	1.25 m (222 MHz)	FM	5 W	1987	
FT-40R	70 cm	FM	5 W	1995	RX: 420-470 MHz
FT-41R	70 cm	FM	4.5 W	1993	Keyboard
FT-50R	2 m / 70 cm	FM	5/5 W	1996	Keyboard. RX: 76-200 / 300-540 / 590-999 MHz
FT-51R	2 m / 70 cm	FM	5/5 W	1994	
FT-60R	2 m / 70 cm	FM	5/5 W	2004	RX: 108-520 / 700-999 MHz
FT-65E	2 m / 70 cm	FM	5/5 W	2017	
FT-65R	2 m / 70 cm	FM	5/5 W	2017	
FT-70DE	2 m / 70 cm	FM / NFM / DV	5/5 W	2017	"Fusion" concept. RX: 108-580 MHz
FT-70DR	2 m / 70 cm	FM / NFM / DV	5/5 W	2017	"Fusion" concept. RX: 108-580 MHz
FT-73R	70 cm	FM	5 W	1986	
FT-76	70 cm	FM	5 W	1991	
FT-104	23 cm	FM	1 W	198x	Japanese domestic market
FT-109RH	1.25 m (222 MHz)	FM	5 W	198x	
FT-202R	2 m	FM	1 W	1978	XTAL
FT-203R	2 m	FM	2.5 W	1984	
FT-204	2 m	FM	5 W	198x	Japanese domestic market
FT-207R	2 m	FM	2.5 W	1979	
FT-208R	2 m	FM	2.5 W	1981	
FT-209R	2 m	FM	3.5 W	1984	
FT-209RH	2 m	FM	5 W	1984	
FT-250R(E)	2 m	FM	5 W	2009	RX: 136-174 MHz
FT-252	2 m	FM	5 W	2013	RX: 136-174 MHz
FT-257	70 cm	FM	5 W	2013	RX: 400-480 MHz
FT-270R(E)	2 m	FM	5 W	2009	RX: 136-174 MHz
FT-290	2 m	FM / SSB / CW	2.5 W	198x	Japanese domestic market
FT-290R	2 m	FM / SSB / CW	2.5 W	1981	
FT-290RII	2 m	FM / SSB / CW	2.5 W	1986	
FT-404R	70 cm	FM	1 W	1980	
FT-411	2 m	FM	5 W	198x	RX: 140-174 MHz
FT-411E	2 m	FM	5 W	1988	RX: 140-174 MHz
FT-411MKII	2 m	FM	5 W	1999	RX: 140-174 MHz
FT-415	2 m	FM	5 W	199x	RX: 130-174 MHz
FT-416	2 m	FM	5 W	1993	RX: 130-174 MHz
FT-470	2 m / 70 cm	FM	5/5 W	1989	Twin RX
FT-530	2 m / 70 cm	FM	5/5 W	1992	Twin RX
FT-690R	6 m	AM / FM / SSB / CW	2.5 W	198x	
FT-690RII	6 m	FM / SSB / CW	2.5 W	1986	
FT-703R	70 cm	FM	2.5 W	198x	
FT-708R	70 cm	FM	1 W	1981	
FT-709R	70 cm	FM	4 W	198x	
FT-727R	2 m / 70 cm	FM	5/5 W	1986	
FT-790R	70 cm	FM / SSB / CW	1 W	198x	
FT-790RII	70 cm	FM / SSB / CW	2.5 W	19xx	
FT-811	70 cm	FM	5 W	1990	
FT-815	70 cm	FM	5 W	199x	
FT-816	70 cm	FM	5 W	1993	
FT-817	10-160 m + WARC / 6 m / 2 m / 70 cm	AM / FM / NFM / SSB / CW	5/5/5/5 W	2000	RX: 0.1-56 / 76-154 / 420-470 MHz
FT-817ND	10-160 m + WARC and 60 m / 6 m / 2 m / 70 cm	AM / FM / NFM / SSB / CW	5/5/5/5 W	2004	RX: 0.1-56 / 76-154 / 420-470 MHz
FT-818ND	10-160 m + WARC and 60 m / 6 m / 2 m / 70 cm	AM / FM / NFM / SSB / CW	6/6/6/6 W	2018	RX: 0.1-56 / 76-154 / 420-470 MHz
FT-911	23 cm	FM	1 W	1990	
FT-2303	23 cm	FM	1 W	1986	
FTX-1 Field	10-160 m + WARC / 6 m / 2 m / 70 cm	AM / FM / SSB / CW / DV	10 W	2025	"Fusion" concept. Twin RX.
VX-1R	2 m / 70 cm	FM	1 / 1 W	1997	RX: 0.5-1.7 / 76-999 MHz
VX-2R	2 m / 70 cm	FM	3 / 2 W	2003	RX: 0.5-999 MHz
VX-3E	2 m / 70 cm	FM	1.5 / 1 W	2007	RX: 0.5-999 MHz
VX-3R	2 m / 70 cm	FM	1.5 / 1 W	2007	RX: 0.5-999 MHz
VX-5R	6 m / 2 m / 70 cm	FM	5/5/5 W	199x	RX: 0.5-16 / 48-729 / 800-999 MHz
VX-6E	2 m / 70 cm	FM	5/5 W	2005	RX: 0.5-999 MHz.
VX-6R	2 m / 1.25 m / 70 cm	FM	5/5 W	2005	RX: 0.5-999 MHz.
VX-7R	6 m / 2 m / (1.25 m) / 70 cm	FM	5/5/(0.3)/5 W	2002	RX: 0.5-999 MHz. Twin RX
VX-8DE	6 m / 2 m / 70 cm	FM	5/5/5 W	2010	Twin RX. APRS. Bluetooth and GPS options
VX-8DR	6 m / 2 m / 1.25 m / 70 cm	FM	5/5/1.5/5 W	2010	Twin RX. APRS. Bluetooth and GPS options
VX-8E	6 m / 2 m / 70 cm	FM	5/5/5 W	2008	Twin RX. APRS. Bluetooth and GPS options
VX-8GE	2 m / 70 cm	FM	5/5 W	2010	Twin RX. APRS. Built-in GPS
VX-8GR	2 m / 70 cm	FM	5/5 W	2010	Twin RX. APRS. Built-in GPS
VX-8R	6 m / 2 m / 1.25 m / 70 cm	FM	5/5/1.5/5 W	2008	Twin RX. APRS. Bluetooth and GPS options
VX-10R	Fake!	Fake!	Fake!	Fake!	Fake!
VX-110	2 m	FM	5 W	1999	RX: 140-174 MHz
VX-120	2 m	FM	5 W	2005	RX: 137-174 MHz
VX-150	2 m	FM	5 W	2000	DTMF keypad. RX: 140-174 MHz
VX-170	2 m	FM	5 W	2005	DTMF keypad. RX: 137-174 MHz
VX-177	70 cm	FM	5 W	2005	DTMF keypad.

=== Mobile VHF/UHF ===
Model	Band/QRG	Mode	Max O/P	Year	Quicknote
CPU-2500R	2 m	FM	25 W	1979	
FT-2F	2 m	FM	10 W	1971	XTAL
FT-2 Auto	2 m	FM	10 W	1972	XTAL
FT-90R	2 m / 70 cm	FM	50/35 W	1999	RX: 100-230 / 300-530 / 810-1000 MHz
FT-127	1.25 m (220 MHz)	FM	10 W	197x	XTAL
FT-127RA "Memorizer"	1.25 m (220 MHz)	FM	10 W	197x	
FT-211RH	2 m	FM	45 W	1987	
FT-212RH	2 m	FM	45 W	1988	
FT-215	2 m	FM	10 W	1993	Japanese domestic market
FT-215M	2 m	FM	25 W	1993	Japanese domestic market
FT-215H	2 m	FM	50 W	1993	Japanese domestic market
FT-224	2 m	FM	10 W	197x	XTAL
FT-227 "Memorizer"	2 m	FM	10 W	1977	Japanese domestic market
FT-227R "Memorizer"	2 m	FM	10 W	1977	
FT-227RA "Memorizer"	2 m	FM	10 W	1979	
FT-227RB "Memorizer"	2 m	FM	10 W	1979	
FT-230R	2 m	FM	25 W	1983	
FT-270R	2 m	FM	25 W	1985	
FT-270RH	2 m	FM	45 W	1985	
FT-311RM	1.25 m (220 MHz)	FM	25 W	199x	
FT-480R	2 m	FM / SSB / CW	10 W	1980	
FT-627A "Memorizer"	6 m	FM	10 W	197x	Japanese domestic market
FT-627RA "Memorizer"	6 m	FM	10 W	197x	
FT-680R	6 m	AM / FM / SSB / CW	10 W	19xx	
FT-711RH	70 cm	FM	35 W	1987	
FT-712RH	70 cm	FM	35 W	198x	
FT-715	70 cm	FM	10 W	1993	Japanese domestic market
FT-715M	70 cm	FM	25 W	1993	Japanese domestic market
FT-715H	70 cm	FM	35 W	1993	Japanese domestic market
FT-720R	2 m / 70 cm	FM	25/10 W	1980	
FT-730R	70 cm	FM	10 W	1983	
FT-770RH	70 cm	FM	25 W	198x	
FT-780R	70 cm	FM / SSB / CW	10 W	1981	
FT-912R	23 cm	FM	10 W	1990	
FT-1500M	2 m	FM	50 W	2000	RX: 134-174 MHz
FT-1802M(E)	2 m	FM	50 W	2005	RX: 136-174 MHz
FT-1900R(E)	2 m	FM	55 W	2009	RX: 136-174 MHz
FT-2200	2 m	FM	50 W	1993	
FT-2311R	23 cm	FM	10 W	198x	
FT-2312	23 cm	FM	10 W	1993	
FT-2400H	2 m	FM	50 W	1990	RX: 140-174 MHz
FT-2500M	2 m	FM	50 W	199x	RX: 140-174 MHz
FT-2600M	2 m	FM	60 W	1999	RX: 134-174 MHz
FT-2700R	2 m / 70 cm	FM	10/10 W	1985	Japanese domestic market
FT-2700RH	2 m / 70 cm	FM	25/25 W	1985	
FT-2800M	2 m	FM	65 W	2003	RX: 137-174 MHz
FT-2900R	2 m	FM / NFM	75 W	2009	RX: 136-174 MHz
FT-2980E	2 m	FM / NFM	80 W	2017	RX: 136-174 MHz
FT-2980R	2 m	FM / NFM	80 W	2017	RX: 136-174 MHz
FT-3000M	2 m	FM	50 W	1996	Twin RX
FT-3165E ASP	2 m	FM / NFM	65 W	2024	RX: 136-174 MHz
FT-3165R ASP	2 m	FM / NFM	65 W	2024	RX: 136-174 MHz
FT-3185E ASP	2 m	FM / NFM	85 W	2024	RX: 136-174 MHz
FT-3185R ASP	2 m	FM / NFM	85 W	2024	RX: 136-174 MHz
FT-3700	2 m / 70 cm	FM	10/10 W	1986	Japanese domestic market
FT-3700H	2 m / 70 cm	FM	25/25 W	1986	Japanese domestic market
FT-3800	2 m	FM	10 W	198x	Japanese domestic market
FT-3800H	2 m	FM	45 W	198x	Japanese domestic market
FT-3900	70 cm	FM	10 W	198x	Japanese domestic market
FT-3900H	70 cm	FM	25 W	198x	Japanese domestic market
FT-4600	2 m / 70 cm	FM	10/10 W	1992	Twin RX. Japanese domestic market
FT-4600H	2 m / 70 cm	FM	50/35 W	1992	Twin RX. Japanese domestic market
FT-4600M	2 m / 70 cm	FM	25/25 W	1992	Twin RX. Japanese domestic market
FT-4700RH	2 m / 70 cm	FM	50/40 W	1989	Twin RX
FT-4800	2 m / 70 cm	FM	10/10 W	199x	Twin RX. Japanese domestic market
FT-4800H	2 m / 70 cm	FM	50/35 W	199x	Twin RX. Japanese domestic market
FT-4800M	2 m / 70 cm	FM	25/25 W	199x	Twin RX. Japanese domestic market
FT-4900	2 m / 70 cm	FM	10/10 W	1992	Twin RX. Japanese domestic market
FT-4900H	2 m / 70 cm	FM	50/35 W	1992	Twin RX. Japanese domestic market
FT-4900M	2 m / 70 cm	FM	25/25 W	1992	Twin RX. Japanese domestic market
FT-5100	2 m / 70 cm	FM	50/35 W	1992	Twin RX
FT-5200	2 m / 70 cm	FM	50/35 W	1991	Twin RX
FT-5800	70 cm / 23 cm	FM	10/10 W	199x	Twin RX. Japanese domestic market
FT-5800H	70 cm / 23 cm	FM	35/10 W	199x	Twin RX. Japanese domestic market
FT-5800M	70 cm / 23 cm	FM	25/10 W	199x	Twin RX. Japanese domestic market
FT-6200	70 cm / 23 cm	FM	35/10 W	1991	Twin RX
FT-7100M	2 m / 70 cm	FM	50/35 W	2001	RX: 108-180 / 320-480 / 810-1000 MHz. Twin RX
FT-7200	70 cm	FM	35 W	1993	
FT-7400H	70 cm	FM	35 W	199x	RX: 420-470 MHz
FT-7800 (Older)	2 m / 70 cm / 23 cm	FM	?/?/10 W	1992	Triple RX. Japanese domestic market
FT-7800R(E)	2 m / 70 cm	FM	50/40 W	2003	
FT-7900E	2 m / 70 cm	FM	50/45 W	2009	RX: 108-520 / 700-990 MHz
FT-7900R	2 m / 70 cm	FM	50/45 W	2009	RX: 108-520 / 700-990 MHz
FT-8000R	2 m / 70 cm	FM	50/35 W	2003	RX: 110-550 / 750-1300 MHz. Twin RX
FT-8100	2 m / 70 cm	FM	20/20 W	1997	Twin RX. Japanese domestic market
FT-8100R	2 m / 70 cm	FM	50/35 W	1997	Twin RX
FT-8500	2 m / 70 cm	FM	50/35 W	1995	Twin RX
FT-8800R	2 m / 70 cm	FM	50/35 W	2003	Twin RX
FTM-10R(E)	2 m / 70 cm	FM	50/40 W	2007	Bluetooth
FTM-100DE	2 m / 70 cm	FM / NFM / DV	50/50 W	2015	"Fusion" concept. RX: 108-999 MHz. GPS/APRS
FTM-100DR	2 m / 70 cm	FM / NFM / DV	50/50 W	2015	"Fusion" concept. RX: 108-999 MHz. GPS/APRS
FTM-150E ASP	2 m / 70 cm	FM / NFM	55 / 50 W	2024	RX: 108-550 MHz. Twin RX
FTM-150R ASP	2 m / 70 cm	FM / NFM	55 / 50 W	2024	RX: 108-550 MHz. Twin RX
FTM-200DE	2 m / 70 cm	FM / NFM / DV	50/50 W	2022	"Fusion" concept. GPS. Bluetooth.
FTM-200DR	2 m / 70 cm	FM / NFM / DV	50/50 W	2022	"Fusion" concept. GPS. Bluetooth.
FTM-300DE	2 m / 70 cm	FM / NFM / DV	50/50 W	2020	"Fusion" concept. GPS. Bluetooth. Twin RX
FTM-300DR	2 m / 70 cm	FM / NFM / DV	50/50 W	2020	"Fusion" concept. GPS. Bluetooth. Twin RX
FTM-350R	2 m / 70 cm	FM / NFM	50/50 W	2009	GPS/APRS. Bluetooth. Twin RX
FTM-400DE	2 m / 70 cm	FM / NFM / DV	50/50 W	2012	"Fusion" concept. Touch screen. GPS/APRS. Bluetooth. Twin RX
FTM-400DR	2 m / 70 cm	FM / NFM / DV	50/50 W	2012	"Fusion" concept. Touch screen. GPS/APRS. Bluetooth. Twin RX
FTM-400XDE	2 m / 70 cm	FM / NFM / DV	50/50 W	2015	"Fusion" concept. Touch screen. GPS/APRS. Bluetooth. Twin RX
FTM-400XDR	2 m / 70 cm	FM / NFM / DV	50/50 W	2015	"Fusion" concept. Touch screen. GPS/APRS. Bluetooth. Twin RX
FTM-500DE	2 m / 70 cm	FM / NFM / DV	50/50 W	2023	"Fusion II" concept. Touch screen. GPS/APRS. Bluetooth. Twin RX
FTM-500DR	2 m / 70 cm	FM / NFM / DV	50/50 W	2023	"Fusion II" concept. Touch screen. GPS/APRS. Bluetooth. Twin RX
FTM-510DE ASP	2 m / 70 cm	FM / NFM / DV	55/50 W	2025	"Fusion II" concept. Touch screen. GPS/APRS. Bluetooth. Twin RX
FTM-510DR ASP	2 m / 70 cm	FM / NFM / DV	55/50 W	2025	"Fusion II" concept. Touch screen. GPS/APRS. Bluetooth. Twin RX
FTM-3100E	2 m	FM / NFM	65 W	2016	RX: 136-174 MHz
FTM-3100R	2 m	FM / NFM	65 W	2016	RX: 136-174 MHz
FTM-3200DE	2 m	FM / NFM / DV	65 W	2016	"Fusion" concept
FTM-3200DR	2 m	FM / NFM / DV	65 W	2016	"Fusion" concept
FTM-6000E	2 m / 70 cm	FM / NFM	50/50 W	2021	RX: 108-1000 MHz. Bluetooth.
FTM-6000R	2 m / 70 cm	FM / NFM	50/50 W	2021	RX: 108-1000 MHz. Bluetooth.
Sigmasizer 200R	2 m	FM	10 W	1974	

=== Base VHF/UHF ===
Model	Band/QRG	Mode	Max O/P	Year	Quicknote
FT-220	2 m	FM / SSB / CW	10 W	1974	
FT-221	2 m	AM / FM / SSB / CW	14 W	1975	Analog display
FT-221R	2 m	AM / FM / SSB / CW	14 W	1976	Analog display
FT-225R	2 m	AM / FM / SSB / CW	25 W	1978	Analog display
FT-225RD	2 m	AM / FM / SSB / CW	25 W	1978	Digital display
FT-620	6 m	AM / SSB / CW	? W	1972	
FT-620B	6 m	AM / SSB / CW	20 W	1976	
FT-625D	6 m	AM / FM / SSB / CW	10 W	197x	Digital display. Japanese domestic market
FT-625R	6 m	AM / FM / SSB / CW	25 W	1978	Analog display
FT-625RD	6 m	AM / FM / SSB / CW	25 W	1978	Digital display
FT-726R	2 m	FM / SSB / CW	10 W	1983	6 m and 70 cm options
FT-736MX	2 m / 70 cm	FM / SSB / CW	25/25 W	198x	6 m and 23cm options. Japanese domestic market
FT-736R	2 m / 70 cm	FM / SSB / CW	25/25 W	1987	1.25 m, 6 m and 23 cm options

=== HF and other ===
Model	Band/QRG	Mode	Max O/P	Year	Quicknote
FT-One	10-160 m + WARC	AM / SSB / CW / FSK	100 W	1981	FM option. RX: 0.15-30 MHz
FT-7	10-80 m	SSB / CW	10 W	197x	
FT-7B	10-80 m	AM / SSB / CW	50 W	1979	
FT-50	10-80 m	AM / SSB / CW	50 W	1967	
FT-75	10-80 m	SSB / CW	20 W	1971	VXO
FT-75B	10-80 m	SSB / CW	60 W	197x	VXO
FT-77	10-80 m + WARC	FM / SSB / CW	100 W	1983	
FT-100 (Older)	10-80 m	AM / SSB / CW	60 W	1966	
FT-100	10-160 m + WARC / 6 m / 2 m / 70 cm	AM / FM / SSB / CW	100/100/50/20 W	1998	DSP. RX: 0.1-970 MHz
FT-100D	10-160 m + WARC / 6 m / 2 m / 70 cm	AM / FM / SSB / CW	100/100/50/20 W	2000	DSP. RX: 0.1-970 MHz
FT-101	10-80 m	AM / SSB / CW	100 W	1970	Tube hybrid
FT-101B	10-160 m	AM / SSB / CW	100 W	1973	Tube hybrid
FT-101BS	10-160 m	AM / SSB / CW	50 W	1973	Tube hybrid. Japanese domestic market
FT-101E	10-160 m	AM / SSB / CW	100 W	1975	Tube hybrid
FT-101EE	10-160 m	AM / SSB / CW	100 W	1976	Tube hybrid
FT-101ES	10-160 m	AM / SSB / CW	50 W	197x	Tube hybrid. Japanese domestic market
FT-101EX	10-160 m	AM / SSB / CW	100 W	197x	Tube hybrid
FT-101F	10-160 m	AM / SSB / CW	100 W	197x	Tube hybrid
FT-101FE	10-160 m	AM / SSB / CW	100 W	197x	Tube hybrid
FT-101FX	10-160 m	AM / SSB / CW	100 W	1977	Tube hybrid
FT-101TT	Fake!	Fake!	Fake!	Fake!	Fake!
FT-101Z (Mk0)	10-160 m	SSB / CW	100 W	1979	Tube hybrid. Analog readout
FT-101ZD (Mk0)	10-160 m	SSB / CW	100 W	1979	Tube hybrid. Digital readout
FT-101ZD (Mk1)	10-160 m	AM / SSB / CW	100 W	1980	Tube hybrid. Digital readout
FT-101ZD (Mk2)	10-160 m + WARC	AM / SSB / CW	100 W	1980	Tube hybrid. Digital readout
FT-101ZD (Mk3)	10-160 m + WARC	SSB / CW	100 W	1981	Tube hybrid. AM or FM option. Digital readout
FT-102	10-160 m + WARC	AM / SSB / CW	100 W	1982	FM option. Tube hybrid
FT-107M	10-160 m (+ WARC)	AM / SSB / CW / FSK	100 W	1980	
FT-107SM	10-160 m (+ WARC)	AM / SSB / CW / FSK	10 W	1980	
FT-200	10-80 m	AM / SSB / CW	100 W	1969	Tube hybrid
FT-201	10-80 m	AM / SSB / CW	100 W	1973	Tube hybrid
FT-201S	10-80 m	AM / SSB / CW	10 W	1973	Tube hybrid
FT-301	10-160 m	AM / SSB / CW	100 W	197x	Analog readout
FT-301D	10-160 m	AM / SSB / CW	100 W	197x	Digital readout
FT-301S	10-160 m	AM / SSB / CW	10 W	197x	Analog readout
FT-301SD	10-160 m	AM / SSB / CW	10 W	197x	Digital readout
FT-401B	10-80 m	AM / SSB / CW	250 W	197x	
FT-410	10-160 m + WARC	AM / SSB / CW	100 W	2015	RX: 0.03-30 MHz. Never in production!
FT-450	10-160 m + WARC / 6 m	AM / FM / SSB / CW	100/100 W	2008	
FT-450D	10-160 m + WARC / 6 m	AM / FM / SSB / CW	100/100 W	201x	
FT-501	10-80 m	SSB / CW	300 W	1975	
FT-600 (System 600)	10-160 m + WARC	AM / SSB / CW	100 W	2000	
FT-650	6 / 10 / 12 m	AM / FM / SSB / CW	100 W	199x	
FT-655	6 / 10 / 12 m	AM / FM / SSB / CW	50 W	199x	Japanese domestic market
FT-655S	6 / 10 / 12 m	AM / FM / SSB / CW	10 W	199x	Japanese domestic market
FT-707	10-80 m + WARC	AM / SSB / CW	100 W	1980	
FT-707S	10-80 m + WARC	AM / SSB / CW	10 W	1980	
FT-710 (AESS)	10-160 m + WARC / 6 m / (4 m)	AM / FM / SSB / CW	100/100/(100) W	2022	RX: 0.03-75 MHz
FT-747GX	10-160 m + WARC	AM / SSB / CW	100 W	1987	FM option. RX: 0.1-30 MHz. 1988
FT-747SX	10-160 m + WARC	AM / SSB / CW	10 W	1987	FM option. RX: 0.1-30 MHz
FT-757GX	10-160 m + WARC	AM / FM / SSB / CW	100 W	1983	RX: General coverage
FT-757GXII	10-160 m + WARC	AM / FM / SSB / CW	100 W	1987	RX: General coverage
FT-767GX	10-160 m + WARC	AM / FM / SSB / CW / AFSK	100 W	1986	RX: 0.1-30 MHz, 6 m, 2 m and 70 cm options
FT-840	10-160 m + WARC	AM / SSB / CW	100 W	1993	RX: 0.1-30 MHz. FM option
FT-847	10-160 m + WARC / 6 m /2 m / 70 cm	AM / FM / SSB / CW	100/100/50/50 W	1998	RX: 0.1-512 MHz with gaps
FT-857	10-160 m + WARC / 6 m / 2 m / 70 cm	AM / FM / SSB / CW (WFM RX)	100/100/50/20 W	2003	DSP option
FT-857D	10-160 m + WARC and 60 m / 6 m / 2 m / 70 cm	AM / FM / SSB / CW (WFM RX)	100/100/50/20 W	2004	DSP
FT-890	10-160 m + WARC	AM / FM / SSB / CW	100 W	1992	RX: 0.1-30 MHz
FT-891	10-160 m + WARC / 6 m	AM / FM / SSB / CW	100/100 W	2016	32-bit IF DSP
FT-897	10-160 m + WARC / 6 m /2 m / 70 cm	AM / FM / SSB / CW (WFM RX)	100/100/50/20 W	2001	DSP
FT-897D	10-160 m + WARC and 60 m / 6 m / 2 m / 70 cm	AM / FM / SSB / CW (WFM RX)	100/100/50/20 W	2004	DSP and TXCO
FT-898A	Fake!	Fake!	Fake!		Fake!
FT-900	10-160 m + WARC	AM / FM / SSB / CW	100 W	1994	Detachable head. RX: 0.1-30 MHz
FT-901D	10-160 m	AM / FM / SSB / CW / FSK	100 W	1978	
FT-901DE	10-160 m	AM / SSB / CW / FSK	100 W	1978	FM option
FT-901DM	10-160 m	AM / FM / SSB / CW / FSK	100 W	1978	
FT-901SD	10-160 m	AM / SSB / CW / FSK	10 W	1978	FM option
FT-902D	10-160 m + WARC	AM / FM / SSB / CW / FSK	100 W	1981	
FT-902DM	10-160 m + WARC	AM / FM / SSB / CW / FSK	100 W	1981	
FT-920	10-160 m + WARC / 6 m	AM / SSB / CW	100/100 W	1997	RX: 0.1-30/48-56 MHz. FM option. DSP
FT-950	10-160 m + WARC / 6 m	AM / FM / NFM / SSB / CW / RTTY / Packet	100/100 W	2007	RX: 0.03-56 MHz. IF-DSP
FT-980	10-160 m + WARC	AM / FM / SSB / CW	100 W	1983	RX: 0.15-30 MHz
FT-990	10-160 m + WARC	AM / FM / SSB / CW / FSK	100 W	1991	RX: 0.1-30 MHz
FT-991	10-160 m + WARC / 6 m / 2 m / 70 cm	AM / FM / SSB / CW / RTTY / PSK / DV	100/50/50 W	2015	"Fusion" concept. 32-bit IF DSP
FT-991A	10-160 m + WARC / 6 m / 2 m / 70 cm	AM / FM / SSB / CW / RTTY / PSK / DV	100/50/50 W	2016	"Fusion" concept. 32-bit IF DSP
FT-1000(D)	10-160 m + WARC	AM / FM / SSB / CW / RTTY / Packet	200 W	1990	RX: 0.1-30 MHz, Twin RX
FT-1000MP	10-160 m + WARC	AM / FM / SSB / CW / RTTY / Packet	100 W	1995	RX: 0.1-30 MHz, Twin RX
FT-1000MP Mark V	10-160 m + WARC	AM / FM / SSB / CW / RTTY / Packet	200 W	2000	RX: 0.1-30 MHz, Twin RX
FT-1000MP Mark V Field	10-160 m + WARC	AM / FM / SSB / CW / RTTY / Packet	100 W	2002	RX: 0.1-30 MHz, Twin RX
FT-2000	10-160 m + WARC / 6 m	AM / FM / SSB / CW / RTTY / Packet	100 W	2007	Twin RX
FT-2000D	10-160 m + WARC / 6 m	AM / FM / SSB / CW / RTTY / Packet	200 W	2007	Twin RX
FT-8900R	10 m / 6 m / 2 m / 70 cm	FM / NFM	50/50/50/35 W	2002	Twin RX
FTDX-10	10-160 m + WARC / 6 m	AM / FM / SSB / CW / RTTY / PSK	100/100 W	2020	RX: 0.03-75 MHz. Hybrid SDR
FTDX-100	10-80 m	AM / SSB / CW	65 W	1967	
FTDX-101D	10-160 m + WARC and 60 m / 6 m (4 m)	AM / FM / SSB / CW / RTTY / PSK	100/100 W	2017	SDR hybrid
FTDX-101MP	10-160 m + WARC and 60 m / 6 m (4 m)	AM / FM / SSB / CW / RTTY / PSK	200/200 W	2019	SDR hybrid
FTDX-400	10-80 m	AM / SSB / CW	250 W	1967	
FTDX-401	10-80 m	SSB / CW	250 W	1971	
FTDX-560	10-80 m	SSB / CW	250 W	1969	
FTDX-570	10-80 m	SSB / CW	250 W	1972	
FTDX-1200	10-160 m + WARC / 6 m	AM / FM / NFM / SSB / CW / RTTY / Packet	100/100 W	2013	RX: 0.03-56 MHz
FTDX-3000	10-160 m + WARC / 6 m	AM / FM / SSB / CW / RTTY / Packet	100/100 W	2012	RX: 0.03-56 MHz
FTDX-5000	10-160 m + WARC / 6 m	AM / FM / SSB / CW / RTTY / Packet	200/200 W	2009	RX: 0.03-60 MHz. Twin RX
FTDX-5000D	10-160 m + WARC / 6 m	AM / FM / SSB / CW / RTTY / Packet	200/200 W	2009	RX: 0.03-60 MHz. Twin RX
FTDX-5000MP	10-160 m + WARC / 6 m	AM / FM / SSB / CW / RTTY / Packet	200/200 W	2009	RX: 0.03-60 MHz. Twin RX
FTDX-9000 Contest	10-160 m + WARC / 6 m	AM / FM / SSB / CW / RTTY / Packet	200 W	2005	
FTDX-9000D	10-160 m + WARC / 6 m	AM / FM / SSB / CW / RTTY / Packet	200 W	2005	
FTDX-9000MP	10-160 m + WARC / 6 m	AM / FM / SSB / CW / RTTY / Packet	400 W	2005	
FTX-1 Optima	10-160 m + WARC / 6 m / 2 m / 70 cm	AM / FM / SSB / CW / DV	100 / 100 / 50 / 50 W	2025	"Fusion" concept. Twin RX.

=== Remarkable models ===
==== FT-221 ====
The FT-221 is a modular VHF 2M all mode (SSB, AM, CW and FM) amateur radio transceiver, produced during the 1970s.

Technical description

- Frequency range 144.0 MHz ~ 148.0 MHz
- Emission: AM FM SSB (LSB and USB) and CW
- Power output:

- SSB 12 watts PEP
- FM, CW 14 watts
- AM 2.5 watts

Other model variants

The FT221R is a model with repeater shift. The FT221RDalso has a digital display.

==== FT-857 ====
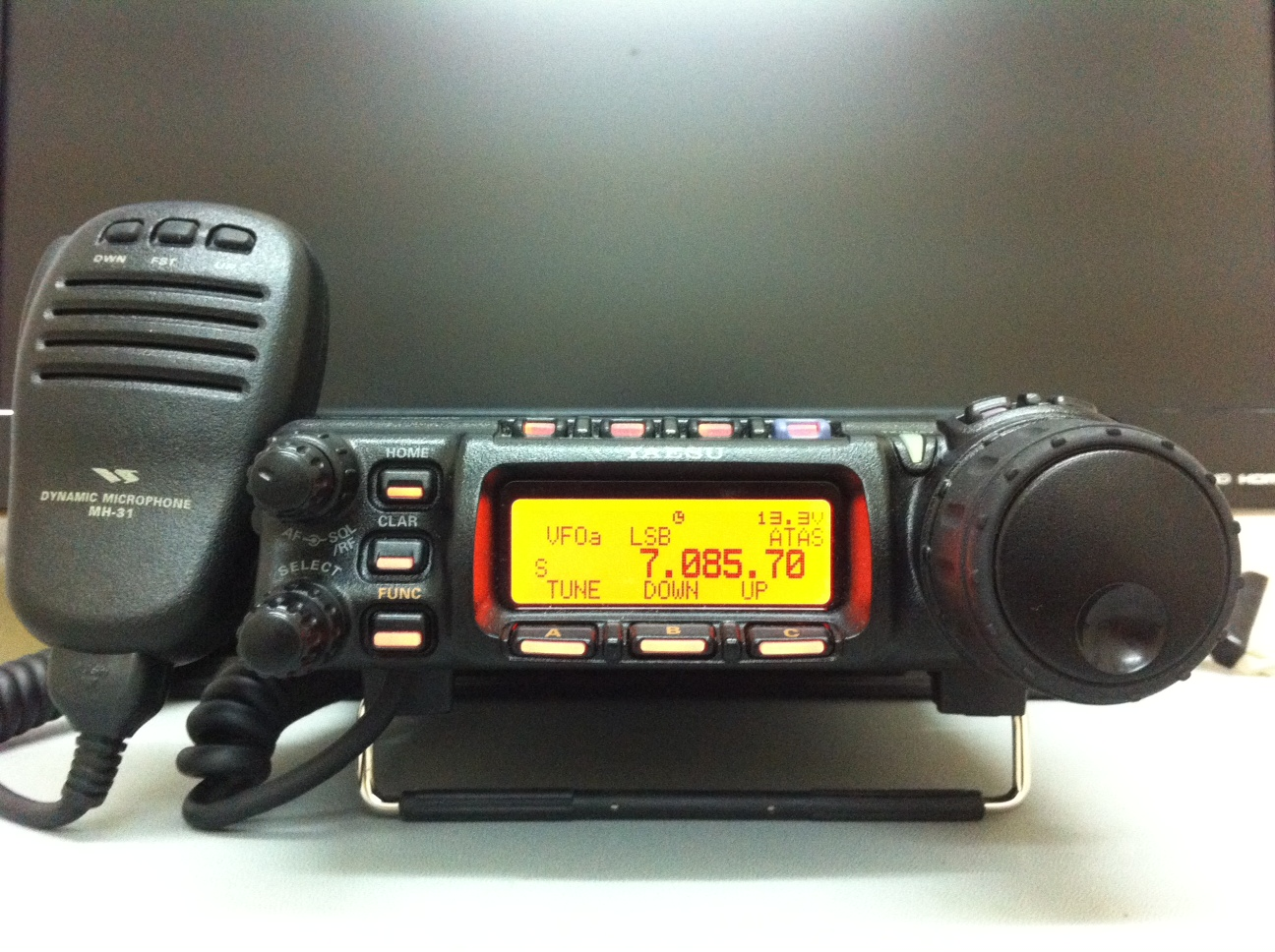
FT-857

The Yaesu FT-857 is one of the smallest MF/HF/VHF/UHF multimode general-coverage amateur radio transceivers. The set is built by the Japanese Vertex Standard Corporation and is sold under the Yaesu brand.

The FT-857 is developed on the FT-897 and MARK-V FT-1000MP transceivers.

Technical specifications

- RX freq coverage: 100 kHz-56 MHz, 118 MHz-164 MHz, 420 MHz-470 MHz
- TX freq coverage: 160 – 6 Meters, 2 Meters, 70 Centimeters
- Emission: CW, SSB, AM, FM, digital mode
- Power output: 100W (SSB, CW, FM), 25W (AM, carrier) @ 13.8V

Other model variants

The FT-857D is a model with digital signal processing.

== QRP transceivers ==
These are low power transceivers primarily used by Amateur radio operators for QRP (low power) operation. They are available as commercial products, built from kits or homebrewed from published plans.

Model	Type	Band or frequency range	Maximum power (W)	Modes	In production
UBitx (v6)	Kit (can also be homebrewed)	3–30 MHz (HF)	5–10	CW / SSB / wide band RX	Yes
BITX40	Kit	40m	7	SSB	No
QCX / QCX+ / QCXmini	Kit	Built for a single band 80m / 60m / 40m / 30m / 20m / 17m	5	CW	Yes
QDX	Kit	80m / 40m / 30m / 20m	5	Digital modes (WSJT-X and JS8Call, primarily)	Yes
QMX	Kit (can be ordered assembled)	80m / 60m / 40m / 30m / 20m	5	CW, Digital modes, SSB	Yes
QMX+	Kit (can be ordered assembled)	160m / 80m / 60m / 40m / 30m / 20m / 17m / 15m / 12m / 10m / 6m	5	CW, Digital modes, SSB	Yes
2N2/40+	Homebrew	40m (mods for other bands)	2	CW	N/A
Small Wonder Labs SW+	Kit	Single band 80m / 40m / 20m	2	CW	No
ME Series	Kit	Single band 80m / 40m / 30m / 20m	2	CW	Yes
Mosquita III	Kit	40m	5	CW	No
Nouveau 75A	Kit	80M	5 (Carrier) / 20 PEP	AM	Yes
Splinter II	Kit	40m	0.5	CW	Yes
OHR 100A	Kit	80m / 40m / 30m / 20m / 15m	5 (4–4.5 on 15m)	CW	Yes
BCR Blue Cool Radio	Kit	(80m) / 40m / 30m / 20m / 17m	5	CW	No
QRPGuys DSB Digital Transceiver II	Kit	40m / 30m / 20m	1 – 2.5	Digital Modes (FT8 / Others)	Yes
Xiegu G1M	Commercial	80m, 40m, 20m, 15m	5	CW / SSB / (AM: receive-only)	Yes
Xiegu 5105	Commercial	160m – 6m	4.5	SSB / AM / FM	Yes
Xiegu G90	Commercial	160m – 10m	20	CW / SSB / AM / (FM experimental with low sound quality)	Yes
Elecraft KX3	Kit or assembled	160 – 6 meter ham bands / wide band RX	0.1 – 10	CW / SSB / AM / FM / digital modes	Yes
Yaesu FT-818, Yaesu FT-817(ND)	Commercial	HF/VHF/UHF (no 4m band, no 1.25m band, 60m band varies by model)	FT-818 external power: 1–6W; FT-817 external power: 0.5–5W; FT-818/817 internal battery: max. 2.5W	CW / SSB / AM / FM / digital modes (soundcard interface required)	FT-818: Yes, FT-817: no
Icom IC-705	Commercial	HF/VHF/UHF (no 4m band, no 1.25m band)	10 (external power), 5 (internal battery)	CW / SSB / AM / FM / D-STAR / digital modes (USB soundcard built-in)	Yes

== See also ==
- List of amateur radio software
- List of communications receivers
- List of radios
