= SE 88/5 =

The SE-88/5 was a clandestine 5-Watt short-wave radio transmitter and receiver set developed around 1938 for covert military and intelligence operations.

== Overview and Design ==
- Power Output: Rated at 5 Watts.
- Configuration: Housed the transmitter (S. 88/5) and the receiver (E 88) in separate distinct metal housing boxes.

== Similar devices ==
- SE 74/12 & S 90/40: Later portable shortwave transmitter-receiver systems used by clandestine operatives and commando units.
- SE 109/3 ("Keksdose"): A late-war ultra-compact radio station housed inside a biscuit tin, utilizing low-power battery packs.

== See also ==
- Amateur radio homebrew
- List of amateur radio transceivers
- QRP operation
- Vintage amateur radio
