= Yaesu FT-One =

Amateur radio transceiver

The Yaesu FT-ONE is an all-mode (CW, SSB, AM, FSK, and FM) solid state general coverage HF amateur radio (HAM) transceiver. The use of FM required an optional FM board to be installed. The unit was designed for fixed, portable or mobile operation, although the size (380 mm x 157 mm x 350 mm) and weight (17 kg) made it more suitable for fixed use. The FT-ONE was built by the Japanese Yaesu-Musen Corporation (usually called "Yaesu") from 1982 to 1986. At its release, the FT-ONE was launched as the successor to the FT-902 and as the new Yaesu top-of-the-line transceiver. The FT-ONE was not only Yaesu's first fully synthesized, computer-controlled amateur band transceiver but it was also the first transceiver with a general coverage receiver. The FT-ONE was sold in the U.S., Asian and European markets. It was released in 1982 with a list price of $2,800 US.

== Technical description ==
The receiver is filtered by a 22 pole crystal filter with switchable extra eight- and six-pole narrow-band CW filters, a 14 pole SSB filter and a separate 14 pole CW filter. The RF circuit is based on a – manually or automatically – microprocessor-controlled PIN diode attenuator, with two bipolar power transistors used as a high level RF amplifier in the receive mode and as a double RF output pre-driver in the transmit mode. This is to ensure continuous output power on all frequencies. To guarantee a clean local oscillator signal to the Shottky diode mixer module, six separate voltage controlled oscillators (VCO's) were used. The final power transistors produce >100W through a three-stage microprocessor controlled low-pass filter.

== Accessories ==
- YM-34 through YM-38 base and hand microphones
- SP-980 external speaker
- FL-2100Z linear amplifier, 100W input – 1 kW output
- FTV-107R VHF/UHF transverter
- 5 separate crystal filters

== Pros ==
Mechanically, the FT-1 is very well-built; at the time, Yaesu claimed it to be the top-of-the-line in the amateur radio segment. The set has a nice design, looks very professional and is easy to operate. This standard HAM rig was designed with full general coverage receive. A modification to the standard programmable ROM allows continuous transmitting from 1.8 up to 30 MHz by cutting a wire jumper. The receiver is considered to be one of the best of its time, due to the outstanding crystal filters. The AM and FM modes also function quite well for a radio of this era. All components are mounted on easily accessible glass epoxy circuit boards.

== Cons ==
The set is equipped with an early design synthesizer and local oscillator design, and was prone to drift, inaccuracy, and phase noise. Yaesu introduced circuit modifications in the later production series to improve on the issue, but was not able to completely fix the problems, as the underlying concept remained unchanged.

== Technical specifications ==
- Frequency coverage: transmit: 1.8-2.0, 3.0 -4.0, 7.0-8.0, 10.0-11.0, 14.0 – 15.0, 18.0-19.0, 21.0 – 22.0, 24.0-25.0 and 28.0 – 29.99 MHz
- Frequency coverage: receive 150 kHz to 29.9999 MHz continuous
- Power requirements (AC): 100–120 V or 200-234 V AC 50–60 Hz
- Power requirements (DC): 13.8 V DC, 2.7 A on receive, 20 A on transmit
- Tuning steps: 1 MHz, 100 kHz, 100 Hz, 10 Hz switchable
- Dimensions 380 mm x 157 mm x 350 mm with all feet, knobs and heatsink
- Weight 17 kg
- Emission: CW, SSB, FSK, AM, FM (with optional FM board)
- Power output: SSB, CW 100 W (160–15 m), 90 W (10 m); AM 25 W; FM, FSK 50 W
- Carrier suppression: better than -40 dB below rated output
- Unwanted sideband suppression: better than -50 dB below peak output
- Spurious: better than – 40 dB below peak output
- Distortion: better than -31 dB below peak output
- Transmitter freq response: 350 – 2700 Hz (-6 dB)
- Stability: less than 300 Hz drift in the first half-hour after 10 mins warmup; after that, less than 100 Hz
- Ant output impedance: 50 ohms unbalanced nominal
- Microphone output impedance: 500-600 ohms nominal
- Receive sensitivity: 150 kHz – 29.999 MHz continuous better than 0.3 microV for S/N 10 dB
- Image rejection: better than -80 dB
- IF rejection: better than -70 dB (all freq)
- Selectivity: -6 dB 2.4 kHz, -60 dB 4.0 kHz
- Audio output: 3W @ 10% THD, 4 ohms
