= Yaesu FT-7(B) =

Amateur radio transceiver

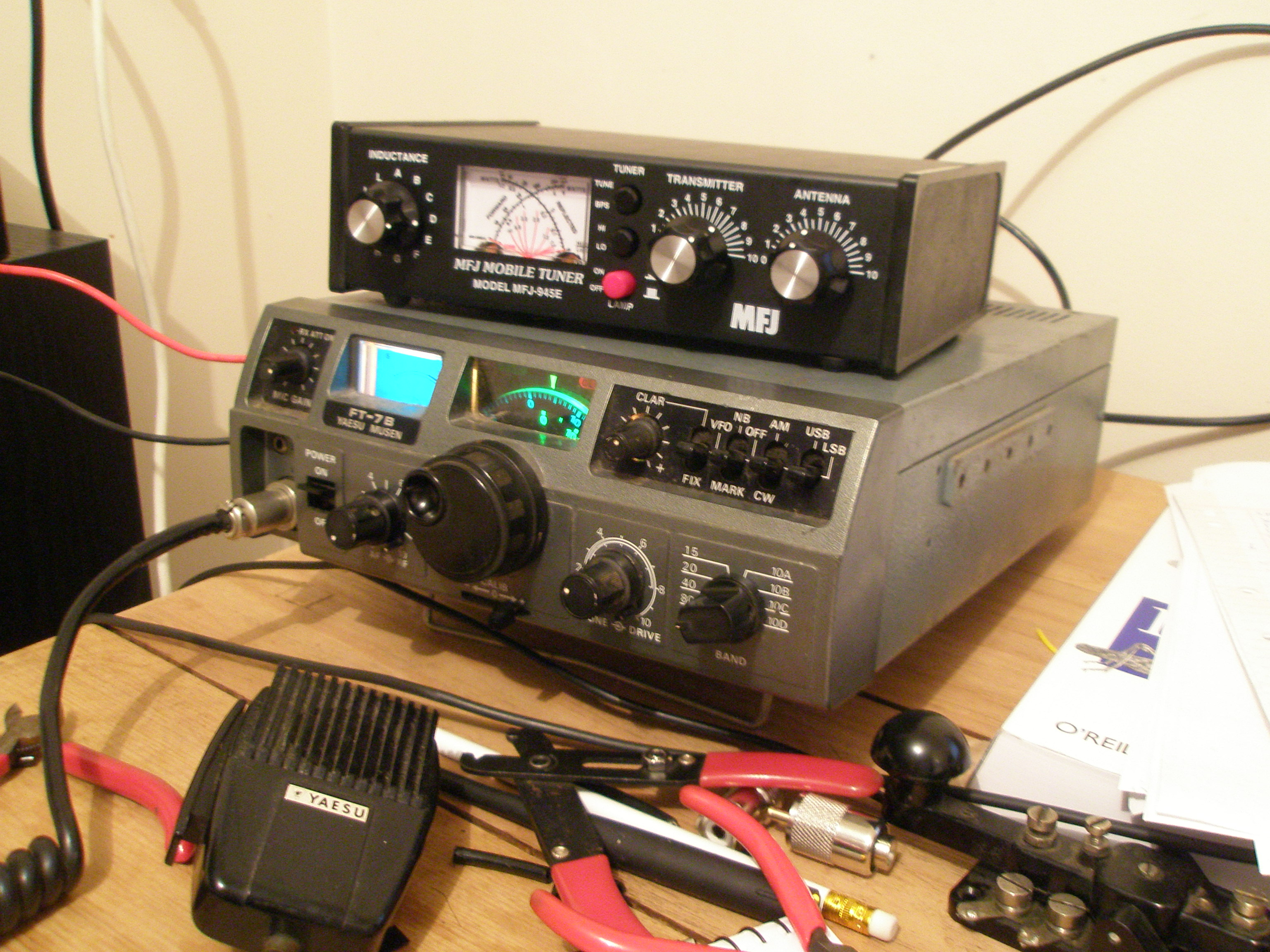
Yaesu FT-7B

Yaesu FT-7 is a rugged, solid state and modular built HF amateur-band radio transceiver, suitable for fixed and for mobile operation. The set was built by the Yaesu Corporation in Japan in the late 1970s and early 1980s. Its first Japanese release was in 1976. This transceiver was very small for its time; by current modern standards however it is a large mobile set. It is a low-power (QRP) SSB and CW transceiver of which transmitting power is adjustable up from 10 to about 20 W.

In 1979 its somewhat upgraded successor – the Yaesu FT-7B – was released and as of 1980 this rig was also sold on the European market. FT-7B has fully extended 10 m band coverage in four 500 kHz segments (this was limited to a single 500 kHz segment in the original FT-7 version). The FT-7B also offers Amplitude modulation (AM) mode. Its transmitting output is adjustable from 5 to 50 W maximum by an integrated 50 W power amplifier using two 2SC2099 final transistors. It is also equipped with a noise blanker and an RF attenuator.

In Europe the sets were imported by the Swiss firm Sommerkamp and sold as Sommerkamp FT-7(B).

== Technical description ==
Solid state receive and transmit operating in single conversion configuration with premix heterodyne techniques reducing signal distortion in transmit and receive mode. The incoming signal goes via an antenna relay, tuning circuit, to a RF amplifier, passband tuning unit and mixer. The signal is filtered and fed to the audio amplifier and translated into a 3 W audio signal. The outgoing signal is going from the microphone via the modulator / demodulator unit to a filter. Then it is amplified and heterodyned, mixed and fed to the final amplifier.

== Accessories ==
- VF-7 separate VFO (and only for FT-7)
- YC-7B digital readout frequency counter (and only for FT-7B)
- FL-110 linear amplifier 10 W in, 90 W out
- RSL/RSM mobile HF antenna combination consisting of the RSM chassis clamp and 5 antennas for the 80, 40, 20, 15 and 10m amateur bands

== FT-7 specifications ==
- Frequency coverage: 3.5 -4.0, 7.0-7.5, 14.0 – 14.5, 21.0 – 21.5 and 28.5 – 29.0 MHz
- Power supply: 13.5 V DC @ 3 A transmit; 0.4 A receive
- Dimensions: 23×8×29 cm
- Weight: 5 kg
- Emission: LSB, USB, CW power input: 30 W DC
- Carrier suppression: better than 50 dB below rated output
- Unwanted sideband suppression: better than 50 dB @ 1000 Hz
- Spurious: better than – 40 dB distortion: better than -31 dB
- Transmitter freq response: 350 – 2700 Hz (-6 dB)
- Stability: less than 300 Hz drift from cold start, less than 100 Hz drift after 30 min warmup
- Ant output impedance: 50 ohms nominal SO-239
- Microphone output impedance: 500 ohms nominal
- Receive sensitivity: 0.25 μV for S/N 10 dB
- Image rejection: better than 50 dB
- IF rejection: better than 50 dB
- Selectivity: -6 dB 2.4 kHz, -60 dB 4.0 kHz
- Audio output: 3 W @ 10% THD, 4 Ohms

== FT-7B specifications ==
- Frequency coverage: 3.5 - 4.0, 7.0 – 7.5, 14.0 -14.5, 21.0 -21.5, 28.0 – 30.0 MHz in 500 kHz segments.
- Power supply: max 13.6 V @10 A transmit; 0.6 A receive
- Dimensions: 23 × 8 × 32 cm with heatsink
- Weight: 5.5 kg
- Emission: AM, SSB, CW
- Power input: 100 W DC SSB/CW, 25 W AM
- Carrier suppression: better than 50 dB below rated output
- Unwanted sideband suppression: better than 50 dB @ 1000 Hz
- Spurious: better than -40 dB distortion: better than -31 dB
- Transmitter freq response: 350–2700 Hz (-6 dB)
- Stability: less than 300 Hz drift from cold start, less than 100 Hz drift after 30 min warmup
- Ant output impedance: 50 ohms nominal SO-239
- Microphone output impedance: 500 ohms nominal
- Receive sensitivity: 0.25 μV for S/N 10 dB
- Image rejection: better than 60 dB 80–15 m, better than 50 dB 10 m
- IF rejection: better than 50 dB
- Selectivity: 2.4 kHz (-6 dB), 4.0 kHz (-60 dB)
- CW audio peak filter: 80 Hz (-6 dB) adjustable
- Audio output: 3 W @ 10% THD, 4 Ohms
