= Yaesu FT-891 =

Amateur radio transceiver

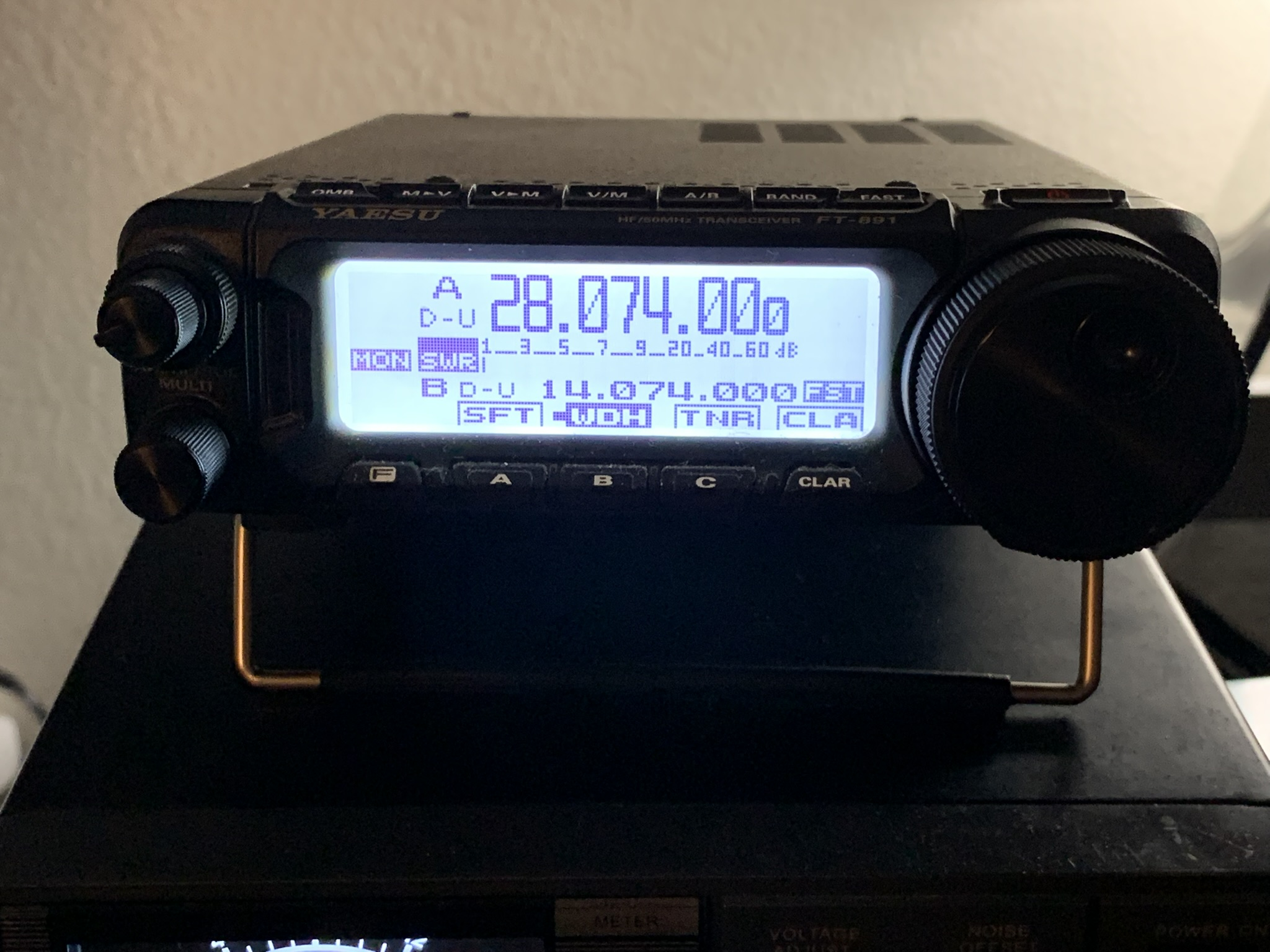
A Yaesu FT-891 radio tuned to the 10-meter band

The Yaesu FT-891 is an HF and 6 meters, all mode, mobile, amateur radio transceiver. It was first announced to the public by Yaesu at the 2016 Dayton Hamvention.

The radio has 100 watts output on CW, SSB, and FM modulations, and 25 watts of output in AM. As a mobile transceiver, the FT-891 is well suited for mobile installation in vehicles, and, weighing less than 5 pounds, it is often used for field activations such as Summits On The Air and Parks On The Air. The radio has been praised for its noise reduction and sensitive receiver.

Common criticisms of the radio include its many menus that are difficult to navigate with its small screen, the lack of VHF/UHF capabilities, and lack of an internal antenna tuner. Although the radio lacks an internal sound card, it still has input and output jacks for audio, and can be controlled over a USB cable, allowing the radio to use digital modes such as WinLink, PSK31 and FT8.

== Specifications ==
- Frequency range: Tx: 1.8 – 54 MHz (amateur bands only) Rx: 30 kHz – 56 MHz
- Modes of emission: A1A (CW), A3E (AM), J3E (LSB, USB), F3E (FM)
- Impedance: 50 ohms, unbalanced
- Supply voltage: 13.8 VDC +/- 15%, negative ground
- Current consumption: Rx: ~1.0 A Tx: 23 A
- Case size (WxHxD): 6.1” x 2.0” x 8.6” (155 x 52 x 218 mm) w/o knobs
- Weight (approx.): 4.18 lb (1.9 kg)
- Output power: 100W (adjustable 5–100 watts) SSB/CW/FM (AM: 25W – adjustable 5–25 watts)
- Circuit type: SSB/CW/AM: triple-conversion superheterodyne FM: double conversion superheterodyne
