= Yaesu FT-77 (S) =

Amateur shortwave radio transceiver

The Yaesu FT-77 is a transceiver to be used in the 3,5 – 29,9 MHz shortwave radio amateur segment. This means the coverage of the 80-40-30-20-15-17-12 and 10 meter HF bands.

Its construction is based on a metal-cased transceiver with a polymer front. In its standard configuration the rig is very basic – even without a standard mike - with marginal control features, and can handle the AM, CW, and SSB modes on the above-mentioned bands. A 25 kHz frequency marker unit, a print to operate in FM mode, and one fixed crystal operation mode are available as internal options. General frequency receiving coverage is impossible. Its frequency readout is available in digital display mode only.

Intended to offer only the most essential operating features, the FT-77 was released in 1982 by the Japanese Yaesu Musen Corporation for approximately $250, as an economic and compact rig very suitable for mobile use. The set was in production until 1986 in both FT-77 and FT-77S versions (S version was the 10W output QRP type).

== Technical description ==
Incoming rx signals are fed to one of five low-pass filters, and continue to the RF unit. Via several bandpass filters, the signal goes through an RF amplifier and mixer unit before being delivered to the IF unit and AF amplifier. The receiver front end uses Schottky barrier diodes, which results in good performance in the presence of strong signals. The lownoise premix local oscillator optimizes its receiving performance. A five-pole IF filter allows a variable IF bandwidth, and an optional filter may be put in place for demanding operators. Rx is single conversion superheterodyne functioning in AM/CW/SSB mode, and in double conversion mode when the FM print is installed.

A variable 5-100W transmitter output is generated by a combination of protected 2SC1589 (predriver), 2SD235Y (bias), 2SC2395 (driver) and 2SC2290 (final) transistors. A built-in mismatch protection of the final stage is included, and band-switched lowpass filters provide the necessary interference protection.

== Tech specs ==
- Frequency range: 80,40,30,20,17,15,12,10 m amateurbands (TX and RX)
- Operational modes: FM optional, CW, USB, LSB
- Max transmitter input: AM/FM 80W DC; SSB 240W DC
- Max transmitter output: AM/FM 50W; SSB 100W (75W on 10m)
- Carrier suppression: better than 40 dB
- Unwanted sideband suppression: better than 50 dB with 1 kHz mod
- Spurious: less than – 40 dB
- Stability: less than 300 Hz from 0-10min after startup
- Receive sensitivity: 0.3 microV/10 dB S/N SSB/CW; 0.7 microV/12 dB SINAD FM
- Selectivity @-6/-60 dB:
  - SSB, CW wide 2.4/5 kHz
  - CW narrow 600/1300 Hz
  - FM 12/24 kHz
- Image rejection: more than 70 dB
- Antenna: 50 ohm balanced
- Audio output imp: 4 – 16 ohm
- Audio output: 3W for 4 ohm @ 10% THD
- Bandwidth control: limited variable 800 Hz – 2.4 kHz (SSB)
- Power requirements: 13.5V DC neg grnd
- Current consumption: Rx – DC 1A; Tx – DC max 20A
- Dimensions: 9.5 x 24 x 30 cm with heatsink
- Weight: 6 kg
