= Yaesu FT-1000MP =

Amateur radio transceiver series

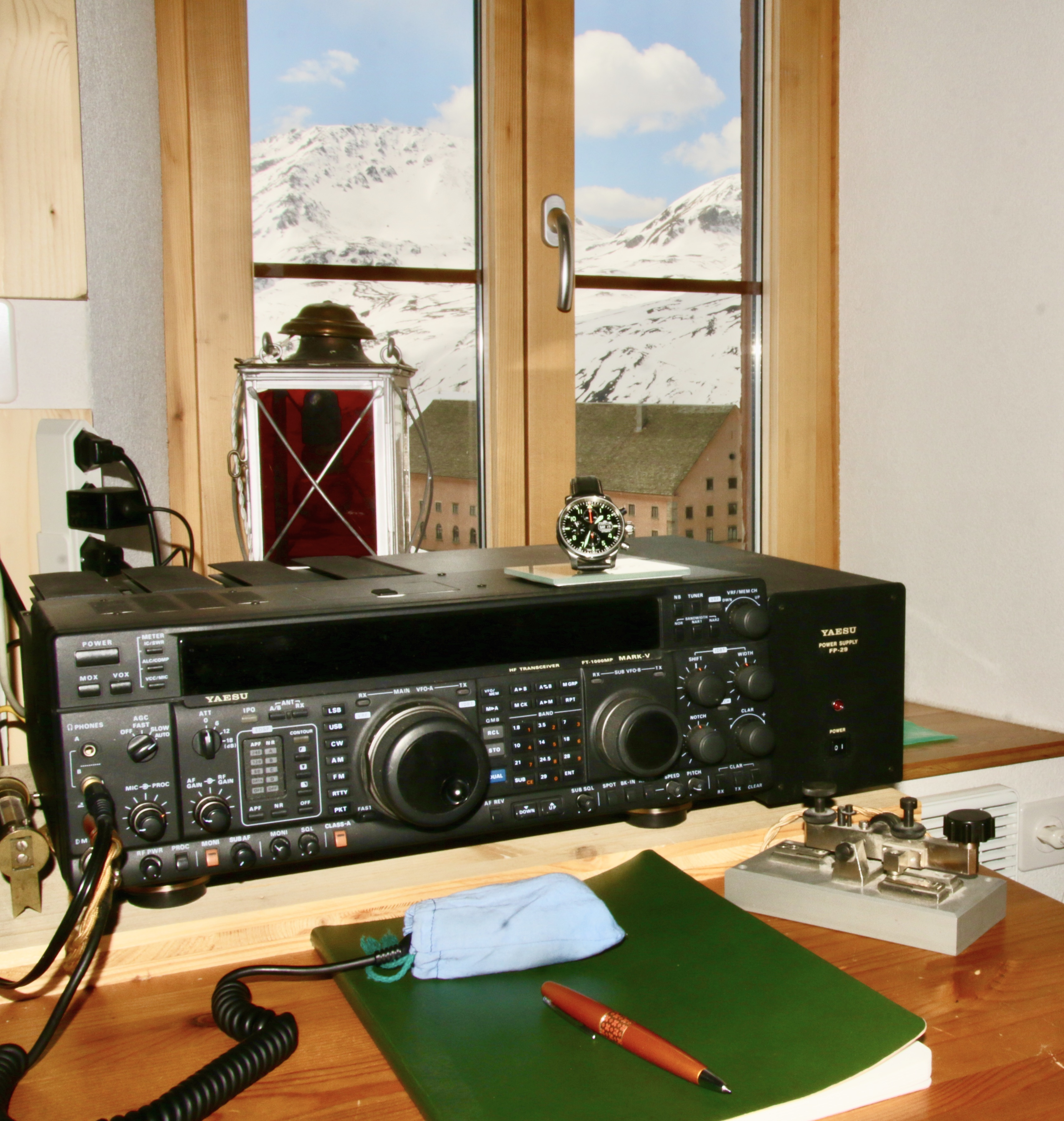
FT-1000MP MARK-V 200W transceiver

The FT-1000MP is an amateur radio ("ham") transceiver series built by Yaesu. It is an "all-mode" set, operating in the high frequency (HF) frequency range. The "MP" suffix in the name was an homage to Sako Hasegawa, the late founder of the company whose callsign was JA1MP, and who heavily influenced the design and feature set built into this radio. The FT-1000MP has a 100W transmitter, and the FT-1000MP Mark-V transmits 200W.

== Series ==
The FT-1000MP was Yaesu's flagship radio at the time of its introduction (1995), being both the most feature-rich and the most expensive radio that Yaesu had offered to the amateur radio community. It was manufactured for approximately 10 years in several models, including the original, the Mark-V, and Mark-V Field.

Its features include digital signal processing, dual receivers, up to 200 Watts of output power (in some models) and dual AC and 12VDC power (in some models). However, the DSP filtering is only in the audio stages, not the IF, which is the best place to put the filtering. Other advanced features include switchable Class 'A' to improve linearity of the output signal, FM capability and being designed to allow operators to install special filter circuits for improved operation in various modes. At the same time, the radio was designed to be simple enough that newly licensed operators would be able to rapidly become expert in its use. For instance, switching between the various operating bands is done by pressing a single push button on the front panel. Numerous frequencies can be stored in the radio's memory for rapid return to them, and selecting between the two variable-frequency oscillators allows one frequency to be kept handy while the other VFO is used to chase signals from other stations. This can be especially useful during emergency operations or in contests such as "Field Day."

The FT-1000MP series radios can be controlled by Yaesu's computer-aided transceiver system, through an optional cable, connected between the radio and a computer.

The radio itself is relatively large, even by the standards of the 1990s. However, the 5.3" x 16" (135mm x 410mm) face allows for the many controls and indicators which make this radio easy and comfortable to use. The FT-1000MP Mk V Field model has a handle installed on the right side, and feet on the left, so that it can be carried like luggage.

Prices of used units have fallen dramatically in recent years, with the introduction of higher specification units at modest prices.

== Comparing FT-1000MP and FT-1000MP Mark-V ==
Feature	FT-1000MP	FT-1000MP Mark-V
Power output	100W	200W
Final amplifier	Bipolar transistors	Philips BLF147 MOSFETs
Receiver	Dual	Dual independent
DSP implementation	Audio stage	Integrated with IDBT
Cooling system	Rear heatsink	Top heatsink with fan
Power supply	Internal 13.8V DC	External FP-29 (30V & 13.8V)
Class-A operation	No	Yes (75W output)
Automatic antenna tuner	Yes	Enhanced for 200W
