= Yaesu FT-2900R =

Amateur radio transceiver

The Yaesu FT-2900R is a VHF 2M FM mobile amateur radio transceiver. It is no longer in production, and has been replaced by the FT-2980.

== Technical description ==
- Transmit frequency range 144 MHz to 148 MHz (alternate 144 MHz to 146 MHz)
- Receive frequency range 136 MHz to 174 MHz (alternate 144 MHz to 148 MHz)
- Emission: FM
- Power output: FM 5W / 10W / 30W / 75W
- Standard repeater shift: +/- 600 kHz
- Audio output: 3W into 8 ohms @10% THD
- Antenna impedance: 50 ohms unbalanced
- Supply voltage 13.8V DC +/- 15% negative ground
- Current consumption (typical)

- Receive with audio: 0.7A
- Receive squelched: 0.3A
- Transmit at 75W: 15A
- Transmit at 30W: 9A
- Transmit at 10W: 5A
- Transmit at 5W: 4A

- Memories

- 200 "basic" channels
- 10 band edge channels
- 1 "home" channel

- CTCSS: 50 standard CTCSS tones
- DCS encoder/decoder: 104 standard DCS codes
- 6 digit LCD with dimmer
- Time out timer: 1min / 3min / 5min / 10min / off
- Automatic power off: 30min / 1h / 3h / 5h / 8h / off
- Automatic repeater shift
- Large heatsink, no fan design
- Internal temperature sensor
- Weight: 4.2 pounds

The case has two analog potentiometers for volume and squelch. It has one large rotary dial for frequency and data entry. One power button and five function buttons are also included. The MH-48 hand microphone has a DTMF keypad, as well as additional function buttons. The face of the radio does not detach for remote mounting.
