= CB radio in the United Kingdom =

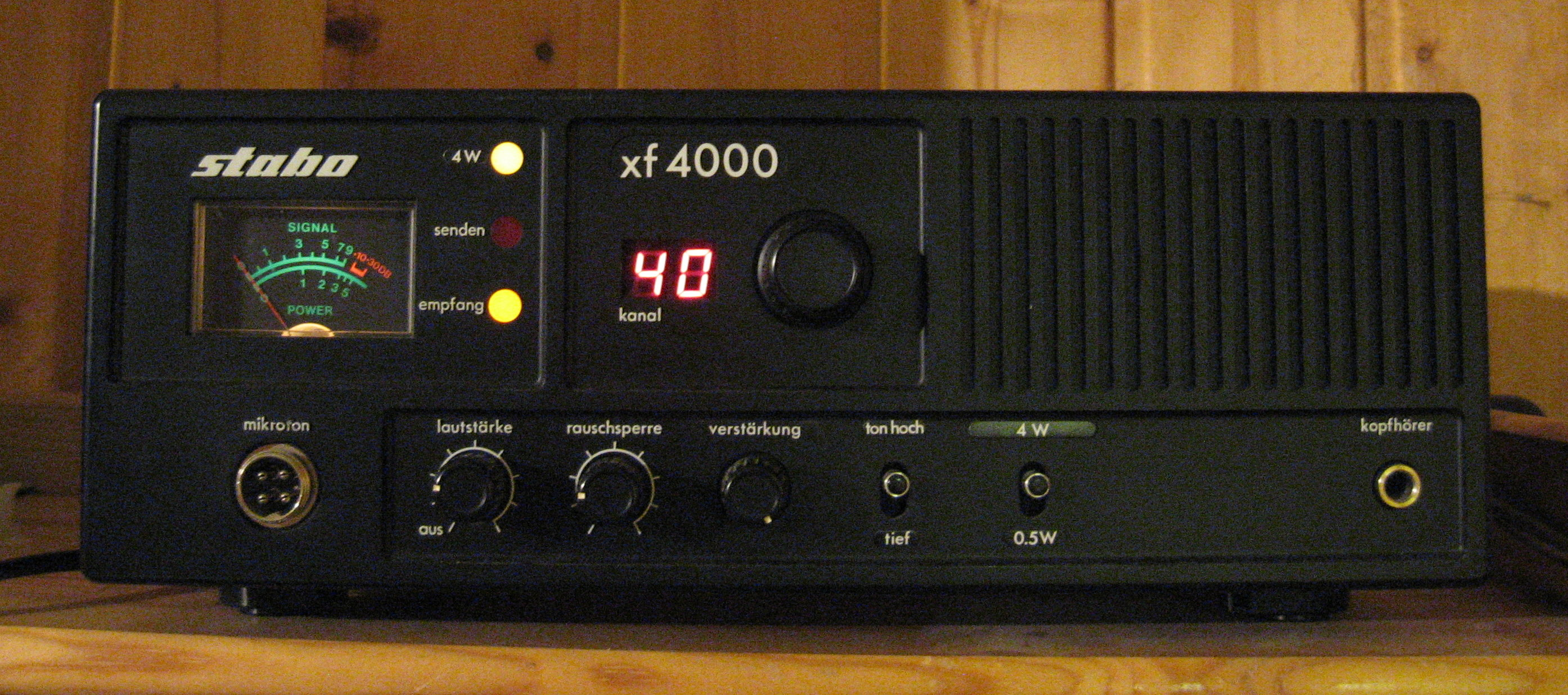

Citizens band radio (often shortened to CB radio) is a system of short-distance radio communications between individuals on a selection of 40 channels within the 27-MHz (11 m) band. In the United Kingdom, CB radio was first legally introduced in 1981, but had been used illegally for some years prior to that.

In December 2006, CB radio became licence-free or exempt of the fee. However, Ofcom still regulate CB radio under CEPT and MPT specifications. Since 27 June 2014, Ofcom has also permitted AM and single-sideband (SSB) operation on the CEPT channels alongside the original FM mode, subject to power limits (see § SSB and AM legalisation below). Although the use of CB radios in the UK has declined from its peak, it is still popular, especially with the farming community, Land Rover owners and Mini-Cab services. It is also fitted as standard to 'Street Glide' and 'Electra Glide' models of Harley Davidson touring motorcycles sold in the UK.

== History ==
CB radio was first introduced into the United Kingdom around 1968. Early use was known around the international shipping ports in the UK, particularly Liverpool, London and Southampton in 1968. As citizens band radio has been advertised in the US since before 1962, it is possible that a number of these radios were brought into the UK and used illegally. In the period 1976–1978, CB radio in Britain was much popularised by novelty hit songs and its use in the film Convoy and the usage of illegal CB radio peaked in 1980. Companies in Britain sold US equipment quite openly, and equipment was readily available in car accessory shops. During this time, a great many CB clubs emerged in the UK and they became centres of protest in the march towards legalisation, in the hope that existing equipment could be used legally.

In response to the popularity of CB Radio, the government commissioned a white paper proposing a CB service called "Open Channel" around 860 MHz.

The big problem for the UK was that the 27 MHz band was already licensed legally to radio control model aircraft users. They were paying for a licence to use the band, and interference resulted in loss of control of the aircraft. Many expensive models were written off, and the safety implications were obvious, but there was no practical way to police a separation, and the government did not rate the protection of model flying as an important issue.

The UK Government eventually legalised CB radio, and on 2 November 1981 a CB service was introduced on a frequency band and offset that is incompatible with the imported American radios. At the same time the ownership of non-UK approved 27 MHz transceivers was made illegal except for those obtained by UK radio amateurs holding a UK "A" (HF) licence, for conversion to the 28 MHz (10-metre) amateur allocation. Given that virtually all illegal CB radios were contraband, this concession required the licensed amateur to pay outstanding import duty and VAT. A licence to operate these new radios became compulsory, and this could be purchased from most Post Office counters for £10. The original licence permitted three CB Radios to be operated at one time. One person would be the licence holder and there could be two others in communications with the holder. A few years later the licence was increased to £15 p.a. and required any operator to have a licence except those sitting and using a radio in the company of a CB Radio licence. Unlike that required to qualify for a radio amateur licence, no proof of technical competence was needed. As of 8 December 2006, a licence is no longer required to own or operate a CB radio providing it complies with one of the 3 type approval conditions currently permitted by Ofcom: FM only, 4 watts power output and operating on either or both UK and CEPT (EU) 27 MHz bands only.Bands:UHF SSB HF Modulation:AM FM.

In the early stages of the run up to the final legislation, most of the pro-CB lobby wanted the government to legislate around the US standard CB system, primarily due to the large user base that already existed. The UK government made it clear from the outset that legislation for use of this equipment would be unlikely. Interference problems associated with badly calibrated amplitude modulated (AM) or Single-Side-Band (SSB) equipment were cited as the main factor, and it was made clear that if any system was legalised it would be frequency modulated (FM). The CB lobby argued that interference from AM was unlikely to occur from the use of original unmodified AM radio equipment, a view initially rejected but later accepted by the Ministry of Defence. Many active and potential users continued in their insistence on a 27 MHz system, although for a locally available Citizen's Band system, the 27 MHz concept was not universally endorsed.

The government initially proposed an FM system on a 928 MHz band with an RF input power not exceeding 500 mW. This was unacceptable to the CB lobby partly because the low power would give a short range but mainly because the cost of equipment to operate in this band would be prohibitive.

The more knowledgeable CB enthusiasts made a counter proposal to use a frequency around 220 MHz. This was immediately dismissed by the government who pointed out that it was a reserved military frequency band. It was subsequently discovered that the frequency had been unused since the Second World War. The government initially refused to relent and continued their insistence on legalising the 928 MHz band. The CB lobby continued to insist that any CB system had to use the 27 MHz band, be AM and a maximum output power of 4 watts (i.e. the US system).

Ultimately, the government hinted that they were going to give in to the CB lobby but, as it turned out, only up to a point. CB was eventually legalised on a 27 MHz band but not the band used in the US. Whereas the US used a band occupying the range 26.965 to 27.405 MHz, the UK system was to operate on 27.60125 to 27.99125 MHz. These awkward frequencies would prevent illegal US sets from being modified outside of the type approval system, though it was possible to have existing A.M. radios modified to comply with the new F.M. standard. The choice of frequency would also give the UK electronics industry a head start in the production of unique UK only radios. The system was FM as expected, but one initial surprise was that the power limit was set at 4 watts. The surprise was short lived when it was realised that antenna restrictions would limit the real radiated power to little more than a 500 mW system. A further restriction on power applied if the antenna was elevated by more than 7 metres (23 ft) from the ground. The antenna restrictions were largely ignored and, in the main, unpoliced.

The government of the day had hoped that UK-based manufacturers would be able to compete on a level playing field with foreign (notably Japanese) manufacturers for a share of the potential market. As it happened: the awkward choice of frequencies conspired against this ideal. The frequencies were such that, initially, only one manufacturer in Japan had the capability of producing the frequency synthesiser chips capable of producing the transmission frequencies and the local oscillator signals for use in receive mode. This manufacturer, not surprisingly, refused to supply any UK based manufacturer while it was attempting to keep Japanese manufacturers supplied. In the event, the UK market saturated within a few months and many Japanese manufacturers and UK importers were left with vast amounts of unwanted stock. Within a year of the introduction of CB to the UK, CB radio sets were being given away free with some purchase or other by many of the major retailers.

In addition 20 channels in the 934 MHz band were also legalised, but equipment was considerably more expensive than the well established 27 MHz sets. At first the range was limited, but as antenna restrictions were lifted and better equipment started to appear, the number of UHF CB operators grew. In 1988, it was announced that the manufacture of 934 MHz equipment would be prohibited, though the use of existing equipment would remain legal. Its use largely confined to enthusiasts and amateur radio operators, the type approval specification for this band was finally withdrawn on 1 January 1999 and it is now illegal to use this equipment in the UK.

An additional frequency band was introduced on 1 September 1987 giving a further 40 channels in the CEPT Band, (26.965 MHz to 27.405 MHz) also some antenna restrictions were lifted, over the past few years all antenna restrictions have been removed and planning constraints now restrict antenna size rather than regulatory compliance. It is not permitted to add the CEPT channels to existing 27/81 equipment, the only radios permitted to operate on this band are purpose-made 80-channel or CEPT-only sets.

== Associations and groups ==
Countless CB related clubs and groups have existed over the years, including some more notable organisations:

- NATCOLCIBAR (NATional COmmittee for the Legalisation of CItizens BAnd Radio)
- REACT UK (Radio Emergency Associate Communications Team – later changed to Radio Emergency And Citizens Teams)
- MSGB (Monitoring Services of Great Britain)
- THAMES (Traffic Help And Monitoring Emergency Service)
- REVCOM (Radio Emergency Volunteer Communications)

NATCOLCIBAR

The National Committee for the Legalisation Of Citizens' Band Radio was a pro CB lobby consisting of interested parties and (at one point) up to 60 members of Parliament.

REACT UK

REACT UK was formed in 1982, under licence from REACT INTERNATIONAL in the United States, its teams were located across the UK. It was noted for its members signing on and off monitoring on Channel 9. REACT UK also provided members equipped with mobiles and handheld to provide radio coverage for marathons, fun runs, county shows – it also obtained a Private Mobile Radio (PMR) licence so its members had a secure private radio channel.

The national committee of REACT UK was beset by scandals and arguments from about 1986, and the National Communications secretary was arrested and charged with financial irregularities with regards to receipts from PMR licences. REACT UK members decided to split following much in-fighting in the national committee, and in 1986 many became affiliated directly with REACT International. Some REACT units provided search volunteers to assist the police with searching for missing persons (something that still occurs today with ALSAR and RAYNET albeit without CB radios).

From 2007 there was only one REACT International team based in Britain, operating under the name of REACT UK Dundee. Some teams became overseas members of REACT International whilst others chose to join splinter group REVCOM (Radio Emergency Volunteer Communications).

MSGB

MSGB Although the name suggested operating in Great Britain, but it actually operated throughout the United Kingdom, incorporating the region of Northern Ireland. Also, there were members but not teams in the Channel Islands

THAMES

THAMES mainly operated in the south of England, especially around east and north London, and provided similar services to REACT.

A perceived heavy-handed attitude by the bigger branches of THAMES caused a number of smaller groups to be formed in response. In 1983 the majority of THAMES in Greater London was reformed into the Association of Independent Monitors (AIM).

REVCOM

Another group originally formed with the use of CB radio in mind are REVCOM. REVCOM was formed by a breakaway from the American controlled REACT. REACT UK was encouraging people to form area REACT teams with annual fees per member, with the cash going straight to REACT HQ in the US, with nothing hardly coming back. REVCOM no longer uses the CB service.

== Methods of transmission ==
The originally imported equipment used AM amplitude modulation (AM) and SSB single-sideband modulation modes of transmission.

The UK channels that were legalised on 2 November 1981 were on two blocks of frequencies: 40 channels on the 27 MHz band and 20 channels on the 934 MHz band, both of which used FM (frequency modulation) and both unique to the UK. Equipment conforming with the 27 MHz CB27/81 Bandplan was identified as "CB27/81". In 1987 40 additional frequencies were added, which were the same as the US allocation – but again using FM. This additional band is often referred to as the CEPT or EU band. As with the original 40 channels, this band is affected by the same atmospheric characteristics, especially towards the maxima of the 11-year sunspot cycle.

The formerly illegal SSB mode has its enthusiasts and adopted a different style of call-sign (instead of a 'handle') in the manner of radio amateurs.

CB clubs may issue call signs for their members. One scheme uses a numerical country or region prefix, two letters, and a membership number. For example, a prefix of "26" for England, club initials CT and membership number 100 would be "Twenty Six Charlie Tango One Zero Zero" when used on air, using phonetic alphabet to clarify the sound of the letters.

UK CB Radio Channels (Ofcom)
Channel	Frequency	Channel	Frequency	Channel	Frequency	Channel	Frequency
1	27.60125 MHz	11	27.70125 MHz	21	27.80125 MHz	31	27.90125 MHz
2	27.61125 MHz	12	27.71125 MHz	22	27.81125 MHz	32	27.91125 MHz
3	27.62125 MHz	13	27.72125 MHz	23	27.82125 MHz	33	27.92125 MHz
4	27.63125 MHz	14	27.73125 MHz	24	27.83125 MHz	34	27.93125 MHz
5	27.64125 MHz	15	27.74125 MHz	25	27.84125 MHz	35	27.94125 MHz
6	27.65125 MHz	16	27.75125 MHz	26	27.85125 MHz	36	27.95125 MHz
7	27.66125 MHz	17	27.76125 MHz	27	27.86125 MHz	37	27.96125 MHz
8	27.67125 MHz	18	27.77125 MHz	28	27.87125 MHz	38	27.97125 MHz
9	27.68125 MHz	19	27.78125 MHz	29	27.88125 MHz	39	27.98125 MHz
10	27.69125 MHz	20	27.79125 MHz	30	27.89125 MHz	40	27.99125 MHz

Three channels are listed in the Ofcom publication "Citizen's Band (CB) Radio Spectrum Use - Information and Operation" for specific uses within the UK:

- Channel 9: The emergency calling channel. There is no 24-hour monitoring service in the UK, but local CB users may be listening.
- Channel 14: Calling channel
- Channel 19: Mobile use

CB users may use the phonetic alphabet and ten-codes.

=== UHF CB ===
The first steps towards creating UHF CB a licence-free short range radio communications were taken in April 1997 when the European Radio Communications Committee decided on a 446 MHz frequency band to be used for the new radios. In November 1998, ERC Decision (98)25 allocated frequency band 446.0-446.1 MHz for analogue PMR446; another two decisions established licence exemption for PMR446 equipment and free circulation of the PMR446 equipment. The first country which introduced these frequencies for licence-free use was Ireland on 1 April 1998. The United Kingdom introduced PMR446 service in April 1999; since 2003, it has replaced the former short-range business radio (SRBR) service. Although not officially named as Citizens Band radio, users in the United Kingdom have considered it as low power UHF CB radio

In October 2005, ECC Decision (05)02 added unlicensed band 446.1–446.2 MHz for use by digital DMR/dPMR equipment.

In July 2015, ECC Decision (15)05 doubled the number of analogue channels to 16 by extending analogue operation onto the 446.1–446.2 MHz band previously used by digital DMR/dPMR equipment, effective January 2016; from January 2018, the number of digital channels will also be doubled by extending onto the 446.0–446.1 MHz band used by analogue FM.

== The CB craze and legalisation ==
The new system was taken up enthusiastically by all those who had held back using an illegal system, and it was one of the biggest selling gifts for Christmas in 1981. The system suffered from many nuisance users who denied the use of the recognised calling channels to other users by transmitting a blank carrier and/or music. With the fight won, albeit with a considerable compromise and particularly with the many nuisance users, interest rapidly waned, the CB clubs gradually dwindled in membership, many disappearing altogether within a year or so.

== Nuisance ==
There are some notable anti-social aspects to the hobby. It is possible to increase power output to very high levels using power amplifiers, and in some cases this can cause interference to and affect the operation of other equipment such as television and radio, and also to other CB radio users.

The band used for CB was already allocated in the UK to radio controlled models. While this was usually little more than a frustrating and expensive nuisance for boat and car modellers, it did pose a genuine danger for aircraft models, which can kill or seriously injure. As a result of the CB craze, an alternative band of 35 MHz. was offered to modellers to use, for which they would have to buy new equipment. Their old equipment could still be used if they wished to risk it, and 27 MHz remains legal for remote control to this day. Many cheap toys and household remote control equipment also use the frequency, adding to the interference and lack of reliability which is still a feature of this band.

== CB terminology ==
There is a diverse vocabulary associated with the hobby, many words and phrases having been copied from the original American service. Few of these words are used in general conversation in the UK, and they serve equally as a reminder of the hobby's American origins.

== QSL'ing ==
QSL'ing is the exchange of contact confirmation reports, adapted from Q codes used by the military and amateur radio. Amateur radio operators would often follow up contacts around the world by sending specially printed qsl cards. This was adapted by CBers and colourful cards featuring 'handles', pictures and so on appeared.

In recent years a 21st century QSL swapping service is being formed, it will be called "eQSL" sending, using email and not expensive PO Boxes

== Fall from popularity ==
From the inception of legalised CB radio, there has been much abuse of the system, with frequent complaints that CB radio was not policed properly in spite of the licence revenues.

CB channels still remained busy in many areas, despite mobile phones becoming increasingly common and feature rich. Many of the original advantages of mobile CB have been surpassed by the development of mobile internet access, satellite navigation systems, and the proliferation of other instant communication technologies such as text messaging.

The introduction of a new licence free handheld PMR 446 radio service has provided much of the features of traditional CB, in a small handheld format. This service is not directly comparable with CB, as PMR446 was intended to provide a short range service.

Changes to the UK's amateur radio licensing system mean that it is now possible for people under the age of 14, and anyone else, to gain legal access to most of the UK amateur frequency allocation after sitting an exam to demonstrate basic technical knowledge.

== Licence-free CB brings rise in popularity ==
As of 8 December 2006, CB Radio now joins PMR446, LPD433 and SRD860 under the category of licence-free personal communications.

In June 2011, the EU announced another change in technical specifications for CB use which, if implemented, would introduce a type approval for both AM and SSB operation. The introduction was originally delayed by the 2012 Olympics, and was scheduled to take effect in 2014.

== SSB and AM legalisation ==
Following most other European countries, Ofcom proposed to adopt European Communication Committee Decision (11)031 in October 2013. This would permit the use of Single-Sideband and AM operation on the CEPT CB radio band, and Ofcom proceeded with legislation to this effect on 27 June 2014.

The new AM/SSB legislation permits the use of only new and approved sets, not 'legacy' multimode sets.

== See also ==
- Citizens' band radio
