= Citizens band radio =

Land mobile radio system

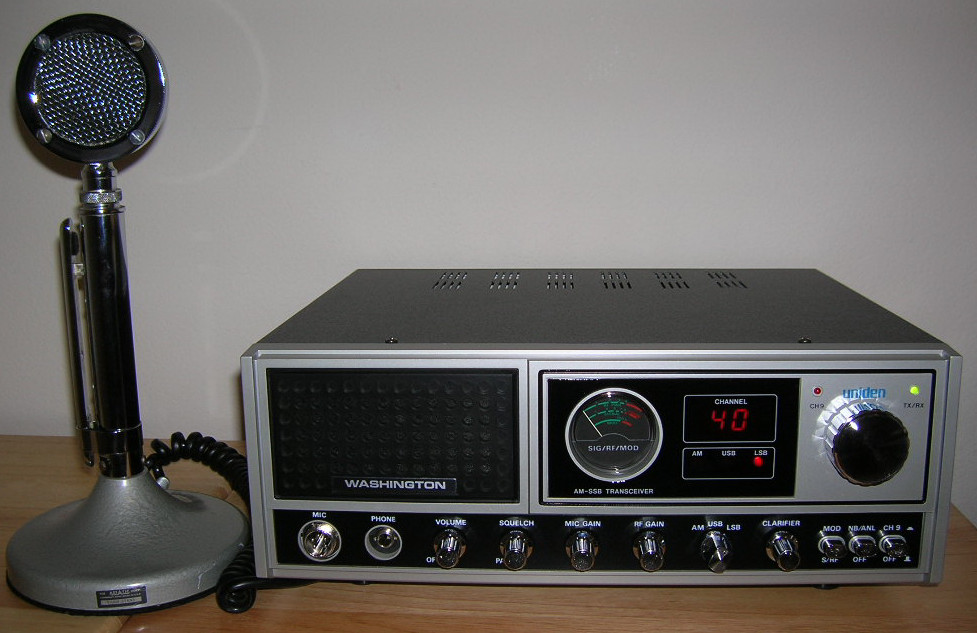
Base stations, like this typical 1980s CB radio intended for use at a fixed location and used with outdoor antenna, are usually operated on household AC power but can also be used from a vehicle's DC power system if operated in a vehicle or from an emergency battery source. Shown with Astatic brand D-104 desk mic

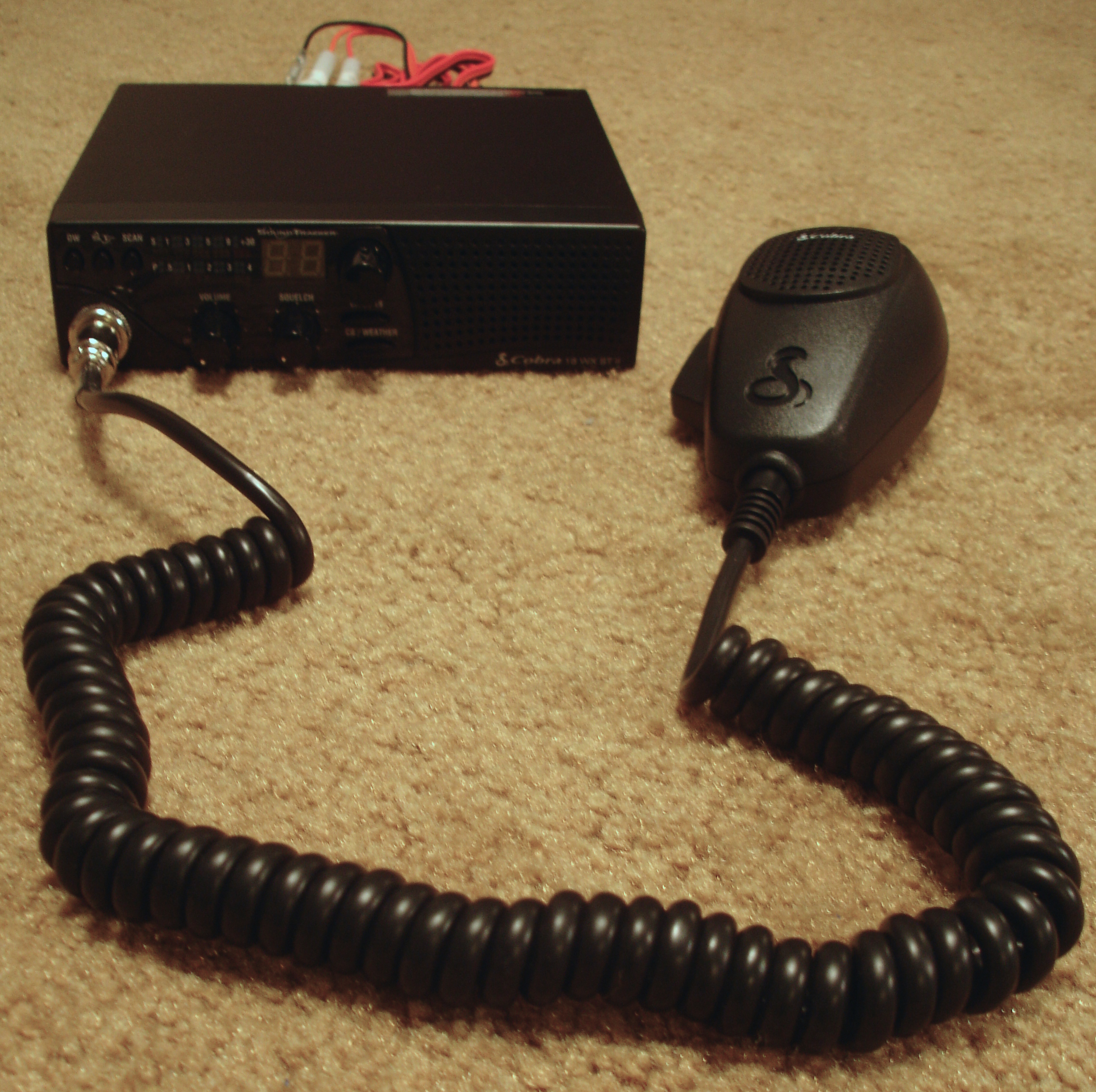
Cobra 18 WX ST II mobile CB radio with microphone

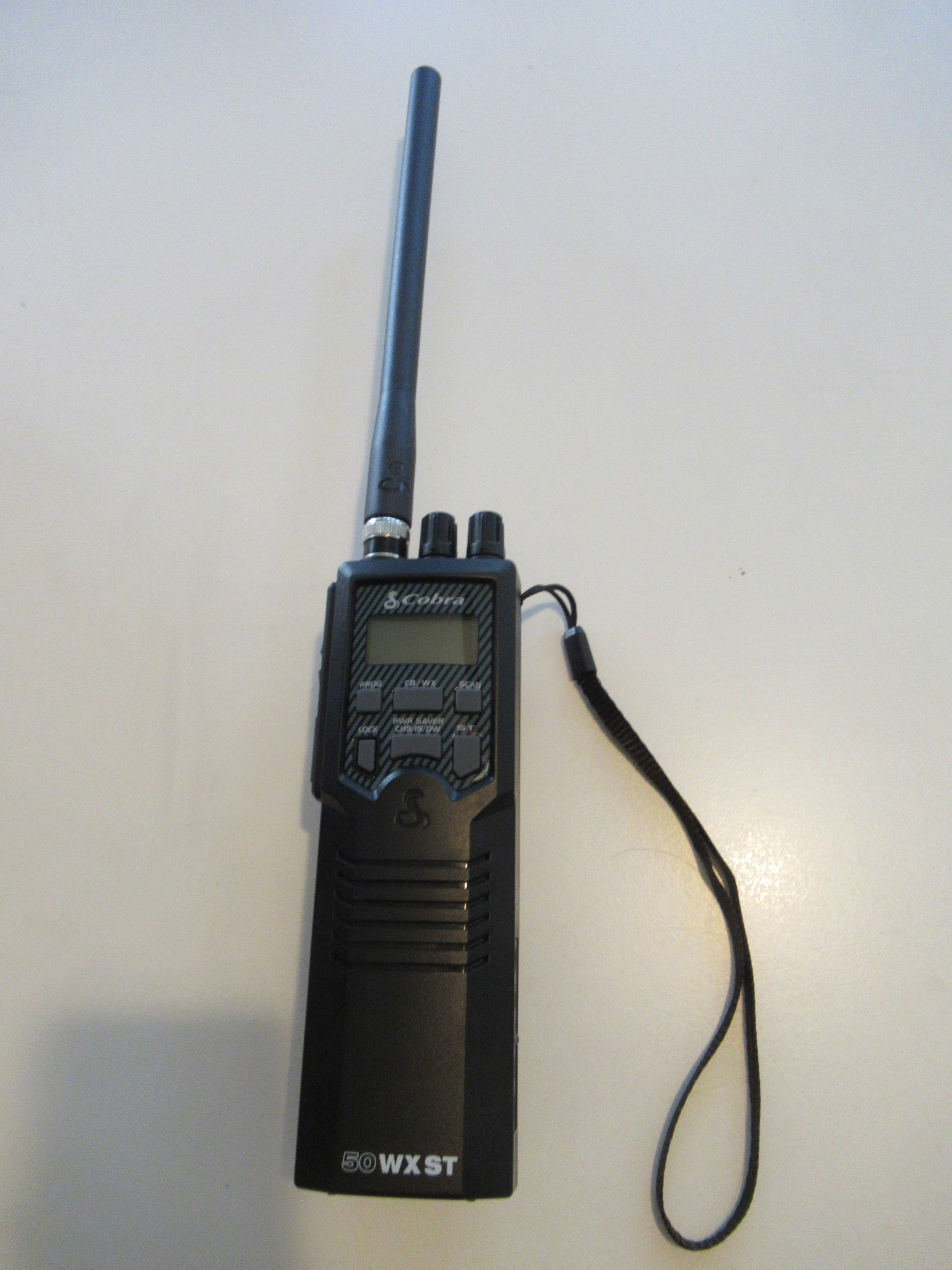
Cobra 50 WX ST Handheld CB Radio

Citizens band radio (CB radio) is a land mobile radio system, a system allowing short-distance one-to-many bidirectional voice communication among individuals, using two-way radios operating near 27 MHz (or the 11-m wavelength) in the high frequency or shortwave band. Citizens band is distinct from other personal radio service allocations such as FRS, GMRS, MURS, UHF CB and the Amateur Radio Service ("ham" radio). In many countries, CB operation does not require a license and may be used for business or personal communications.

Like many other land mobile radio services, multiple radios in a local area share a single frequency channel, but only one can transmit at a time. The radio is normally in receive mode to receive transmissions of other radios on the channel; when users want to communicate they press a "push to talk" button on their radio, which turns on their transmitter. Users on a channel must take turns transmitting. In the US and Canada, and in the EU and the UK, transmitter power is limited to 4 watts when using AM and FM and 12 W PEP when using SSB. Illegal amplifiers to increase range are common.

CB radios using an omni-directional vertical antenna typically have a range of about 5 to 30 km (3.1 to 18.6 mi) depending on terrain, for line of sight communication; however, various radio propagation conditions may intermittently allow communication over much greater distances. Base stations however may be connected to a directional Yagi–Uda antenna commonly called a Beam or a Yagi.

Multiple countries have created similar radio services, with varying technical standards and requirements for licensing. While they may be known by other names, such as the General Radio Service in Canada, they often use similar frequencies (26–28 MHz) and have similar uses, and similar technical standards. Although licenses may be required, eligibility is generally simple. Some countries also have personal radio services in the UHF band, such as the European PMR446 and the Australian UHF CB.

== History ==
=== United States ===
==== Origins ====
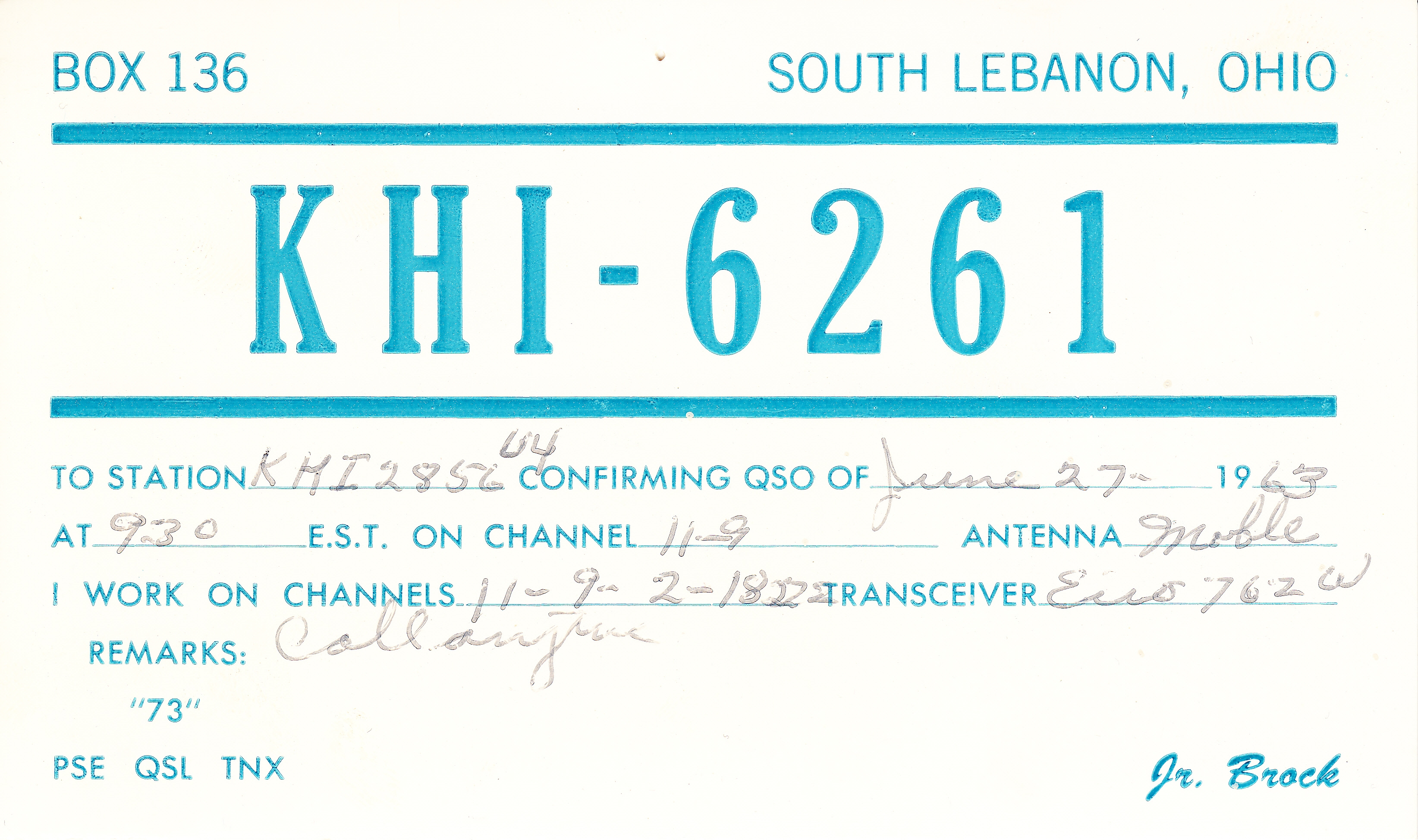
A QSL card issued by a US CB station in 1963

The citizens band radio service originated in the United States as one of several personal radio services regulated by the Federal Communications Commission (FCC). These services began in 1945 to permit citizens a radio band for personal communication (e.g., radio-controlled model airplanes and family and business communications). In 1948, the original CB radios were designed for operation on the 460–470 MHz UHF band. There were two classes of CB radio: "A" and "B". Class B radios had simpler technical requirements, and were limited to a smaller frequency range. Al Gross established the Citizens Radio Corporation during the late 1940s to manufacture class B handhelds for the general public. Originally designed for use by the public sector, the Citizens Radio Corporation sold over 100,000 units, primarily to farmers and the US Coast Guard.

Ultra-high frequency (UHF) radios, at the time, were neither practical nor affordable for the average consumer. On September 11, 1958 CB service class D was created on 27 MHz, and this band became what is commonly known today as "Citizens Band". Only 23 channels were available at the time; the first 22 were taken from the former amateur radio service 11-meter band, and channel 23 was shared with radio-controlled devices. Some hobbyists continue to use the designation "11 meters" to refer to the Citizens Band and adjoining frequencies. Part 95 of the Code of Federal Regulations regulates the class D CB service, on the 27 MHz band, since the 1970s and continuing today. Most of the 460–470 MHz band was reassigned for business and public-safety use; CB Class A is the forerunner of the General Mobile Radio Service (GMRS). CB Class B is a more distant ancestor of the Family Radio Service. The Multi-Use Radio Service is another two-way radio service in the VHF high band. An unsuccessful petition was filed in 1973 to create a CB Class E service at 220 MHz, (part of the amateur radio 1.25-meter band at the time) which was opposed by amateur radio organizations and others. There are several other classes of personal radio services for specialized purposes (such as remote control devices).

During the 1960s, the service was used by small businesses (e.g., electricians, plumbers, carpenters), truck drivers and radio hobbyists. By the late 1960s, advances in solid-state electronics allowed the weight, size, and cost of the radios to fall, giving the public access to a communications medium previously only available to specialists. CB clubs were formed; a CB slang language evolved alongside ten-code, similar to those used in emergency services.

==== 1970s popularity ====
After the 1973 oil crisis, the U.S. government imposed a nationwide 55 mph speed limit, and fuel shortages and rationing were widespread. Drivers (especially commercial truckers) used CB radios to locate service stations with better supplies of fuel, to notify other drivers of speed traps, and to organize blockades and convoys in a 1974 strike protesting the new speed limit and other trucking regulations. The radios were crucial for independent truckers; many were paid by the mile, and the 55 mph speed limit lowered their productivity.

Their use spread further into the general population in the US in the middle of the 1970s. Originally, CB radios required the use of a callsign in addition to a purchased license ($20 in the early 1970s, reduced to $4 on March 1, 1975, or $23.9 in 2025 dollars). However, when the CB craze was at its peak, many people ignored the requirement and invented their own nicknames (known as "handles"). Lax enforcement of the rules on authorized use of CB radio led to further widespread disregard of regulations (such as for antenna height, distance communications, licensing, call signs, and transmitter power). Individual licensing came to an end on April 28, 1983.

The growing popularity of CB radios in the 1970s was frequently depicted in film, television, music and books. Movies such as Smokey and the Bandit (1977), Breaker! Breaker! (1977), Handle with Care (also released as Citizens Band; 1977), and Convoy (1978), made heavy reference to the phenomenon, as did television series such as Movin' On (debuted in 1974), The Dukes of Hazzard (debuted in 1979) and the animated series CB Bears (debuted in 1977) helped cement CB radio's status as a nationwide craze in the United States over the mid- to late-1970s. In Stephen King's 1978 novel The Stand, Ralph Brentner's radio signal from Boulder, Colorado was able to be received over CB. The phenomenon also inspired several country and rock music songs in 1975 and 1976.

- C. W. McCall's novelty song "Convoy" (1975) climbed to #1 on the Billboard Hot 100 in January 1976 and to #2 on the UK singles chart during the spring of 1976. The song inspired the 1978 film of the same name directed by Sam Peckinpah. In the UK, BBC Radio One DJs Dave Lee Travis and Paul Burnett covered the song with altered lyrics, released as "Convoy GB" under the moniker Laurie Lingo & the Dipsticks. The cover peaked at #4 on the UK chart in the spring of 1976. McCall also recorded "'Round the World with the Rubber Duck", a sequel to "Convoy". It was released in the late spring of 1976 and peaked at #1 on the Billboard Bubbling Under Hot 100 chart.
- Dave Dudley's 1975 novelty country song "Me and ol' CB" peaked at #12 on the Billboard Hot Country Songs chart and at #8 on the Canadian country chart.
- "The White Knight", a novelty country music song, was written by Jay Huguely, who – recording as Cledus Maggard & The Citizen's Band – enjoyed a brief run of national popularity with the song when it became a hit in 1976, peaking at #19 on the Billboard Hot 100.
- "One Piece At A Time" by Johnny Cash peaked at #12 on the UK charts in the early summer of 1976.
- The lyrics to the Outlaws's country rock song "Breaker-Breaker" capitalize on the fad. The record peaked at #94 on the Billboard Hot 100 in the spring of 1976.
- "Teddy Bear" by country singer Red Sovine charted at #6 in the UK in the late summer of 1976.
- Country singer Rod Hart's "C.B. Savage" is a gay-themed country novelty song about truckers plagued by a mysterious effeminate CB aficionado.

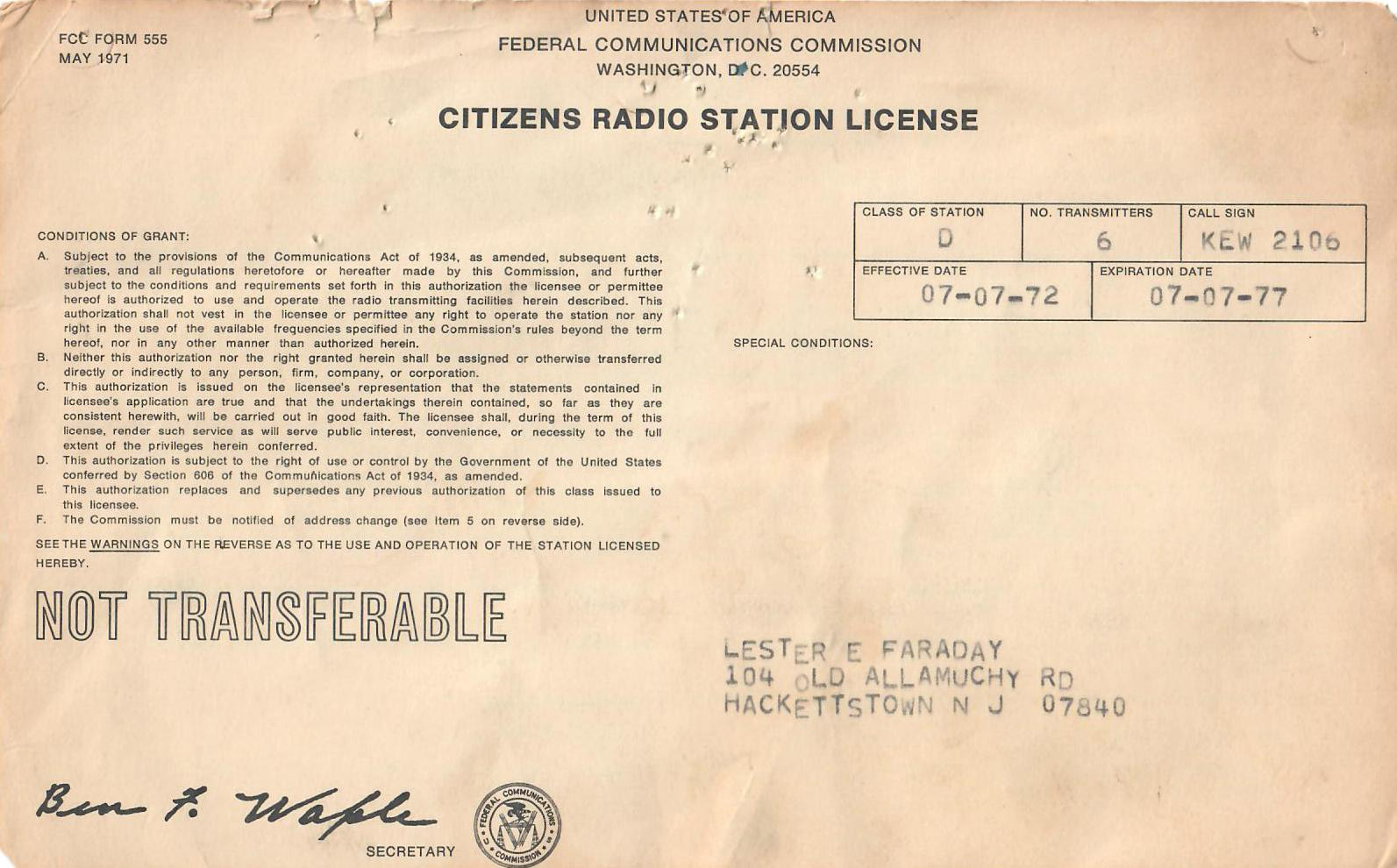
Image of Citizens Radio license 1972 issued by the United States Federal Communications Commission

Betty Ford, the First Lady of the United States, used the CB handle "First Mama".

Voice actor Mel Blanc was also an active CB operator, often using "Bugs" or "Daffy" as his handle and talking on the air in the Los Angeles area in one of his many voice characters. He appeared in an interview (with clips having fun talking to children on his home CB radio station) in the NBC Knowledge television episode about CB radio in 1978. Similar to Internet chat rooms a quarter-century later, CB allowed people to get to know one another in a quasi-anonymous manner.

Originally, the U.S. had 23 CB channels; the 40 channel band plan was implemented in 1977. Two more channels between 22 & 23, commonly referred to as 22A & 22B, were available. Several people had 22A, but few had 22B. In the early 1970s, Radio Shack sold a base station CB radio that contained a crystal for each of the 23 channels, two extra slots existed, and one could order the 22A & 22B crystals for an easy plug-in. Channel 9 was officially reserved for emergency use by the FCC in 1969. Channel 10 was originally often used for highway travel communications east of the Mississippi River, and channel 19 west of the Mississippi; channel 19 then became the preferred highway channel in most areas, as it did not have adjacent-channel interference problems with channel 9. Many CBers called channel 19 "the trucker's channel". The FCC originally restricted channel 11 for use as the calling channel.

The original FCC output power limitation for CB radios was "5 watts DC input to the final amplifier stage", which was a reference to the earlier radios equipped with tubes. With solid state radios becoming more common in the 1970s, the FCC revised this specification at the same time the authorized channels were increased to 40. The current specification is simply "4 watts output (AM) or 12 watts output (SSB)" as measured at the antenna connector on the back of the radio. The old specification was often used in false advertising by some manufacturers who would claim their CB radios had "5 watts" long after the specification had changed to 4 watts output. The older 23 channel radios built under the old specifications typically had an output of around 3.5 to 3.8 watts output when measured at the antenna connector. The FCC simply rounded up the old "5 watts DC input to the final amplifier stage" specification to the new "4 watts output as measured at the antenna connector on the back of the radio", resulting in a far simpler and easier specification.

Initially, the FCC intended for CB to be the "poor man's business-band radio", and CB regulations were structured similarly to those regulating the business band radio service. Until 1975, only channels 9–14 and 23 (Note: Channels 10–14 and 23, after channel 9 was reserved for emergency use.) could be used for "interstation" calls (to other licensees). Channels 1–8 and 15–22 were reserved for "intrastation" communications (among units with the same license). (Note: The terms "interstation" and "intrastation" appear in the FCC's Part 95 rules from that time period.) After the inter-station/intra-station rule was dropped, channel 11 was reserved as a calling frequency (for the purpose of establishing communications); however, this was withdrawn in 1977. During this early period, many CB radios had "inter-station" channels colored on their dials, while the other channels were clear or normally colored. (Note: except channel 9, which was usually colored red.) It was common for a town to adopt an inter-station channel as its "home" channel. This helped prevent overcrowding on channel 11, enabling a CBer to monitor a town's home channel to contact another CBer from that town instead of a making a general call on channel 11.

==== Boating and the U.S. Coast Guard ====
Since the price of CB was dropping and VHF Marine Band was still expensive, many boaters installed CB radios. Business caught on to this market, and introduced marine CBs containing a weather band (WX). There was much controversy over whether the Coast Guard should monitor CB radio, but for safety they did so, using Motorola base stations at their search and rescue stations. The Coast Guard stopped this practice in the late 1980s and recommends VHF Marine Band radios for boaters.

==== 21st-century use ====
CB has lost much of its original appeal due to development of mobile phones, the internet and the Family Radio Service. Changing radio propagation for long-distance communications due to the 11–year sunspot cycle is a factor at these frequencies. In addition, CB may have become a victim of its own popularity; with millions of users on a finite number of frequencies during the mid-to-late 1970s and early 1980s, channels often were noisy and communication difficult, which reduced interest among hobbyists. Business users (such as tow-truck operators, plumbers, and electricians) moved to the VHF and UHF business band frequencies. The business band requires an FCC license, and usually results in an assignment to a single frequency. The advantages of fewer users sharing a frequency, greater authorized output power, clarity of FM transmission, lack of interference by distant stations due to skip propagation, and consistent communications made the VHF (Very High Frequency) radio an attractive alternative to the overcrowded CB channels.

With these factors in play, CB radio has once again gained popularity in recent years, an uptick not seen since the '90s. Manufacturers report an increase in sales, while social media sites like YouTube show a growing popularity in CB radio content, mainly as a hobby. The technology has also given way to more compact CB radios with far more features afforded in older models.

The FCC restricts channel 9 to emergency communications and roadside assistance. Most highway travelers monitor channel 19. Truck drivers still use CB, which is an effective means of obtaining information about road construction, accidents and police speed traps.

=== Australia ===
27 MHz CB channels for use in Australia
Channel Number	Frequency (MHz)	Purpose
8	27.055	Highway Channel
9	27.065	Emergency Channel
11	27.085	AM Call Channel
16	27.155	LSB Call Local
35	27.355	LSB Call DX

List of 27 MHz Marine Radio channels for use in Australia
Channel Number	Frequency (MHz)	Purpose
88	27.88	Distress, urgency, safety and calling (primary)
86	27.86	Distress, urgency, safety and calling (secondary)
68	27.68	Commercial operations (ship–shore, ship–ship)
90	27.9	Non-commercial operations (ship–shore)
91	27.91	Non-commercial operations (ship–shore)
94	27.94	Specific events only (ship–shore, ship–ship)
96	27.96	Non-commercial operations (ship–ship)
98	27.98	Safety and rescue operations (ship–shore, ship–ship)
72	27.72	Commercial fishing operations (ship–shore, ship–ship)
82	27.82	Commercial fishing operations (ship–shore, ship–ship)

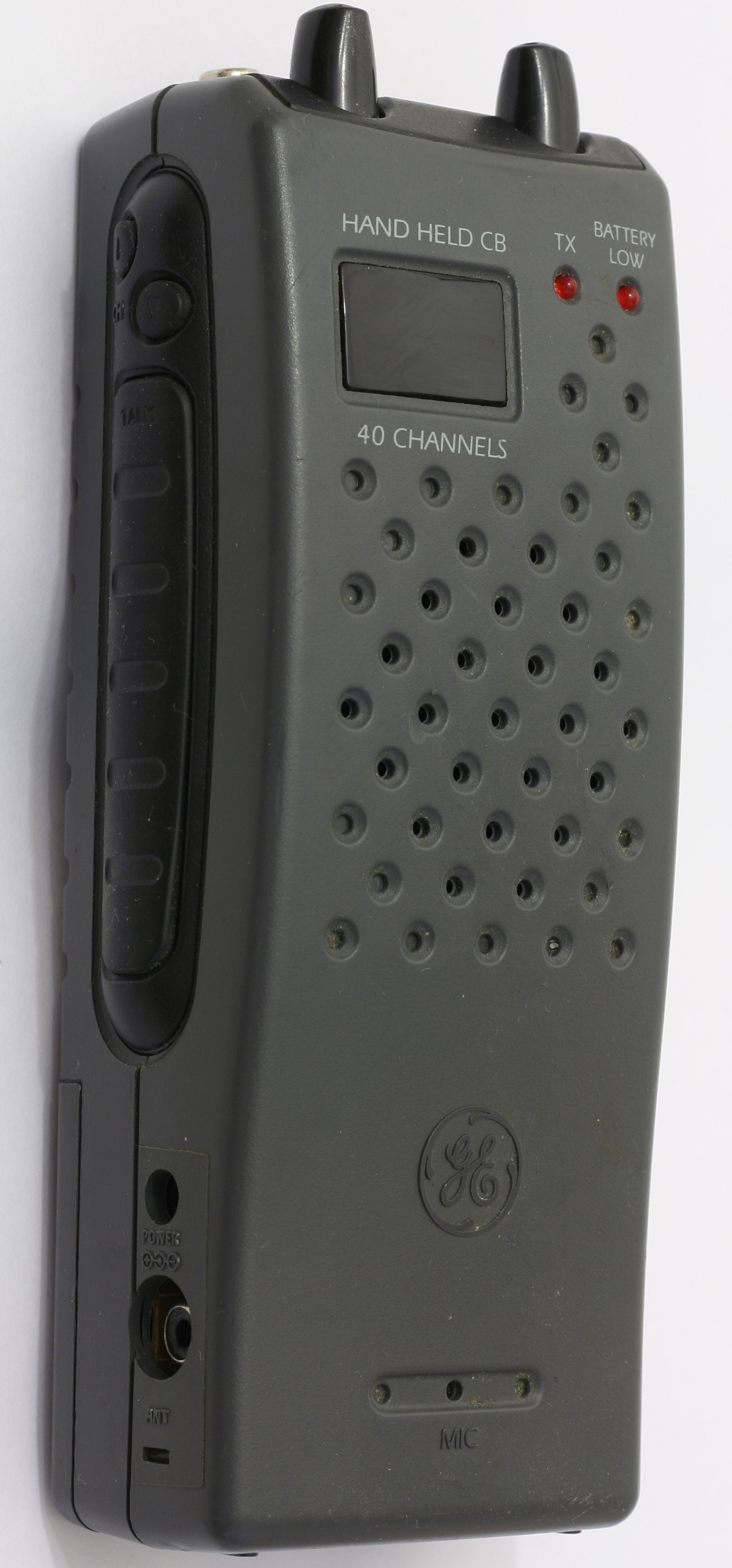
Hand-held CB transceiver; antenna not shown

Before CB was authorized in Australia, hand-held 27-MHz "walkie-talkies" were available, which used several frequencies between the present CB channels, such as 27.240 MHz. By the mid-1970s, hobbyists were experimenting with handheld radios and unauthorized 23 channel American CB radios. At that time in Australia, licensed ham operators and Emergency Services still used the 11 meter band which was not yet available for CB use. Multiple CB clubs had formed by this time, which assigned call signs to members, exchanged QSL cards, and lobbied for the legalisation of CB. In late 1977, having legalised Australian CB and allowed the import / sale of American and Japanese 23 channel sets, the Federal Government drafted new interim regulations for Australian 18 channel transceivers. The new RB249 regulations came into effect on January 1, 1978, and the last official registration date for 23 channel sets was January 31, 1978. After this date, use of unregistered 23 channel CB sets was deemed illegal and unlicensed sets were no longer eligible to be licensed. The 18 channel band plan used 16 channels of the 23 channel CB radios plus 2 extra channels at 27.095 and 27.195 MHz, to make up the 18 channels. The original channels 1, 2, 3, 4, 10, 21 and 23 were deleted from the 18 channel band plan. So channel 1 on an 18 channel was actually channel 5 on a 23 channel radio. These roughly corresponded to the present channels 5–22, except for the two unique frequencies that are known as 11A (Channel 7 on an 18 channel Australian CB) and 19A (Channel 16 on an 18 channel Australian CB) or remote control frequencies but are no longer part of the Australian 27 MHz CB band since 40 Channels were introduced. On January 1, 1982, the American 40 channel band plan was adopted.

From the outset, the government attempted to regulate CB radio with license fees and call signs, but eventually they abandoned this approach. Enthusiasts rushed for licences when the doors opened at post offices around Australia in mid-1977 and by the end of the first quarter of 1978 an estimated 200,000 licences were issued (Australia's Population in 1978 was 14.36 million). The regulations called for one licence per CB radio. The price for a licence in 1977 was AU$25 per year (In mid 1977 the Australian Dollar exchange rate was AU$0.90 to US$1.00), a not insubstantial amount for the average Australian wage-earner. Australian CB radio uses AM, USB, and LSB modes (no FM) on 27 MHz, allowed output power being 4 Watts AM and 12 Watts SSB. When UHF CB was first legalised the 27 MHz CB Band was intended to be closed to Australian CBers in 1982 and only the 477 MHz UHF band was to continue, however this did not eventuate. The first 477 MHz CB radio in 1977 was designed and made in Australia by Philips TMC and was a 40 channel CB called the FM320.

The first CB club in Australia was the Charlie Brown Touring Car Club (CBTCC), which formed in Morwell, Victoria in 1967 and consisted mainly of four-wheel drive enthusiasts. The club used the prefix "GL" (for Gippsland), since "CB" could not be used. After July 1, 1977, the club changed its name to Citizens Band Two Way Communication Club (CBTCC). Other early clubs were "LV" (Latrobe Valley) and "WB" (named after Wayne Britain). Members of these clubs are still active, and have also become amateur radio operators. Other Australian cities which became CB radio "hotspots" were Seymour, Benalla, Holbrook and Gundagai, all located on the busy Hume Highway between Melbourne and Sydney. Other regional cities such as Bendigo, Mildura, Mount Gambier and Port Augusta, developed lively, colourful CB radio communities.

With the introduction of UHF CB radios in 1977, many operators used both UHF and HF radios and formed groups to own and operate local FM repeaters. Members of the CBTCC formed what became known as Australian Citizens Radio Movement (ACRM) in the early 1970s; this organization became the voice for legalization of CB radio throughout Australia. After peaking in the 1970s and early 1980s, the use of 27 MHz CB in Australia has fallen dramatically due to the introduction of 477 MHz UHF CB (with FM and repeaters) and the proliferation of cheap, compact handheld UHF transceivers. Technology such as mobile telephones and the internet have provided people with other choices for communications. The Australian government has changed the allocation of channels available for UHF CB Radio from 40 to 80, and doubled the number of repeater channels from 8 to 16.

Several channels are allocated for maritime use in Australia. Australia also permits the use of marine VHF radio. 27 MHz radios have the advantage of not requiring a certificate of proficiency to use, however they may not be monitored by rescue organisations or larger vessels. VHF radios are recommended by state agencies, such as Marine Safety Victoria and Marine Rescue NSW.

=== Canada ===
In Canada, the CRTC officially calls the CB band the "General Radio Service," though regulations also note that this service is commonly called "CB." Canada's GRS uses the identical frequencies and modes as the United States citizens band, and no special provisions are required for either Canadians or Americans using CB gear while travelling across the border.

The General Radio Service was authorized in 1962. Initially, CB channels 1–3 remained allocated to amateur radio and channel 23 was used by paging services. American CB licensees were initially required to apply for a temporary license to operate in Canada. In April 1977, the service was expanded to the same 40 channels as the American service.

=== Indonesia ===
In Indonesia, CB radios were first introduced about 1977 when some transceivers were imported illegally from Australia, Japan and the United States. The dates are hard to confirm accurately, but early use was known around large cities such as Jakarta, Bandung, Yogyakarta, Surabaya and Medan. The Indonesian government legalized CB on 6 October 1980 with a decision by the Minister of Communications, the "Ministerial Decree on the Licensing for the Operation of Inter-Citizens Radio Communication." Because many people were already using 40 channel radios prior to legalization, the American band plan (with AM and SSB) was adopted; a VHF band was added in 1994, along with allowing use of the Australian UHF CB channel plan at 476-477 MHz On 10 November 1980, the Indonesian Directorate General of Posts and Telecommunications issued another decree establishing RAPI (Radio Antar Penduduk Indonesia) as the official citizens band radio organization in Indonesia.

=== Malaysia ===
In Malaysia, citizens band radios became legal when the "Notification of Issuance Of Class Assignments" by the Malaysian Communication and Multimedia was published on 1 April 2000. Under this class assignment, a CB radio is classified as a "Personal Radio Service device". The frequency band is HF, 26.9650 MHz to 27.4050 MHz (40 channels), power output is 4 watts for AM and FM and 12 watts PEP for SSB. Channel 9 is reserved for emergencies, and channel 11 is a calling channel. On UHF 477 MHz, citizens band PRS radio devices are allowed 5 watts power output on FM on 39 assigned channels spaced at 12.5 kHz intervals from 477.0125 to 477.4875 MHz. Channel 9 is reserved for emergencies, and channel 11 for calling. A short-range simplex radio communications service for recreational use is from 477.5250 to 477.9875 MHz FM mode with 38 channels and a power output of 500 mW. A CB radio or Personal Radio Service Device under Class Assignment does not need an individual license to operate in Malaysia if it adheres to the rules of the Warta Kerajaan Malaysia

On 1 April 2010 the MCMC released a new regulation and later on 2017. This includes a new UHF PMR 446 MHz allocation: an eight-channel analog Personal Mobile Radio 446 MHz (Analog PMR446) with frequencies from 446.00625 to 446.09375 MHz (12.5 kHz spacing) FM with 0.5 watt power output, and 16 channels for Digital Personal Mobile Radio 446 MHz (Digital PMR 446). Frequencies for Digital PMR 446 are from 446.103125 to 446.196875 MHz with 6.25 kHz channel spacing in 4FSK mode and a power output of 0.5 watt. An unofficial citizens band radio club in Malaysia is the "Malaysia Boleh Citizen Radio Group," known as "Mike Bravo" (Malaysia Boleh). Subsequently, the MCMC revoked 477 MHz personal radio service as a class assignment on 1 January 2022.

=== United Kingdom ===
In the UK, a small but growing number of people were illegally using American CB radios during the late 1970s and early 1980s. The prominence of CB radio grew in Britain partly due to the success of novelty songs like C.W. McCall's "Convoy" and Laurie Lingo & The Dipsticks' "Convoy GB" in 1976 (both of which were Top 5 hits). By 1980, CB radio was becoming a popular pastime in Britain; as late as the summer of 1981 the British government was still saying that CB would never be legalized on 27 MHz, proposing a UHF service around 860 MHz called "Open Channel" instead. However, in November 1981 (after high-profile public demonstrations) 40 frequencies unique to the UK, known as the 27/81 Bandplan using FM were allocated at 27 MHz plus 20 channels on 934 MHz (934.0125–934.9625 MHz with 50 kHz spacing). CB's inventor, Al Gross, made the ceremonial first legal British CB call from Trafalgar Square in London.

The maximum power allowable on the MPT 1320 27/81 system was 4 watts (in common with the American system), although initially radios were equipped to reduce output power by 10 dB (to 0.4 watts) if the antenna was mounted more than 7 meters (23') above ground level. The power-reduction switch is also useful in reducing TV interference. MPT 1320 also restricted antennas to a maximum length of 1.5 meters (5'), with base loading being the only type permitted for 27 MHz operation. Over the next several years antenna regulations were relaxed, with antenna length increasing to 1.65 meters (5'5") and centre- or top-loading of the main radiating element permitted. On 1 September 1987 the UK added the usual 40 frequencies (26.965–27.405 MHz) used worldwide, for a total of 80 channels at 27 MHz; antenna regulations were further relaxed, and the 934 MHz band was withdrawn in 1998.

CB radio in the UK was deregulated in December 2006 by the regulatory body Ofcom, and CB radio in the UK is now license-free. The old MPT 1320 27/81 band will continue to be available for the foreseeable future. On 27 June 2014, changes were made by Ofcom to allow the use of AM & SSB modes on CB in the UK legally for the first time. The rules regarding non-approved radios and power levels above 4 Watts on AM/FM and 12 Watts on SSB still apply, despite deregulation. Persons using illegal equipment or accessories still risk prosecution, fines or confiscation of equipment, although this is rarely enforced. AM and SSB on the freeband and amplifier use are common among enthusiasts. Packet radio is legal in the UK, although not widely used. Internet gateway stations are also beginning to appear; although illegal on 27 MHz, these units are connected to other CB stations around the world.

Although the use of CB radios in the UK is limited, they are still in use, especially with the farming community, truckers, off-roaders and mini-cab services. The widely used channel for the Young Farmers' Club is channel 11. The normal calling and truckers' channel is channel 19, although many truck organisations and groups use other channels to avoid abuse.

== Frequency allocations ==
CB radio is not a worldwide, standardized radio service. Each country decides if it wants to authorize such a radio service from its domestic frequency authorizations, and what its standards will be; however, similar radio services exist in many countries. Frequencies, power levels and modes (such as frequency modulation (FM), amplitude modulation (AM), and single-sideband modulation (SSB), often vary from country to country; use of foreign equipment may be illegal. However, many countries have adopted the American channels and their associated frequencies, which is generally in AM mode except some higher channels which are sometimes in SSB mode. In September 2021 the FCC approved the use of FM on CB radio.

=== Standard channels ===
The standard channel numbering is harmonized through the FCC (USA) and the CEPT (Europe). (Note: Channels 23 [27.235 MHz], 24 [27.245 MHz], and 25 [27.255 MHz] are not on the same radio frequencies in the CEPT standard.)

See also channel assignments for CB use in the United States.

CB Radio Channels (FCC)
Ch.	Frequency	Ch.	Frequency	Ch.	Frequency	Ch.	Frequency	Ch.	Frequency
1	26.965 MHz	9	27.065 MHz	17	27.165 MHz	*25	27.245 MHz	33	27.335 MHz
2	26.975 MHz	10	27.075 MHz	18	27.175 MHz	26	27.265 MHz	34	27.345 MHz
*3	26.985 MHz	*11	27.085 MHz	*19	27.185 MHz	27	27.275 MHz	35	27.355 MHz
4	27.005 MHz	12	27.105 MHz	20	27.205 MHz	28	27.285 MHz	36	27.365 MHz
5	27.015 MHz	13	27.115 MHz	21	27.215 MHz	29	27.295 MHz	37	27.375 MHz
6	27.025 MHz	14	27.125 MHz	22	27.225 MHz	30	27.305 MHz	38	27.385 MHz
*7	27.035 MHz	*15	27.135 MHz	*23	27.255 MHz	31	27.315 MHz	39	27.395 MHz
8	27.055 MHz	16	27.155 MHz	*24	27.235 MHz	32	27.325 MHz	40	27.405 MHz

* Channels 3, 7, 11, 15, and 19 have adjacent "hidden" channels (see below); channels 23, 24, and 25 are numbered out-of-order for their frequency allocations in the United States.

=== Intermediate channels ===
When looking at the FCC/CEPT channel list there are some channels with a spacing of 20 kHz instead of the regular 10 kHz step. These intermediate frequencies are reserved for the Radio Control Radio Service (RCRS). (Note: RCRS was formerly known as the Class C Citizens Radio Service until the 1976 changes.) The RCRS service is commonly used for remote control of model aircraft and boats. It is an unofficial practice to name these channels by their next lower standard channel number along with a suffix "A" (after). For example, channel "11A" is 27.095 MHz, spaced 10 kHz after standard channel 11 (at 27.085 MHz) is used to provide for part of European railroad's Eurobalise radio communication with trains.

Channel	Frequency	Channel	Frequency	Channel	Frequency	Channel	Frequency	Channel	Frequency
3A	26.995 MHz	7A	27.045 MHz	11A	27.095 MHz	15A	27.145 MHz	19A	27.195 MHz

=== SSB use ===
Single-sideband (SSB) operation involves the selection of either the Lower Side Band (LSB) or the Upper Side Band (USB) mode for transmit and receive. SSB radios also have the standard AM mode for communicating with standard CB radio models. With the original 23 CB channels SSB stations commonly used channel 16, to avoid interference to those using AM (SSB stations are authorized to use 12 watts, as opposed to 4 watts for AM stations) and to more easily locate other SSB stations. With the FCC authorization of 40 channels, SSB operation shifted to channels 36–40. Channel 36 (or 38 for LSB) became the unofficial SSB "calling channels" for stations seeking contacts, with the subsequent conversation moving to channels 37–40. CBers with AM-only radios are asked to not use channels 36 through 40. In return, SSB stations stay off the remaining 35 channels so they could be used by AM stations. This agreement provides interference-free operation for all operators by separating the far more powerful SSB stations from the AM stations. This solution also resolves the confusion created by the false advertising that SSB radios have 120 channels compared to only 40 for AM radios.

While an SSB radio has three possible "modes" (AM, LSB, USB) it can operate in, operation is still limited to the same 40 channels. Some manufacturers tried to sell more radios by claiming that with three different modes possible for each channel, it was the equivalent to 120 channels. Reality is far different: Attempting an SSB conversation while an AM conversation is in progress results in jammed communications for everyone. In general, each channel can only support one AM conversation and no others; if no AM conversation is in progress, two SSB conversations can share one channel without interference if one is in LSB and the other in USB mode. For a particular conversation, everyone must be tuned to the same channel and same mode in order to talk with each other. Starting in October 2021 the FCC has approved FM for CB in the US.

=== Country-specific variations ===
The European Conference of Postal and Telecommunications Administrations (CEPT) adopted the North American channel assignments, except channel 23, frequency 27.255 MHz; channel 24, frequency 27.235 MHz; and channel 25, frequency 27.245 MHz. However, legal CB equipment sold in Europe does follow the North American channel designation. Some member countries permit additional modes and frequencies; for example, Germany has 40 additional channels at 26 MHz for a total of 80. The United Kingdom has an additional 40 channels between 27.60125 and 27.99125 MHz, also making 80 channels in total. Before CEPT, most member countries used a subset of the 40 U.S. channels.

In Russia and Poland, the channels are shifted 5 kHz down; for example, channel 30 is 27.300 MHz. Many operators add a switch to change between the "zeroes" (the Russian/Polish channel assignment) and the "fives" (the international/European assignment). Most contemporary radios built for those markets can do "fives" as well as "zeroes" out of the box. Since roughly 2005–2006, Russia and Poland have adopted use of the standard US channel offset as well as the older channel plan, for two overlapping "grids" of channels.

Russia uses an alphanumeric designation for their CB channel plans, because several "grids" or "bands" of 40 channels each are used, along with both AM and FM mode. Russian CB allocations follow the CB band 26.965–27.405 MHz (designated as band C), as well as 26.515–26.955 MHz (designated as band B) and 27.415–27.855 MHz (designated as band D). Some radios refer to the "mid band" (standard CB band) as "band D" which shifts the letters up one (making 26.515–26.955 MHz "band C" and 27.415–27.855 MHz "band E".

For the convenience of users of the grid were marked by letters. Classic is considered the marking when the main range is designated letter "C". The most common description of the channel is considered to be similar to the following: (C9FM or C9EFM or C9EF or 9EF).

In it:

- the first letter («C») is indicated by a grid that contains a set of 40 channels. If the first letter is not specified, it is considered that it is («C»). For example, (C9EF, 9EF)
- hereinafter ("9") – the channel number. Sometimes less than 10 channels are designated 2 digits. For example, (C9EF, C09EF)
- behind it – an optional designation («E») for "European" or mandatory («R») for "Russian" size frequency nets. For example, (C9EF, C9F, C9RF)
- end – the used modulation («FM») or («F»), («AM») or («A»). e.g. (C9EFM, C9EF, C9EAM, C9EA)

An example of correct designations: C9EF, C9EA, C9RF, C9RA

The 25–30 MHz band (including the CB allocations and frequencies above and below the 26.5–27.860 MHz band) is heavily used for taxi cab and other mobile two-way communications systems in Russia, Ukraine and other former USSR country states.

New Zealand and Japan have unique allocations compared to any other country. New Zealand authorizes use of their New Zealand specific 40 channel 26.330–26.770 MHz frequency plan in addition to the "standard" 40 channel 26.965–27.405 MHz frequency plan for a total of 80 HF CB channels. New Zealand has adopted the Australian UHF CB System as well.

Japan's CB allocation consists of 8 voice and 2 radio control channels with a maximum power output of 500 mW. AM mode is the only mode permitted and antennas must be non-removable and less than 199 cm (78 inches) long. In Japan, the 26–28 MHz range is allocated to fishery radio services and these frequencies are heavily used for marine communications. Japan's "double side band fishery radio" or "DSB Fishery Radio Service" covers 26.760 MHz-26.944 MHz, 27.016 MHz, and 27.524-27.988 MHz. However, frequencies such as 27.005 MHz AM are widely pirated in Japan with very high power transmitters. This causes interference to the authorized low-power 1 Watt DSB (1 Watt AM) fishery radio service. Instead of 26–27 MHz, Japan has authorized several UHF FM CB-type personal radio services in the 348 MHz, 420–422 MHz and 903–904 MHz bands.

1. 26.968 MHz – Japanese CB Channel 1
2. 26.976 MHz – Japanese CB Channel 2
3. 27.040 MHz – Japanese CB Channel 3
4. 27.080 MHz – Japanese CB Channel 4
5. 27.088 MHz – Japanese CB Channel 5
6. 27.112 MHz – Japanese CB Channel 6
7. 27.120 MHz – Japanese CB Channel 7
8. 27.144 MHz – Japanese CB Channel 8 – Calling Channel
1. 27.048 MHz – Japanese Remote Control R/C Frequency
2. 27.136 MHz – Japanese Remote Control R/C Frequency
3. 27.152 MHz – Japanese Remote Control R/C Frequency

Indonesia has the usual 40 channels at 27 MHz, plus a unique 60-channel VHF allocation from 142.050 to 143.525 MHz. Unlike most other countries, CB operators in Indonesia are required to have a CB-specific license (similar to GMRS licensing in the United States, albeit it cannot be used by other immediate family members and only valid for 5 years). An alphanumeric callsign, like it's amateur radio counterpart, would then be issued.

In Brazil, CB channels were upgraded from 23 to 60 channels starting in 1979 and again in 1980 to 80 channels (from 26.965 MHz to 27.855 MHz).

CB Radio Channels (ANATEL)

Channel	Frequency	Channel	Frequency
1	26.965	41	27.415
2	26.975	42	27.425
3	26.985	43	27.435
4	27.005	44	27.455
5	27.015	45	27.465
6	27.025	46	27.475
7	27.035	47	27.485
8	27.055	48	27.505
9	27.065	49	27.515
10	27.075	50	27.525
11	27.085	51	27.535
12	27.105	52	27.555
13	27.115	53	27.565
14	27.125	54	27.575
15	27.135	55	27.585
16	27.155	56	27.605
17	27.165	57	27.615
18	27.175	58	27.625
19	27.185	59	27.635
20	27.205	60	27.655
21	27.215	61	27.665
22	27.225	62	27.675
23	27.255	63	27.705
24	27.235	64	27.685
25	27.245	65	27.695
26	27.265	66	27.715
27	27.275	67	27.725
28	27.285	68	27.735
29	27.295	69	27.745
30	27.305	70	27.755
31	27.315	71	27.765
32	27.325	72	27.775
33	27.335	73	27.785
34	27.345	74	27.795
35	27.355	75	27.805
36	27.365	76	27.815
37	27.375	77	27.825
38	27.385	78	27.835
39	27.395	79	27.845
40	27.405	80	27.855

South Africa, like New Zealand and the UK, permits the use of two HF CB bands. South Africa has a 23 channel AM / SSB 29 MHz CB allocation (called "29 Megs" or "29 MHz CB") from 29.710 to 29.985 MHz in 12.5 kHz steps. South Africa also permits use of standard CB channels 19–27 (27.185–27.275 MHz) with AM / SSB permitted. Many radios sold in South Africa feature both the 27 MHz and 29 MHz bands. A license from ICASA is no longer required to purchase or use a CB radio in South Africa.

Hungary allows use of the "low channels" for a total of 80 channels (26.515 MHz to 27.405 MHz).

Germany authorizes a similar allocation, with 40 channels from 26.965 to 27.405 MHz and another 40 channels from 26.565 to 26.955 MHz in regular 10-kHz steps.

The Czech Republic authorizes 80 channels as well (same as the German 80-channel plan). As in Germany, digital modes are allowed on certain frequencies. (Note: Channels 24 [27.235 MHz], 25 [27.245 MHz], 52 [26.675 MHz], 53 [26.685 MHz], 76 [26.915 MHz, and channel 77 [26.925 MHz]) Internet gateways and radio repeaters are allowed on channels 18 [27.175 MHz] and 23 [27.255 MHz]. Paging is permitted on channel 1 (26.965 MHz) and channel 80 (26.955 MHz) is the recommended call channel for Czech CB radio operators.

Using radios outside their intended market can be dangerous, as well as illegal, as frequencies used by Citizen's Band radios from other countries may operate on frequencies close to, or be used by, emergency services (for example, the Indonesian service around 142 MHz operates on frequencies allocated to a public safety network shared with police, fire and EMS services in Ontario, Canada).

In the Philippines, up to present time, the use of 27 MHz CB is still banned since the Marcos regime banned it in 1980s. Before it was banned, they use the same allocation as the US. A few operators still illegally utilize the 40 CB channels.

== Current use ==
CB was the only practical two‑way radio system for the individual consumer, and served several subsets of users such as truck drivers, radio hobbyists, and those in need of short‑range radio communications, such as electricians, plumbers, and carpenters, who needed to communicate between job site and main office. While some users have moved on to other radio services, CB is still a popular hobby in many countries. The 27 MHz frequencies used by CB, which require a relatively long aerial antennas and tend to propagate poorly indoors, discourage the use of handheld radios. Many users of handheld radios (families, hunters and hikers) have moved on to 49 MHz and the UHF Family Radio Service; those needing a simple radio for professional use (e.g., tradesmen) have moved on to "dot-color" Business Band radios and the VHF Multi-Use Radio Service.

CB is still commonly used by long-haul truck drivers to communicate directions, traffic problems and other relevant matters. The unofficial "travelers channel" in most of the world is channel 19; in Australia it is channel 8 (27.055 MHz) and UHF channel 40 (477.400 MHz). In Russia, it is channel 15 (in addition to traditional emergency channel 9 and truckers' channel 19), in Greece it is channel 13, in Italy it is channel 5, all AM. These frequencies may have evolved because tuned circuits (particularly antennas) work best in the middle of the band; the frequency for channel 19 (not channel 20) is the center of the 40 channel US band and other things being equal, signals will be transmitted and heard the farthest. Since less standardization exists in Europe, CB there is more associated with hobbyists than with truckers.

Legal (short‑range) use of CB radio is sometimes impeded by users of illegal high‑power transmitters, which can be heard hundreds of miles away. The other problem with short‑range CB use is propagation; during long‑range "skip" conditions local signals are inaudible due to reception of multiple distant signals.

In the United States, the number of users and law enforcement financing by the Federal Communications Commission mean that only the worst offenders are sanctioned, which makes legitimate operation on the citizens band unreliable. Most offenders are not caught for interfering with other CB users; often, their self‑modified equipment generates harmonics and spurs which cause interference to services outside the citizens band and to consumer equipment.

The maximum legal CB power output level in the U.S. is 4 watts for AM (un-modulated carrier; modulation can be four times the carrier power, or 16 watts PEP) and 12 watts for SSB, as measured at the transmitter antenna connection. However, external linear amplifiers are often used illegally.

During the 1970s, the FCC banned the sale of linear amplifiers capable of operation from 24 to 35 MHz to discourage their use on the CB band, although the use of high‑power amplifiers continued. Late in 2006, the FCC amended the regulation to exclude only 26–28 MHz to facilitate amateur 10 meter operation. Lax enforcement enables manufacturers of illegal linear amplifiers to openly advertise their products; many CB dealers include these amplifiers in their catalogs. Due to their rampant, unchecked use of linear amplifiers, American CB Radio operators are often referred to as "Alligators", by operators in other countries (suggesting American operators are "All Mouth and No Ears"). Attempts by law-abiding CB users to increase regulatory oversight have been ineffective.

== Technology ==
At the beginning of the CB radio service, transmitters and receivers used vacuum tubes; solid-state transmitters were not widely available until 1965, after the introduction of RF power-transistors. Walkie-talkie hand-held units became affordable with the use of transistors. Early receivers did not cover all the channels of the service; channels were controlled by plug-in quartz crystals, with one of several operating frequencies selected by a panel control in more expensive units. Superheterodyne receivers (using one or two conversion stages) were the norm in good-quality equipment, although low-cost toy-type units used super-regenerative receivers. With the earliest sets two quartz crystals were needed for transmitting and receiving on each channel, which was costly. By the mid-1960s "mixer" circuits made frequency-synthesized radios possible, which reduced cost and allowed full coverage of all 23 channels with a smaller number of crystals (typically 14). The next improvement came during the mid-1970s; crystal synthesis was replaced by PLL technology using ICs, enabling 40 channel sets with only one crystal (10.240 MHz). Almost all were AM-only, although there were a few single sideband sets.

Most CB radios sold in the United States have the following features:

- Automatic noise limiter or noise blanker: Reduces background noise (such as spark ignition)
- CB / WX switch: Selects weather-radio receiver
- Automatic level control (ALC): Limits the transmitter modulation level to reduce distortion
- PA: Some transceivers can drive an external speaker and act as a low-power public address system, or "bullhorn".
- RF gain: Adjusts the RF amplifier gain of the receiver; used to reduce received background noise, and to reduce "clipping" due to over-amplification of already-strong signals (for example, when the receiver is near the transmitter)
- NOR / 9 / 19: Quickly tunes preset channels for calling or emergency use
- SWR: Meter used to monitor reflected power caused by mismatched antennas and antenna cables
- Volume control

Microphone choices include:

- Dynamic microphone: Uses magnetic coil and permanent magnet
- Ceramic mic: Uses a piezoelectric element; rugged, low-cost but high-impedance
- Echo mic: Deliberately introduces distortion and echo into transmitted audio
- Electret microphone: Uses an electrostatic method to convert sound to electrical signals
- Noise-canceling microphone: Uses two elements to reduce background noise
- Power mic: An amplified microphone

== Antennas ==
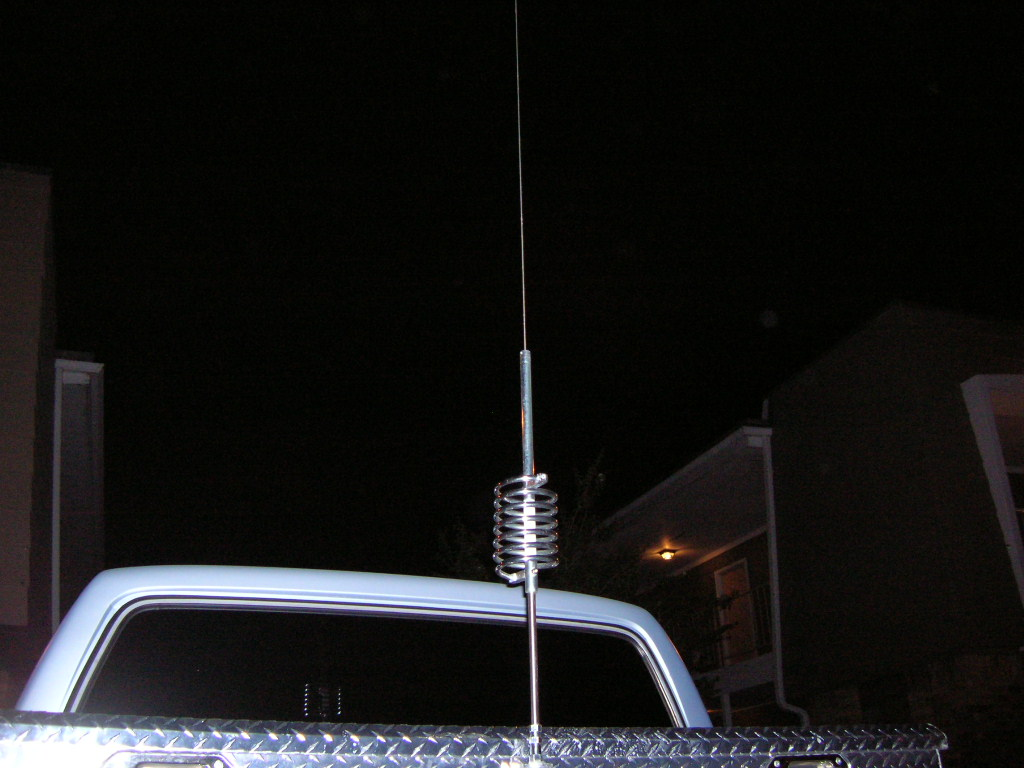
Typical center-loaded mobile CB antenna. Note the loading coil, which shortens the antenna's overall length.

27 MHz is a relatively long wavelength for mobile communications, and the choice of antenna has a considerable impact on the performance of a CB radio. A common mobile antenna is a quarter-wave vertical whip. This is roughly 9 feet (2.7 m) tall; it is mounted low on the vehicle body, and often has a spring-and-ball mount to enhance its flexibility when scraping or striking overhead objects. Where a nine-foot whip is undesirable, shorter antennas include loading coils to make the antenna impedance the same as a physically longer antenna. The loading coil may be on the bottom, middle, or top of the antenna, while some antennas are wound in a continuously loaded helix.

Many truckers use two co-phased antennas, mounted on their outside mirrors. Such an array is intended to enhance performance to the front and back, while reducing it to the sides (a desirable pattern for long-haul truckers). To achieve this effect, the antennas must be separated by about eight feet, only practical on large trucks. Two antennas may be installed for symmetrical appearance, with only one connected.

Another mobile antenna is the continuously loaded half-wave version. They do not require a ground plane to present a near-50 ohm load to the radio, and are often used on fiberglass vehicles such as snowmobiles or boats. They are also useful in base stations where circumstances preclude the use of a ground-plane antenna. Handheld CBs may use either a telescoping center-loaded whip or a continuously loaded "rubber ducky" antenna.

Base CB antennas may be vertical for omnidirectional coverage, or directional "beam" antennas may be used to direct communications to a particular region. Ground-plane kits exist as mounting bases for mobile whips, and have several wire terminals or hardwired ground radials attached. These kits are designed to have a mobile whip screwed on top (a full-length, quarter-wave steel whip is preferred) and mounted on a mast. The ground radials replace the vehicle body (which is the counterpoise for a mobile whip in a typical vehicle installation).

== Skywave ==
All frequencies in the HF spectrum (3–30 MHz) can be refracted by charged ions in the ionosphere. Refracting signals off the ionosphere is called skywave propagation, and the operator is said to be "shooting skip". CB operators have communicated across thousands of miles and sometimes around the world. Even low-power 27 MHz signals can sometimes propagate over long distances.

In times of high sunspot activity, the band can remain open to much of the world for long periods of time. During low sunspot activity it may be impossible to use skywave at all, except during periods of Sporadic-E propagation (from late spring through mid-summer). Skip contributes to noise on CB frequencies. In the United States, it is no longer illegal to engage in (or attempt to engage in) CB communications with any station more than 250 km (160 mi) from an operator's location. This restriction used to exist to keep CB as a local (line-of-sight) radio service; however, in the United States the restriction has been dropped. The legality of shooting skip is not an issue in most other countries. A recent FCC decision now allows shooting skip in the United States.

== Freebanding and export radios ==
Operation on frequencies above or below the citizens band (on the "uppers" or "lowers") is called "freebanding" or "outbanding". (Note: The term "outbanding" was introduced by Kneitel in the August 1979 issue of S9 Magazine.) While frequencies just below the CB segment (or between the CB segment and the amateur radio 10-meter band) seem quiet and under-utilized, they are allocated to other radio services (including government agencies) and unauthorized operation on them is illegal. Furthermore, illegal transmitters and amplifiers may not meet good engineering practice for harmonic distortion or "splatter", which may disrupt other communications and make the unapproved equipment obvious to regulators. Freebanding is done with modified CB or amateur equipment, foreign CB radios which may offer different channels, or with radios intended for export. Legal operation in one country may be illegal in another; for example, in the UK until June 2014 only 80 FM channels were legal.

Unlike amateur radios with continuous frequency tuning, CBs manufactured for export are channelized. Frequency selection resembles that of modified American CBs more than any foreign frequency plan. They typically have a knob and display that reads up to channel 40, but include an extra band selector that shifts all 40 channels above or below the band and a "+10 kHz" button to reach the model control "A" channels. These radios may have 6 or even 12 bands, establishing a set of quasi-CB channels on many unauthorized frequencies. The bands are typically lettered A through F, with the normal citizens band as D.

For example, a freebander with an export radio who wants to use 27.635 MHz would choose channel 19 (27.185 MHz) and then shift the radio up one band (+450 kHz). It requires arithmetic on the part of the operator to determine the actual frequency, although more expensive radios include a frequency counter or a frequency display — two different components, providing an identical result. Illegal operations may unintentionally end up on frequencies very much in use. For instance, channel 19 shifted two bands up is 28.085 MHz, which is in a Morse code / data-only part of the 10 meter ham band. Voice transmissions in a Morse code-only segment are easily detectable by authorities. Amateur Radio Service operators record, locate, and report to the FCC frequency trespassing and intrusions of their frequency allocations by pirate transmissions or illegal operators for enforcement action.

Many freeband operators use amateur radios modified to transmit out of band, which is illegal in some countries. Older amateur radios may require component changes; for instance, the 1970s Yaesu FT-101 was modified for CB by replacing a set of crystals used to tune portions of the 10 meter band, although some variants of the FT-101 were sold with the US FCC channels standard and were capable of transmitting above and below the legal 40 channels by another 10 or more channels. On some newer radios, the modification may be as simple as disconnecting a jumper wire or a diode. Many types of amateur transceivers may be found on CB and freeband, ranging from full-coverage HF transceivers to simpler 10 meter mobile radios. In the United States, the FCC bans the importation and marketing of radios it deems easily modifiable for CB; it is illegal to transmit on CB frequencies with a ham radio except in emergencies where no other method of communication is available.

A gray market trade in imported CB gear exists in many countries. In some instances, the sale or ownership of foreign-specification CB gear is not illegal but its use is. With the FCC's minimal enforcement of its CB rules, enthusiasts in the US use "export radios" or European frequency modulation (FM) CB gear to escape the crowded AM channels. American AM gear has also been exported to Europe.

"Export radios" are sold in the United States as 10 meter Amateur Radio transceivers. Marketing, import and sale of such radios is illegal if they are distributed as anything other than Amateur Radio transceivers. It is also illegal to use these radios outside of the Amateur Radio bands by anyone in the US, since they are not type-certified for other radio services and usually exceed authorized power limits. The use of these radios within the Amateur Radio Service by a licensed Amateur Radio operator within his / her license privileges is legal, as long as all FCC regulations for Amateur Radio are followed.

== Callbook ==
A callbook is a directory of radio station call signs. Originally a bound book that resembled a telephone directory, it contains the name and addresses of radio stations in a given jurisdiction (country). Modern Electrics published the first callbook in the United States in 1909. Today, the primary purpose of a callbook is to allow radio operators to send a confirmation post card, called a QSL card, to an operator with whom they have communicated via radio. Callbooks have evolved to include online databases that are accessible via the Internet to instantly obtain the address of another amateur radio operator and their QSL managers. The most well known and used on-line QSL database for the 11 meter / freebander community is QRZ11.COM, designed after its "big brother" QRZ.com for amateur radio.

== Media ==
During the 1970s and 1980s peak years of CB radio, many citizens band-themed magazines appeared on newsstands. Two magazines that dominated the time period were S9 CB Radio and CB Radio Magazine. S9’s successor was Popular Communications, which had the same editor under a different publisher beginning in 1982. It covered hobby radio as well as CB. The same publisher produced a magazine called RADIO! for RadioShack stores in the mid-1990s. In Australia, CB Action Magazine was produced monthly from mid-1977 and continuing publication through until the early 1990s. CB Action spawned several other popular publications, including a communications and scanning magazine and Amateur Radio Action magazine, produced over several decades and running to some 18 volumes.

In the early 2000s, National Communications Magazine added CB radio coverage to its coverage of scanner radios and still remains the only magazine in North America covering CB radio.

== See also ==
- Citizens Band radio in India
- List of CB slang
