= RCRS =

RCRS may refer to:

- The revised Cambridge Reference Sequence of human mitochondrial DNA
- The Radio Control Radio Service in the United States used for control of model boat, cars, and aircraft
- Russian Circuit Racing Series, a touring car competition
