= London Search and Rescue =

London Search and Rescue (Charity)

- Abbreviation: LonSAR
- Formation: 2012
- Type: Charitable incorporated organisation
- Registration no.: 1192257
- Headquarters: London
- Region served: Greater London, England
- Affiliations: Lowland Rescue
- Website: londonsar.com

London Search and Rescue (LonSAR) is a registered charity that supports the Metropolitan Police, City of London Police, and the charity Missing People, in searches for vulnerable missing persons across Greater London.

London Search and Rescue operates across a search area of approximately 700 square miles covering all 32 London boroughs and the City of London, which includes urban space, parks, woodlands, commons, waterways and open land.

== History ==
London Search and Rescue was founded by volunteers in 2012 as South East London Search and Rescue. In 2018, the organisation expanded its remit to cover all 32 London boroughs and the City of London, adopting its current name and registering as a charity (Charity No. 1157836) affiliated with Lowland Rescue, the national body representing lowland search and rescue teams across the United Kingdom. In 2024, the organisation restructured as a charitable incorporated organisation, registering under Charity No. 1192257.

== Operations ==
The organisation is run entirely by trained volunteers who operate on-call twenty-four hours a day, 365 days a year. The charity does not receive funding from government, local authorities or emergency services, relying entirely on charitable donations and grants. As of 2025, the team comprises approximately 120 volunteers.

Core operational search capabilities are built around foot search, and coordinated from purpose-built Incident Control Units equipped with satellite communications, digital mapping and GPS tracking technology. Specialist search capabilities include paddlecraft search by kayak and paddleboard, bike search using electric mountain bikes, water search including swiftwater rescue, powerboat operations, specialist medical response by FREC-qualified first responders, search dogs and drone operations with thermal imaging.

LonSAR provides operational support to the City of London Police in the annual Lord Mayor's Show in the City of London.

LonSAR volunteers joined specialist Metropolitan Police officers in searches of Clapham Common and the surrounding area following the disappearance of Sarah Everard in 2021. LonSAR was deployed in 2023 alongside Metropolitan Police officers in a large-scale search operation in Brighton following the arrest of Constance Marten and Mark Gordon.

== See also ==
- Association of Lowland Search And Rescue
- Missing People
- Missing person
