= 10-meter band =

Amateur radio frequency band

The 10-meter band is a portion of the shortwave radio spectrum internationally allocated to amateur radio and amateur satellite use on a primary basis. The band consists of frequencies stretching from 28.000 to 29.700 MHz.

== History ==
The 10-meter band was allocated on a worldwide basis by the International Radiotelegraph Conference in Washington, DC, on 4 October 1927. Its frequency allocation was then 28-30 MHz.

A 300 kHz segment, from 29.700–30.000 MHz, was removed from the amateur radio allocation in 1947 by the International Radio Conference of Atlantic City.

American Novice and Technician class licensees were granted CW and SSB segments on the 10 meter band as of 21 March 1987.

With the elimination of Morse code testing requirements for U.S. amateurs in February 2007, Technician-class licensees who have not passed a code test may operate with up to 200 W PEP using CW and SSB modes in a portion of the 10 meter band.

== Operating ==
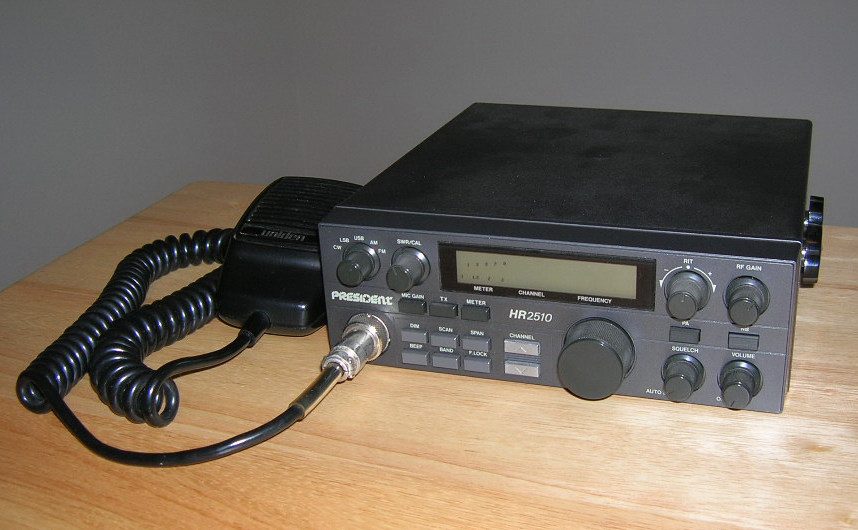
President HR2510A, a mobile 10-meter radio, with a Uniden microphone.

Being a very wide band in HF terms, many different transmission modes can be found on 10 meters. Morse code and other narrowband modes are found toward the bottom portion of the band, SSB from 28.300 MHz up, and wideband modes (AM and FM) are found near the upper part of the bottom portion of the band. Digital modes, such as PSK-31, are also allowed in the upper portion of the band, with 28.120 being a popular PSK-31 frequency.

== Propagation characteristics ==
Due to its unique spot in the spectrum, 10 meters can occasionally be challenging to work. At peak times of the solar cycle when many sunspots appear on the Sun's surface, 10 meters can be alive with extremely long-distance signals, refracting from the F2 layer in the ionosphere. Generally speaking, the most effective and efficient propagation of 10-meter radio waves takes place during local daylight hours. During periods of increased sunspot activity, band openings may begin well before sunrise and continue into the night.

Long-distance opportunities via F2 seem to follow the sun across the globe. In North America, for instance, F2 might bring Europe and western Asia in the morning, the Americas during midday, and the Pacific and East Asia in late afternoon and early evening.

Even in times of solar minimum, when propagation on 10 meters via F2 is practically nonexistent, the band still has some long distance possibilities. Sporadic E propagation can bring in signals from a hundred to a few thousand miles away. Sporadic E on 10 meters is mainly a seasonal event, with late spring and early summer being prime time for the mode. A shorter, less-intense period occurs during mid-winter, often around the holiday season. Other, off-peak openings may be seen almost anytime. Even during solar minimum, F2 openings often occur on transequatorial paths, for example between Europe and Southern Africa or between Pacific North America and the Eastern Pacific islands.

In tropical latitudes 10 meters is open throughout the sunspot cycle, although propagation is often confined to other areas lying along the equator. For example, a good path from West Africa to the Caribbean exists on 10 meters even at solar minimum.

== 10-meter sub-bands ==
Although 10 meters has a worldwide amateur radio allocation, in some countries the use of portions of 10 meters is allocated by the government by license class, by signal mode or signal bandwidth. Beyond these regulations there is also a general voluntary band plan adhered to by amateurs throughout the world.

=== Worldwide frequency allocations ===
Worldwide 10 meter frequency allocations are specified by the ITU. The International Telecommunication Union recommends allowing amateur radio operations in the frequency range from 28.000–29.700 MHz, subject to member nations' individual regulation of radio.

=== IARU Region 1 ===
10 meters IARU Region 1
| 28.000–28.070 | 28.070–28.190 | 28.190–28.225 | 28.225–29.510 | 29.510–29.520 | 29.520–29.700 |

=== IARU Region 2 ===
10 meters IARU Region 2
| 28.000–28.070 | 28.070–28.190 | 28.190–28.300 | 28.300–29.510 | 29.510–29.520 | 29.520–29.700 |

=== IARU Region 3 ===
10 meters IARU Region 3
| 28.000-28.050 | 28.050-28.150 | 28.150-28.190 | 28.190-28.200 | 28.200-28.300 | 28.300-29.700 |

=== United States ===
10 meters U.S. Novice, Technician license
| 28.000–28.300 | 28.300–28.500 | 28.500–29.700 |
10 meters General, Advanced, Extra license
| 28.000–28.300 | 28.300–29.700 | |

=== Canadian 10-meter band plan ===
Canada is part of region 2 and as such is subject to the IARU band plan. Radio Amateurs of Canada offers the bandplan below as a recommendation for use by radio amateurs in that country but it does not have the force of law and should only be considered a suggestion or guideline.

10 meters Canadian license classes Basic(+), Advanced
| 28.000–28.070 | 28.070–28.1895 | B c n | 28.2005–28.300 | 28.300–28.320 | 28.320–28.680 | 28.680–28.683 | 28.683–29.300 | 29.300–29.510 | G B | 29.520–29.690 |

| B c n | = Beacons, 28.1895–28.2005 MHz |
| G B | = Guard band, 29.510–29.520 MHz, no transmissions |

=== Japan ===
Refer to the following URL. https://www.jarl.org/English/6_Band_Plan/JARL%20Band%20Plan20230925(E).pdf

=== Key ===
| = FM, digital voice |
| = CW, phone, beacons |
| = CW only |
| = |
| = CW, RTTY and data (US: < 1 kHz bandwidth) |
| = CW, narrowband digital (<= 500 Hz), phone |
| = CW, narrowband digital (<= 500 Hz) |
| = CW, narrowband digital (<= 500 Hz), wideband digital |
| = Beacons |
| = phone only |
| = CW, phone |
| = CW, beacons |
| = TV only |
| = CW, phone, SSTV, fax |
| = CW, phone and image |
| = Satellite |
| = Guard band – no transmissions allowed |

=== Novice sub-bands ===
Named for the segment of 10 meters granted for use to American Novice Class Amateur Radio license holders. The Novice sub-bands consist of two frequency ranges; one for CW and Data operation, and the other for SSB phone operation.

==== Novice/Technician phone ====
The most active part of the 10 meter band is probably 28.300–28.500 MHz. Worldwide, operation in this band segment is almost exclusively SSB.

=== Beacons ===
Because the propagation on 10 meters can vary drastically throughout the day, propagation beacons are very important to gauge the current conditions of the band. With some differences in each ITU Region and also from country to country, the beacon sub-bands fall between 28.100–28.300 MHz. ITU Region 1 is generally 28.190-28.225 MHz and ITU Region 2 is generally 28.200–28.300 MHz.

A list of 10 meter propagation beacons is available.

=== AM sub-band ===
From 29.000 to 29.200 MHz. Formerly-common practice was to use the band in 10 kHz steps: e.g. 29.010, 29.020, 29.030,... etc. This has not been the case since the 1970s, which saw an influx of surplus 23-channel CB equipment modified for use on the 10-meter amateur band. The surplus equipment would land in 10 kHz steps on the 5 kHz step such as: 29.015, 29.025, 29.035, etc. Users of the surplus equipment also inherited those radios' odd channel spacing, which on CB skipped channels that were not used there, because they were set aside for remote control operations.

=== Satellite sub-band ===
From 29.300 to 29.510 MHz the satellite sub band allows amateur radio operators to communicate with orbiting OSCARs.

==== Satellite operation ====
Many amateur radio satellites have either an uplink or a downlink in the 29 MHz range. Information about particular satellites and operational modes is available from AMSAT.

As of the current writing, only AO-7's 10 m downlink is active.

=== FM sub-band ===
From 29.000 MHz to 29.700, The FM sub-band is usually channelized into repeater and simplex frequencies. The channels are commonly grouped into repeater inputs, simplex, and repeater output frequencies.

Repeater input frequencies: 29.510, 29.520, 29.530, 29.540, 29.550, 29.560, 29.570, 29.580 and 29.590 MHz.

Simplex channel, worldwide calling FM: 29.600 MHz

Secondary simplex is 29.500 Japan and others use 29.00 to 29.40 FM simplex. 10kHz steps from 29.0 to 29.1 and 20kHz steps 29.2 to 29.40 with 29.30 a national simplex channel in Japan.

Repeater output frequencies: 29.610, 29.620, 29.630, 29.640, 29.650, 29.660, 29.670, 29.680 and 29.690 MHz.

==== Repeater operation ====
Common practice for 10-meter repeaters is to use a 100 kHz negative offset for repeater operation. Due to the very few available repeater channels, "odd-splits" (offsets differing from 100 kHz) and non-standard frequencies are rare and uncommon. Since 10 meters can frequently open up to propagate globally, most 10-meter repeaters use a CTCSS sub-audible access tone. 16 kHz-wide signals with 5 kHz deviation is normal in this band. 8 kHz-wide signals with 2.5 kHz deviation can also be found. 2.5kHz deviation is mandated by FCC rules below 29.0 MHz.

=== FM simplex channels ===
29.300 MHz is a common frequency to find JA hams on. British hams commonly use the 29.400 to 29.500 MHz band for FM as well with 29.400, 29.450, and 29.500 MHz being common. USA hams can be found on FM anywhere above 29.000 MHz, commonly on the above frequencies talking to overseas hams. 29.200 to 29.300 MHz is set aside in some area band plans for FM simplex use.

== Organizations and enthusiasts ==
- Ten-Ten International
- The Breeze Shooters Amateur Radio Club

Due to its unique nature, 10 meters has a large following of hobbyists who spend most of their time on this frequency band. The major group of enthusiasts is Ten-Ten which has been organized since the 1960s.

Analog frequency modulation (FM) radio relay stations (repeaters) are used by radio operators to contact each other around the world, while relaying through an intermediate relay site.

| Range | Band | ITU Region 1 | ITU Region 2 | ITU Region 3 |
|---|---|---|---|---|
| LF | 2200 m | 135.7–137.8 kHz | | |
| MF | 630 m | 472–479 kHz | | |
| MF | 160 m | 1.810–1.850 MHz | 1.800–2.000 MHz | |
| HF | 80 / 75 m | 3.500–3.800 MHz | 3.500–4.000 MHz | 3.500–3.900 MHz |
| HF | 60 m | 5.3515–5.3665 MHz | | |
| HF | 40 m | 7.000–7.200 MHz | 7.000–7.300 MHz | 7.000–7.200 MHz |
| HF | 30 m^{[t2]} | 10.100–10.150 MHz | | |
| HF | 20 m | 14.000–14.350 MHz | | |
| HF | 17 m^{[t2]} | 18.068–18.168 MHz | | |
| HF | 15 m | 21.000–21.450 MHz | | |
| HF | 12 m^{[t2]} | 24.890–24.990 MHz | | |
| HF | 10 m | 28.000–29.700 MHz | | |
| VHF | 8 m^{[t3]} | 40.000–40.700 MHz | —N/a | |
| VHF | 6 m | 50.000–52.000 MHz (50.000–54.000 MHz)^{[t4]} | 50.000–54.000 MHz | |
| VHF | 5 m^{[t3]} | 58.000–60.100 MHz | —N/a | |
| VHF | 4 m^{[t3]} | 70.000–70.500 MHz | —N/a | |
| VHF | 2 m | 144.000–146.000 MHz | 144.000–148.000 MHz | |
| VHF | 1.25 m | —N/a | 220.000–225.000 MHz | —N/a |
| UHF | 70 cm | 430.000–440.000 MHz | 430.000–440.000 MHz (420.000–450.000 MHz)^{[t4]} | |
| UHF | 33 cm | —N/a | 902.000–928.000 MHz | —N/a |
| UHF | 23 cm | 1.240–1.300 GHz | | |
| UHF | 13 cm | 2.300–2.450 GHz | | |
| SHF | 9 cm | 3.400–3.475 GHz^{[t4]} | 3.300–3.500 GHz | |
| SHF | 5 cm | 5.650–5.850 GHz | 5.650–5.925 GHz | 5.650–5.850 GHz |
| SHF | 3 cm | 10.000–10.500 GHz | | |
| SHF | 1.2 cm | 24.000–24.250 GHz | | |
| EHF | 6 mm | 47.000–47.200 GHz | | |
| EHF | 4 mm^{[t4]} | 75.500 GHz^{[t3]} – 81.500 GHz | 76.000–81.500 GHz | |
| EHF | 2.5 mm | 122.250–123.000 GHz | | |
| EHF | 2 mm | 134.000–141.000 GHz | | |
| EHF | 1 mm | 241.000–250.000 GHz | | |
| THF | Sub-mm | Some administrations have authorized spectrum for amateur use in this region; others have declined to regulate frequencies above 300 GHz. | | |
| [t1] | All allocations are subject to variation by country. For simplicity, only common allocations found internationally are listed. See a band's article for specifics. | | | |
| [t2] | HF allocation created at the 1979 World Administrative Radio Conference. These are commonly called the "WARC bands". | | | |
| [t3] | This is not mentioned in the ITU's Table of Frequency Allocations, but many individual administrations have commonly adopted this allocation under "Article 4.4". | | | |
| [t4] | This includes a currently active footnote allocation mentioned in the ITU's Table of Frequency Allocations. These allocations may only apply to a group of countries. | | | |
See also: Radio spectrum, Electromagnetic spectrum
