= CB radio in the United States =

In the United States, the Citizens Band Radio Service (CBRS), commonly called citizens band radio (CB radio), is one of several personal radio services defined under Title 47 of the Code of Federal Regulations, Part 95. It is intended to be a two-way voice communication service for use in personal and business activities of the general public, and has a reliable communications range of several miles, though the range is highly dependent on type of radio, antenna and propagation.

CB radio is most frequently used by long-haul truck drivers for everything from relaying information regarding road conditions, the location of speed traps and other travel information, to basic socializing and friendly chatter. CB radio is also frequently used on larger farms for communication between machinery operators.

== Origins ==
As originally constituted, what is now CB radio was Class D of the Citizens' Radio Service. Classes A and B were in the UHF radio band and served a similar purpose as Class D while Class C was interspersed among the current CB channels and used for remote control of devices, usually model craft (aircraft, watercraft, or road vehicles). Class A and B were eventually replaced by the FM Family Radio Service (FRS) and FM General Mobile Radio Service (GMRS). What was initially Class C, is now known as the Radio Control Radio Service and now includes spectrum at 72 and 76 MHz in addition to the original 27 MHz AM channels interspersed among voice channels as well as CB channel 23.

== Eligibility ==
There are no age, citizenship, or license requirements to operate a CB radio in the United States, and the service falls under the "License by Rule" part of the FCC rules (basically, if one follows the rules one is considered licensed). Operators may use any of the authorized 40 CB channels; however, channel 9 is used only for emergency communications or for traveler assistance. The higher number channels are almost exclusively single-sideband (SSB) modulation. Use of all channels is on a shared basis. However, foreign governments and their representatives are not eligible to use citizens' band radio within the United States.

Operation is permitted anywhere within the United States and its territories or possessions; as well as anywhere in the world except within the territorial limits of areas where radio services are regulated by a foreign government, or another US agency such as the Department of Defense.

Transmitters must be FCC certified and may not be modified, including modifications to increase output power or to transmit on unauthorized frequencies. Output power is limited to 4 watts for AM and FM transmitters and 12 watts peak envelope power for SSB transmitters. The antenna may not be more than 20 feet (6.1 m) above the highest point of the structure it is mounted to, or the highest point of the antenna must not be more than 60 feet (18.3 m) above the ground (47 CFR 95.408(c)) if installed in a fixed location.

CB radios must include AM or SSB modulation and may include frequency modulation. If a radio includes SSB, it must transmit on the upper sideband with a suppressed, reduced, or full carrier. The unit may also transmit on the lower sideband with carrier as noted.

== Channel assignments ==
=== Allocated frequencies ===
CB channels
Channel	Frequency (MHz)	Typical use (US)
1	26.965	
2	26.975	
3	26.985	
4	27.005	Off-roading
5	27.015	
6	27.025	Considered the "Super Bowl" channel, although unrelated to the NFL Super Bowl
7	27.035	
8	27.055	
9	27.065	Emergencies only. 47 CFR 95.931(a)(2):"CBRS Channel 9 may be used only for emergency communications or traveler assistance. It must not be used for any other purpose."
10	27.075	Truckers on regional roads
11	27.085	
12	27.105	
13	27.115	Marine and recreational vehicles
14	27.125	Vintage walkie-talkies
15	27.135	
16	27.155	Offroading
17	27.165	Truckers traveling north or south
18	27.175	
19	27.185	Truckers traveling east or west
20	27.205	
21	27.215	
22	27.225	
23	27.255	
24	27.235	
25	27.245	
26	27.265	
27	27.275	
28	27.285	
29	27.295	
30	27.305	
31	27.315	
32	27.325	
33	27.335	
34	27.345	
35	27.355	
36	27.365	
37	27.375	
38	27.385	SSB calling
39	27.395	
40	27.405	

The CB Radio Service spectrum is divided into 40 numbered AM radio frequency channels from 26.965 to 27.405 MHz. Channel spacing is 10 kHz between channel centers with exceptions where CBRS channels are adjacent to Radio Control Radio Service. The initial channel allocations had a gap equal to two channel spaces between channels 22 and 23. Those channels were assigned to the Business Radio Service. Beginning in 1977, those two channels (and 15 others above CB Channel 23) were reallocated to CB use. Channel 23 was left as it was so that users of pre-1977 equipment could use that equipment with minimal confusion.

=== Channel usage ===
Channel 19 is the most commonly used channel by truck drivers on highways, to the point that some radios even have a dedicated button to bring up channel 19 instantly. In many areas of the US, other channels have been used in the past for similar purposes including 10, 17, and 21. Channel 13 has been used in some areas for marine use and for recreational vehicles.

Channel 9 is reserved by regulation for emergency use and to provide traveler assistance. In decades past, the channel was monitored by volunteers who could relay messages to the authorities, and often monitored directly by the authorities themselves. With the popularity of cellular phones since the 1990s, support for Channel 9 as an emergency channel has diminished, though volunteer organizations such as Radio Emergency Associated Communication Teams (REACT), and private individuals still monitor Channel 9 in some areas.

Regional mode conventions include Channels 30 or 35 through 40 for SSB operation, often with 38 known as a calling channel. There is no consensus yet for FM operation, legalized in 2021.

== Shared radio services ==
=== Remote control ===
Remote-control channels
Channel	Frequency	Maximum transmit power
3A	26.995 MHz	4 W
7A	27.045 MHz	4 W
11A	27.095 MHz	4 W
15A	27.145 MHz	4 W
19A	27.195 MHz	4 W
23	27.255 MHz	25 W

Among several other services that share the CB frequencies is the former Class C Citizens Band service, renamed to the Radio Control Radio Service (RCRS) in 1976, outlined in Subpart C of the Part 95 rules for radio-controlled ("R/C") devices. No voice transmissions are permitted. It has six channels in the 27 MHz band. Five are unused 10 kHz CB assignments between channels 3–4, 7–8, 11–12, 15–16 and 19–20, and the sixth is shared with Channel 23. R/C transmitters may use up to 4 watts on the first five channels and 25 watts on the last, 27.255 MHz. Some in-house paging systems, and car alarms with a paging feature, also use these frequencies, especially 27.255 MHz, where the higher power is permitted.

The 27 MHz RCRS channels are not officially numbered by the FCC. R/C enthusiasts usually designate them by color, and fly different-colored flags from the antenna to show who is on which channel.

Because of interference from CB radios, legal or otherwise, the noise level, and the limited number of channels, most "serious" hobby radio-controlled models operate on other bands.

The RCRS service has 50 channels just for model aircraft in the 72–73 MHz range, and 30 more channels for surface models such as cars and boats in the 75.4–76 MHz range. 0.75 watts is allowed on these numbered channels. Licensed amateur radio operators can use any amateur frequency for R/C, but those enthusiasts tend to use frequencies in their 6-meter band.

=== Part 15 devices ===
Many toy R/C cars and wireless keyboards and mice operate on the 27 MHz R/C channels, especially 27.145 MHz. But most of these devices run far less than 4 watts and do not operate under the RCRS service. Instead, they operate under the FCC's Part 15 rules, which allow a wide variety of low powered devices to use the frequencies from 26.96 to 27.28 MHz, which covers CB Channels 1 through 27.

Some other of the R/C toys operate on the 49 MHz Part 15 channels, and often a pair of R/C cars will be sold with one on 27.145 and one on 49.860 to avoid interference. This allows less selective, and therefore less expensive, receivers to be used than if they were using channels in the same band.

In the days when CB required a license, some low-powered or toy walkie-talkies were exempt because they operated within Part 15. However, in 1976, the FCC phased in a shift of these 100 mW devices to the 49 MHz band, with operation on the CB frequencies to cease in 1983. More recently in the 1990s, low-powered handhelds using FM voice on the 27 MHz radio-control channels were also sold to operate legally under Part 15.

Broadband over Power Lines (BPL) technology uses a wide range of HF frequencies to transmit data (3.5 through 30 MHz), which includes the CB frequencies. There is great potential for interference, as power lines were never specifically designed to shield radio frequencies. RF leakage from BPL is regulated under Part 15 and is a big problem for amateur radio operators across all frequencies that the BPL uses.

=== ISM devices ===
Another class of devices operating in the 27 MHz band are ISM (Industrial, Scientific and Medical) devices regulated by the FCC's Part 18 rules. Induction welding of plastics, and some types of diathermy machines commonly operate in this range. These devices centered on 27.12 MHz with a tolerance of ±163 kHz, that is, 26.957 to 27.283 MHz.

== Adjacent frequency bands ==
Adjacent frequencies are often used by illegal operators using modified CB or amateur radio equipment. Operators sometimes refer to this activity as freebanding.

The Industrial/Business Radio Pool of the Private Land Mobile Radio Services has several channels just above the Citizen's Band, at 27.430, 27.450, 27.470, 27.490, 27.510, and 27.530 MHz.

The federal government has the frequencies from 27.540 up to 28.000. Many civilian agencies use, or used to use, the frequencies 27.575 and 27.585 for low-power use. The US Coast Guard Auxiliary uses 27.980 MHz, it is similar to the Civil Air Patrol Frequency 26.620 MHz.

Amateur radio has an allocation starting at 28.000 MHz in the 10-meter band.

Below the Citizen's Band, the military has the frequencies from 26.480 to 26.960 MHz. The Civil Air Patrol has 26.620 MHz, though it now uses mostly VHF frequencies. In the 1950s through the 1970s CAP volunteers with crystal-controlled CBs would put this frequency in their radios. Currently VHF military frequencies are more often used (the CAP is part of the US Air Force), as among other reasons, VHF radios are easier to acquire through military logistics than CB radios.

Below that is a broadcast auxiliary service band, the 11-meter shortwave band, and the 12-meter amateur band.
