= 27 MHz CB27/81 Bandplan =

List of radio channel frequencies

The 27 MHz CB27/81 Bandplan is a list of the channel frequencies for FM CB radio in the United Kingdom.

Unlike CB usage in the United States, and subsequently elsewhere in the world, the original UK 40 channels progress in order with 10 kHz spacing. These channels apply to UK-only radios meeting MPT-1320 (marked CB 27/81) and MPT-1382 (marked PR 27/97, these may also feature the additional 40 CEPT channels). In 2006, the UK 27/81 Bandplan was introduced by the Republic of Ireland's Comreg as one of two sets of channels available for the Wireless Public Address System (WPAS) licensing scheme (similar to the UK's CADS – Community Audio Distribution System), as many Irish churches were already illegally using UK 27/81 CB equipment for this purpose. Usage of the 27/81 channels for CB however remains illegal in the Republic of Ireland, though usage has been noted in areas near the Northern Ireland border.

CB27/81 Radio Channels
Channel	Frequency [MHz]	Channel	Frequency [MHz]
1	27.60125	21	27.80125
2	27.61125	22	27.81125
3	27.62125	23	27.82125
4	27.63125	24	27.83125
5	27.64125	25	27.84125
6	27.65125	26	27.85125
7	27.66125	27	27.86125
8	27.67125	28	27.87125
9	27.68125	29	27.88125
10	27.69125	30	27.89125
11	27.70125	31	27.90125
12	27.71125	32	27.91125
13	27.72125	33	27.92125
14	27.73125	34	27.93125
15	27.74125	35	27.94125
16	27.75125	36	27.95125
17	27.76125	37	27.96125
18	27.77125	38	27.97125
19	27.78125	39	27.98125
20	27.79125	40	27.99125

By convention, channel 9 is set aside for emergency use, channel 14 is a 'calling' channel, where one CBer can call someone else before they both move to another channel for the bulk of their conversation. Channel 19 is commonly used by mobile stations (in vehicles).
