= Noise blanker =

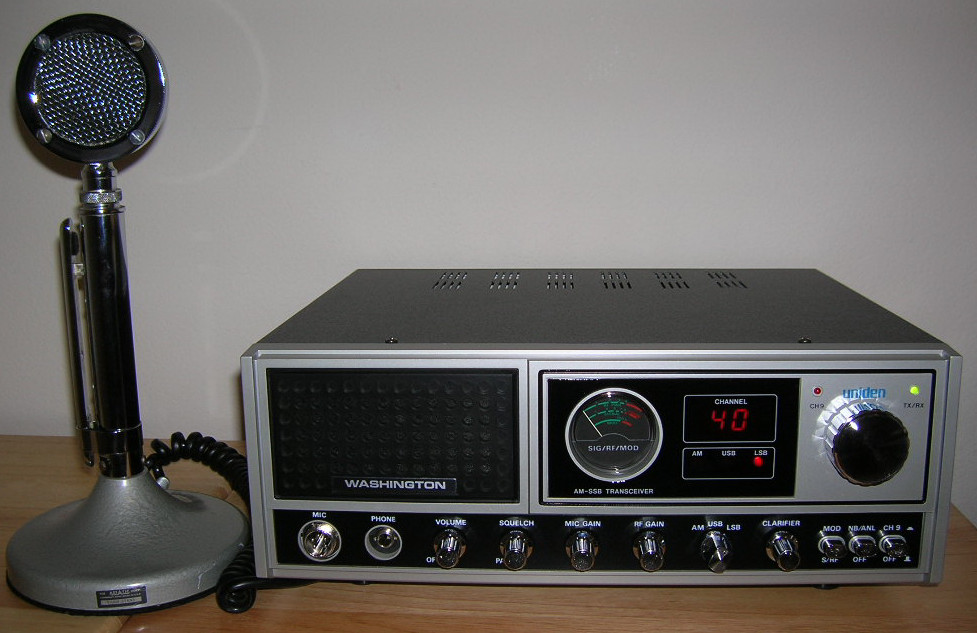
A Citizen's Band transceiver equipped with a noise blanker for the receiver, controlled by a button on the front panel (2nd from right)

In the design of radio receivers, a noise blanker is a circuit intended to reduce the effect of certain kinds of radio noise on a received signal. It is often used on broadcast shortwave receivers or communications receivers and some types of two-way radio transceivers. The noise blanker is only effective on impulse-type noise such as from lightning or from automotive ignition systems, and cannot improve performance on wideband continuous background noise, or interfering signals on the same frequency. In cases where there are strong signals on frequencies near to the desired frequency, a noise blanker circuit may be ineffective and may reduce the quality of the received signal.

== Implementation ==
Typically this is a network in the intermediate frequency section of the receiver; when a pulse of noise passes through the IF amplifiers, it is usually of greater amplitude than the desired signal. The noise blanker circuit momentarily reduces the gain of the IF stage during the impulse. More complex noise blankers may use a secondary IF stage and have adjustable threshold and timing characteristics so as to reduce the noise passed through to the audio stages of the receiver.

A noise blanker is best applied before any narrow-bandwidth filters in the signal path, so as not to introduce "ringing" and distortion in the filtered signal. Noise blankers are most useful with amplitude modulation or single sideband signals. Frequency modulation receivers generally include a signal limiter stage which tends to reject noise pulses.

== See also ==
- Noise reduction
