= MK 301 =

MK 301 clandestine radio receiver on display at the Cold War section of the International Museum of World War II in Natick, Massachusetts

The MK 301 is a miniature, valve-based British clandestine radio receiver developed in the Cold War for "Stay-behind" spy networks. It was designed in 1954 by S.G. Hart at the Her Majesty's Government Communications Centre (HMGCC), as a replacement for the bulky WW2 era MCR-1 radio and similar devices. Around only about 800 units of this spy radio were ever produced.
