= Association of Lowland Search And Rescue =

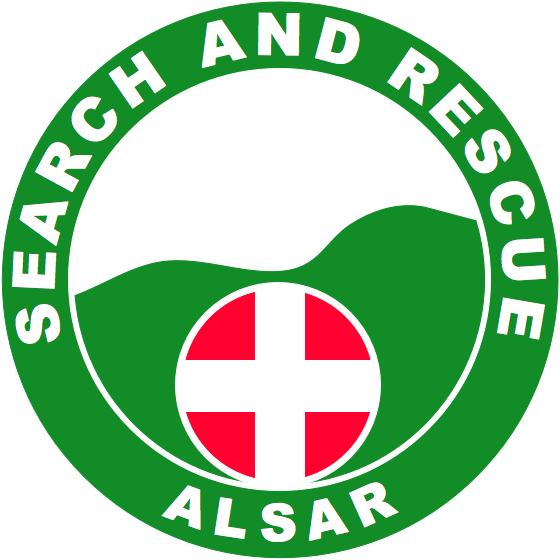
Association of Lowland Search & Rescue

Association of Lowland Search And Rescue (ALSAR), typically known as Lowland Rescue, is a voluntary organisation in the UK which provides teams who assist the emergency services in the search for missing persons. It is part of the UKSAR operators group appointed by the Department for Transport.

The role of Lowland Rescue is to:

- Coordinate the provision of Lowland SAR Services
- Set Standards
- Represent and Support Lowland SAR teams nationally
- Develop and shape Lowland SAR

Lowland Rescue consists of 36 affiliated search teams and over 1800 trained Search Technicians, covering 34% of the UK and contributing over 200,000 person hours to Search and Rescue each year. Nobody in Lowland Rescue is paid for their work.
