= Spurious tone =

In electronics (radio in particular), a spurious tone (also known as an interfering tone, a continuous tone or a spur) denotes a tone in an electronic circuit which interferes with a signal and is often masked underneath that signal. Spurious tones are any tones other than a fundamental tone or its harmonics. They also include tones generated within the back-to-back connected transmit and receive terminal or channel units, when the fundamental is applied to the transmit terminal or channel-unit input.
