= Peak envelope power =

Measure of radio transmission power

Representation of the peak envelope power (PEP) using the example of an AM-modulated signal. The PEP is the power area shown in red.

Peak envelope power (PEP) is the average power over a single radio frequency cycle at the crest of the modulation. PEP is normally considered the power output at the occasional or continuously repeating crest of the modulation envelope under normal operating conditions. Many regulatory authorities use PEP to set maximum power standards for radio transmitters.

== AM PEP ==
Assuming linear, perfectly symmetrical, 100% modulation of a carrier, PEP output of an AM transmitter is four times its carrier PEP; in other words, a typical modern 100-watt amateur transceiver is usually rated for no more than, and often less than, 25 watts carrier output when operating in AM.

== PEP vs. average power ==
PEP is equal to steady carrier power, or radiotelegraph dot or dash average power, in a properly-formed CW transmission. PEP is also equal to average power in a steady FM, FSK, or RTTY transmission.

Although average power is the same as PEP for complex modulation forms, such as FSK, the peak envelope power bears no particular ratio or mathematical relationship to longer-term average power in distorted envelopes, such as a CW waveform with power overshoot, or with amplitude modulated waveforms, such as SSB or AM voice transmissions. Typical average power of a SSB voice transmission, for example, is 10-20% of PEP. The percentage of longer term average power to PEP increases with processing, and commonly reaches ~50% with extreme speech processing.

== PEP level control ==
Most modern amateur transceivers sample PEP to adjust power, using an ALC (automatic level control) system. Time delay in the ALC system and finite time of RF signals passing through multiple stages, in particular narrow filters, often gives rise to unusual envelope distortion. This distortion commonly appears as envelope power overshoot on leading edges, and sometimes causes negative carrier shift on AM. Some more poorly designed transceivers have a short term envelope power overshoot several times the steady-state PEP setting. This envelope overshoot further complicates definitions of PEP and average power.

PEP was often used in non-broadcast AM applications because it most accurately described the potential of mobile transmitters to interfere with each other. Its use is now somewhat deprecated, with the average transmitter power output (or sometimes average effective radiated power) now typically being preferred.

== See also ==
- Federal Standard 1037C
