= List of Asian television stations =

List of Asian television stations is a list of television stations which are notable in Asia. Notability refers to them being the dominant stations within their region/countries in terms of viewers.

== See also ==
- Television system
- Television antenna
- Television station
- Television network
- Television channel
- Multichannel television
- Television channel frequencies
- Asian television frequencies
- Pay television
- Television receive-only
- Broadcast television systems
- Terrestrial television
- Satellite television
- Channel drift
- List of television networks by country
