= PMSE =

PMSE can refer to:

- Polar mesospheric summer echoes, the phenomenon of anomalous radar echoes found in the polar atmosphere.
- Programme making and special events, a term used to denote equipment that is used to support broadcasting and other events.
- Polymeric Materials: Science and Engineering Division, part of the American Chemical Society
