= Television channel frequencies =

Tables of radio frequencies assigned to television channels

The following tables show the frequencies assigned to analog broadcast television channels in various regions of the world, along with the ITU letter designator for the transmission system used. The frequencies shown are for the channel limits and for the analog video and audio carriers. The channel itself usually occupies 6, 7 or 8 megahertz of bandwidth depending on the television transmission system in use. For example, North American channel 1 occupies the spectrum from 44 to 50 MHz. See Broadcast television systems for a table of signal characteristics, including bandwidth, by ITU letter designator. Analog television broadcasts have been phased out in most regions, having been replaced by digital television broadcasts.

== International normalization for analog TV systems ==
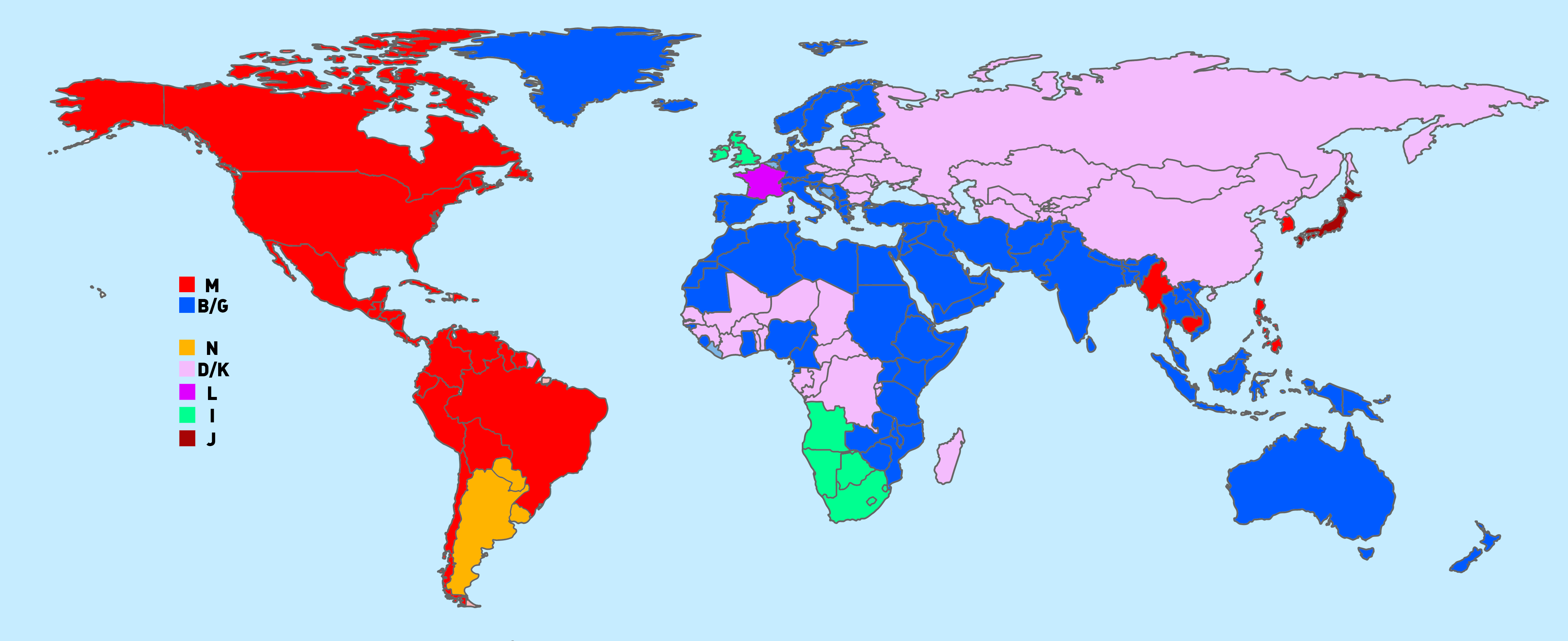
Analog television system by nation

International broadcasting television frequencies are divided in two part of the spectrum; the Very high frequency or "VHF" band and the Ultra high frequency or "UHF" band.

== VHF ==
A plan showing frequency ranges for each television channel used on VHF

=== Americas (most countries), South Korea, Taiwan, Myanmar, and the Philippines ===
During World War II, the frequencies originally assigned as channels 13 to 18 were appropriated by the U.S. military, which still uses them to this day. It was also decided to move the allocation for FM radio from the 42-50 MHz band to a larger 88-106 MHz band (later extended to the current 88-108 MHz FM band). This required a reassignment of the VHF channels to the plan currently in use.

==== Assignments since February 25, 1946 ====
- System M 525 lines (most countries in the Americas and Caribbean, South Korea, Taiwan and the Philippines)
- System N 625 lines (used in Argentina, Paraguay and Uruguay)

VHF low-band (band I)
Channel	Lower edge	ATSC 1 pilot	Video carrier	ISDB-T/Tb center	Audio carrier	Upper edge
1	44	44.31	45.25	47.142857	49.75	50
(Gap in band plan used by amateur radio 6-meter band)
2	54	54.31	55.25	57.142857	59.75	60
3	60	60.31	61.25	63.142857	65.75	66
4	66	66.31	67.25	69.142857	71.75	72
(Gap in band plan used by aeronautical navigation)
5	76	76.31	77.25	79.142857	81.75	82
6	82	82.31	83.25	85.142857	87.75	88

- FM channel 200, 87.9 MHz, overlaps TV 6. This is used only by K200AA.
- TV 6 analog audio can be heard on FM 87.75 on most broadcast radio receivers as well as on a European TV tuned to channel E4A or channel IC, but at lower volume than wideband FM broadcast stations, because of the lower deviation.
- Channel 1 audio is the same as European Channel E2 audio and the video is the same as European Channel E2A. Channel 2 video is the same as European Channel E3 video.

VHF high-band (band III)
Channel	Lower edge	ATSC 1 pilot	Video carrier	ISDB-T/Tb center	Audio carrier	Upper edge
7	174	174.31	175.25	177.142857	179.75	180
8	180	180.31	181.25	183.142857	185.75	186
9	186	186.31	187.25	189.142857	191.75	192
10	192	192.31	193.25	195.142857	197.75	198
11	198	198.31	199.25	201.142857	203.75	204
12	204	204.31	205.25	207.142857	209.75	210
13	210	210.31	211.25	213.142857	215.75	216

=== Japan ===
- The frequency spacing for each channel is 6 MHz as the countries above, except between channels 7 and 8 (which overlap).
- Channels 1 through 3 are reallocated for the expansion of the FM band.

VHF low-band
Channel	Lower edge	Video carrier	ISDB-T center frequency	Audio carrier	Upper edge
J1	90	91.25	93.142857	95.75	96
J2	96	97.25	99.142857	101.75	102
J3	102	103.25	105.142857	107.75	108

VHF high-band
Channel	Lower edge	Video carrier	ISDB-T center frequency	Audio carrier	Upper edge
J4	170	171.25	173.142857	175.75	176
J5	176	177.25	179.142857	181.75	182
J6	182	183.25	185.142857	187.75	188
J7	188	189.25	191.142857	193.75	194
J8	192	193.25	195.142857	197.75	198
J9	198	199.25	201.142857	203.75	204
J10	204	205.25	207.142857	209.75	210
J11	210	211.25	213.142857	215.75	216
J12	216	217.25	219.142857	221.75	222

=== United Kingdom, Ireland, and Hong Kong ===
System A 405 lines (discontinued in 1985)
Channel	Upper edge (MHz)	Video carrier (MHz)	Audio carrier (MHz)	Lower edge (MHz)
B1	45.25	45.00	41.50	40.25
B2	52	51.75	48.25	47
B3	57	56.75	53.25	52
B4	62	61.75	58.25	57
B5	67	66.75	63.25	62
B6	180	179.75	176.25	175
B7	185	184.75	181.25	180
B8	190	189.75	186.25	185
B9	195	194.75	191.25	190
B10	200	199.75	196.25	195
B11	205	204.75	201.25	200
B12	210	209.75	206.25	205
B13	215	214.75	211.25	210

==== Ireland ====
System I 625 lines
Channel	Lower edge (MHz)	Video carrier (MHz)	Audio carrier (MHz)	Upper edge (MHz)
EA	44.5	45.75	51.75	52.5
EB	52.5	53.75	59.75	60.5
EC	60.5	61.75	67.75	68.5
ED	174	175.25	181.25	182
EE	182	183.25	189.25	190
EF	190	191.25	197.25	198
EG	198	199.25	205.25	206
EH	206	207.25	213.25	214
EI	214	215.25	221.25	222
EJ	222	223.25	229.25	230

- Channel A was never used terrestrially. The only System I Band I transmitter on Channel B was RTÉ One from the Maghera, Co. Clare transmitter during 1963–1999. Channel A was initially intended for use at Maghera but Channel B was used instead because of the risk of interference to (overspill) reception of BBC 405 line transmissions. It was moved to Channel E due to interference from distant transmitters on channel E3 and Italian channel IA via certain atmospheric conditions and other reasons. Channel C was used by a relay transmitter in Glanmire, Co. Cork.
- Channel B video is the same as Italian Channel IA video and Channel C audio is the same as Channel E4 audio.
- There are currently no Band I Channels used in Ireland (except on cable TV, and these have mostly been phased out for DOCSIS use) and no plans to resume using them.
- Most Irish Cable TV systems do not follow the above channel plan as their analogue (video) carriers are usually at multiples of 8 MHz (i.e. 176, 184, 192 MHz etc. in Band III)

=== Western Europe; Greenland; and most countries in Asia, Africa, and Oceania ===
System B 625 lines
Channel	Video carrier (MHz)	DVB-T/T2 (MHz)	Audio carrier (MHz)
E1	41.25	43.5	46.75
E1A	42.25	44.5	47.75
E2	48.25	50.5	53.75
E2A	49.75	52	55.25
E3	55.25	57.5	60.75
E4	62.25	64.5	67.75
E4A	82.25	84.5	87.75
E5	175.25	177.5	180.75
E6	182.25	184.5	187.75
E7	189.25	191.5	194.75
E8	196.25	198.5	201.75
E9	203.25	205.5	208.75
E10	210.25	212.5	215.75
E11	217.25	219.5	222.75
E12	224.25	226.5	229.75

- Channels 1 and 1A were used for early experimental broadcasts and are no longer allocated.
- Channels 15 and 16 are allocated for use in the African Broadcasting Area only.
- Channel 2A was only ever used in Austria for the Sendeturm Jauerling to avoid interferences with neighboring Eastern European TV stations.
- Channel 3 in Belgium, RTBF 1 broadcast from the Liège transmitter with 100 kW until the switchover to DVB-T.
- Channel 12 was reserved by the military in some countries (like Germany (West Germany only)) so only relay transmitters operated on this frequency.
- Channel 4A audio carrier's frequency is very close to US Channel 6 audio carrier and overlaps the FM band in Europe.

=== France ===
System E 819 lines (discontinued in 1986)
Channel	Video carrier (MHz)	Audio carrier (MHz)
1	46.00	42.00
2	52.40	41.25
3	56.15	67.30
4	65.55	54.40
5	164.00	175.15
6	173.40	162.25
7	177.15	188.30
8A	185.25	174.10
8	186.55	175.40
9	190.30	201.45
10	199.70	188.55
11	203.45	214.60
12	212.85	201.70

- Channel 1 used an earlier 441-line system and was discontinued in 1956.

System L 625 lines
Channel	Video carrier (MHz)	Audio carrier (MHz)
L1	47.75	41.25
L2	55.75	49.25
L3	60.50	54.00
L4	63.75	57.25
L5	176.00	182.50
L6	184.00	190.50
L7	192.00	198.50
L8	200.00	206.50
L9	208.00	214.50
L10	216.00	222.50

=== French overseas departments and territories and former French African colonies ===
System K 625 lines
Channel	Video carrier (MHz)	Audio carrier (MHz)
K2	52.25	58.75
K3	60.25	66.75
K4	175.25	181.75
K5	183.25	189.75
K6	191.25	197.75
K7	199.25	205.75
K8	207.25	213.75
K9	215.25	221.75
K10	223.25	229.75

=== Italy ===
System B 625 lines (discontinued in 2009)
Channel	Video carrier (MHz)	Audio carrier (MHz)
IA	53.75	59.25
IB	62.25	67.75
IC	82.25	87.75
ID	175.25	180.75
IE	183.75	189.25
IF	192.25	197.75
IG	201.25	206.75
IH	210.25	215.75
IH1	217.25	222.75
IH2	224.25	229.75

- Channels A through H are indicated in many European TVs as Channels 13–20.
- Channels B, C, D, H, H1, and H2 are identical to Channels E4, E4A, E5, E10, E11, and E12, respectively.
- Channel A video carrier is the same as Channel E2 audio carrier and thus it used to be common that the audio from a distant TV station on channel E2 received via Sporadic E interferes with Channel A video and vice versa.
- Channel C audio carrier's frequency falls into the FM band in Europe, and is also identical to American A6 channel audio.

=== Eastern Europe, North Korea ===
Original OIR assignments System D 625 lines
Channel	Video carrier (MHz)	Audio carrier (MHz)
I	41.75	48.25
II	49.75	56.25
III	59.25	65.75
IV	77.25	83.75
1	145.25	151.75
2	153.25	159.75
3	161.25	167.75
4	169.25	175.75
5	177.25	183.75
6	185.25	191.75
7	193.25	199.75
8	201.25	207.75
9	209.25	215.75

Assignments since 1965 System D 625 lines
Channel	Video carrier (MHz)	Audio carrier (MHz)
R1	49.75	56.25
R2	59.25	65.75
R3	77.25	83.75
R4	85.25	91.75
R5	93.25	99.75
R6	175.25	181.75
R7	183.25	189.75
R8	191.25	197.75
R9	199.25	205.75
R10	207.25	213.75
R11	215.25	221.75
R12	223.25	229.75

=== East Germany (former DDR) ===
In its very early days DFF made some test transmissions using the D/K standard (6.5 MHz audio) before reverting (around 1957) to System B/G (5.5 MHz audio) but using some unique frequencies.

Channel	Channel limits (MHz)	Vision carrier (MHz)	Main sound carrier (MHz)	Notes
1 (Pre 1957)	41.00–49.00	41.75	48.25	Identical to old OIR Ch I, also overlaps of Australian channel AU0
2 (Pre 1957)	58.50–66.50	59.25	65.75	Identical to old OIR Ch III (Overlaps western channels E3 and E4 and Australian channels AU1 and AU2)
3 (Pre 1957)	99.15–107.15	99.90	106.40	Overlaps part of Western FM radio broadcast band and Australian channels AU4 and AU5
4 (Pre 1957)	144.50–152.50	145.25	151.75	Overlaps 2m Amateur radio band
1 (1957–1960)	58.00–65.00	59.25	64.75	Same video freq as pre-1957 Ch 2 (but 5.5 MHz sound) Overlaps western channels E3 and E4
2 (1957–1960)	144.00–151.00	145.25	150.75	Overlaps 2m Amateur radio band
3 (1957–1960)	154.00–161.00	155.25	160.75	Overlaps Marine VHF radio band
E5	174.00–181.00	175.25	180.75	Identical to western Channel E5, overlaps Australian channel AU6
E6	181.00–188.00	182.25	187.75	Identical to western Channel E6, overlaps Australian channel AU7
E8	195.00–202.00	196.25	201.75	Identical to western Channel E8, overlaps Australian channel AU9
E11	216.00–223.00	217.25	222.75	Identical to western Channel E11, overlaps Australian channel AU11

- From 1960 onwards (West) European standard channels were adopted.

=== Morocco ===
System B 625 lines
Channel	Video carrier (MHz)	Audio carrier (MHz)
M4	163.25	168.75
M5	171.25	176.75
M6	179.25	184.75
M7	187.25	192.75
M8	195.25	200.75
M9	203.25	208.75
M10	211.25	216.75

=== Australia ===
System B 625 lines (7 MHz / channel)
Channel	Video carrier (MHz)	Audio carrier (MHz)	Center (QAM) frequency (MHz)
0*	46.25	51.75	48.5
1*	57.25	62.75	59.5
2*	64.25	69.75	66.5
3*	86.25	91.75	88.5
4*	95.25	100.75	97.5
5*	102.25	107.75	104.5
5A*	138.25	143.75	140.5
6	175.25	180.75	177.5
7	182.25	187.75	184.5
8	189.25	194.75	191.5
9	196.25	201.75	198.5
9A**	203.25	208.75	205.5
10**	210.25	215.75	212.5
11**	217.25	222.75	219.5
12**	224.25	229.75	226.5

* Channels 0, 1, 2, 3, 4, 5 and 5A were discontinued with the changeover to digital television.

** With the transition to digital television in 2001, Channels 10 and 11 (209.25 and 216.25 respectively) were moved up by 1 MHz to allow a full 7 MHz separation for a new channel 9A, and Channel 12 was added. Some existing services were affected, notably AMV11 in the Upper Murray region of Victoria, and VTV-11 in Western Victoria.

=== New Zealand and Indonesia ===
System B 625 lines (7 MHz / channel)
Channel	Video carrier (MHz)	Audio carrier (MHz)
G1A	44.25	49.75
G1	45.25	50.75
G2	55.25	60.75
G3	62.25	67.75
G4	175.25	180.75
G5	182.25	187.75
G6	189.25	194.75
G7	196.25	201.75
G8	203.25	208.75
G9	210.25	215.75
G10	217.25	222.75
G11	224.25	229.75

- VHF analog TV ceased in New Zealand on 1 December 2013.
- Channels 10 and 11 weren't added until the late 1980s.
- VHF analog TV channel 1A is only used in Indonesia.
- VHF is currently no longer used for television in Indonesia (except in some regions until 2022) and only UHF is used for both analog and digital television, as in the UK.
- In Indonesia, VHF channels 4 to 11 have been reallocated for digital radio broadcasting purposes with DRM and DAB systems, in accordance with Ministry of Communications and Information Technology Regulation number 5 of 2023.

=== Angola, Botswana, Lesotho, and South Africa ===
System I 625 lines
Channel	Video carrier (MHz)	Audio carrier (MHz)	Remarks
1	43.25	49.25	Never used terrestrially
2	52.25	58.25	Never used terrestrially
3	60.25	66.25	Never used terrestrially
4	175.25	181.25	Identical to Irish Channel D
5	183.25	189.25	Identical to Irish Channel E
6	191.25	197.25	Identical to Irish Channel F
7	199.25	205.25	Identical to Irish Channel G
8	207.25	213.25	Identical to Irish Channel H
9	215.25	221.25	Identical to Irish Channel I
10	223.25	229.25	Identical to Irish Channel J
11	231.25	237.25	
12	239.25	245.25	Never used terrestrially
13	247.25	253.25	

=== China ===
Old assignments (1958-1969) System D 625 lines
Channel	Frequency range (MHz)	Video carrier (MHz)	Audio carrier (MHz)
1	48.5–56.5	49.75	56.25
2	56.5–64.5	57.75	64.25
3	76–84	77.25	83.75
4	84–92	85.25	91.75
5	92–100	93.25	99.75

New assignments since 1970System D 625 lines
Channel	Frequency range (MHz)	Video carrier (MHz)	Audio carrier (MHz)	DTMB center frequency (MHz)
VHF low-band
DS-1	48.5–56.5	49.75	56.25	52.5
DS-2	56.5–64.5	57.75	64.25	60.5
DS-3	64.5–72.5	65.75	72.25	68.5
DS-4	76–84	77.25	83.75	80
DS-5	84–92	85.25	91.75	88
VHF high-band (Band III)
DS-6	167–175	168.25	174.25	171
DS-7	175–183	176.25	182.75	179
DS-8	183–191	184.25	190.75	187
DS-9	191–199	192.25	198.75	195
DS-10	199–207	200.25	206.75	203
DS-11	207–215	208.25	214.75	211
DS-12	215–223	216.25	222.75	219

=== Vietnam ===
System D 625 lines
Channel	Frequency range (MHz)	Video carrier (MHz)	Audio carrier (MHz)	DVB-T2 center frequency (Mhz)
Band II
3	76–84	77.25	83.25	80
Band III
6	174–182	175.25	181.75	178
7	182–190	183.25	189.75	186
8	190–198	191.25	197.75	194
9	198–206	199.25	205.75	202
10	206–214	207.25	213.75	210
11	214–222	215.25	221.75	223
12	222–230	223.25	229.75	231

== UHF ==
=== Americas (most countries), South Korea, Taiwan, Burma (Myanmar) and the Philippines ===
For frequencies used in the Americas (most countries), South Korea, Taiwan and the Philippines, refer to Pan-American television frequencies.

Notes

- The frequencies used by UHF channels 70 through 83 were reallocated to the Land Mobile Radio System (Public Safety and Trunked Radio) and mobile phones in a CCIR worldwide convention in 1982, and thus were never used for digital TV but are highlighted in cyan and listed here for theoretical use.
- In certain metropolitan areas of the United States, Channels 14 through 20 have been allocated to Land Mobile Radio (LMR) use.
- Channels 52 through 69 in the United States have been reallocated now that conversion to digital TV was completed on June 12, 2009. These channels are highlighted in yellow. Channels 70 through 83 in the United States and Canada were re-allocated to AMPS cellular phone use in 1983.
- On August 22, 2011, the United States' Federal Communications Commission announced a freeze on all future applications for broadcast stations requesting to use channel 51, to prevent adjacent-channel interference to the A-Block of the 700 MHz band. Later that year (on December 16, 2011), Industry Canada and the CRTC followed suit in placing a moratorium on future television stations using Channel 51 for broadcast use, to prevent adjacent-channel interference to the A-Block of the 700 MHz band.
- Not all countries listed use ATSC, which has a single VSB carrier wave. Other countries use COFDM modulation for DVB-T (Taiwan, Colombia, Panama) or ISDB-Tb (Philippines and Latin America), which has dozens of carriers within the channel. Burma (Myanmar) uses DVB-T2 on 8 MHz channel spacing on Western Europe / Asia DTV frequency along with Southeast Asian countries (except Philippines).
- ISDB-Tb frequency DTV channel 14 uses 473.142857 MHz, but ATSC 3.0, DVB-T/DVB-T2, and DTMB, use 473.0 MHz.
- Channel 37 is reserved for radio astronomy in the United States, Canada, Bermuda, Belize, and the Bahamas, thus there are no television stations assigned to it. Mexico also informally observes a ban on transmitters using this channel.
- Due to the FCC repack in the United States, all TV stations that had been broadcasting from channels 38 to 51 were required to move on or below channel 36 by July 3, 2020. As a result, channels 38-51 are highlighted in magenta. These frequencies would later be used by U.S. mobile carriers like T-Mobile on Band 71.

System M 525 lines (most countries in the Americas and Caribbean, South Korea, Burma (Myanmar) Taiwan and the Philippines) System N 625 lines (Argentina, Paraguay and Uruguay)
Channel	Lower edge	ATSC 1 pilot	Video carrier	ISDB-T/Tb center	Audio carrier	Upper edge
14	470	470.31	471.25	473.142857	475.75	476
15	476	476.31	477.25	479.142857	481.75	482
16	482	482.31	483.25	485.142857	487.75	488
17	488	488.31	489.25	491.142857	493.75	494
18	494	494.31	495.25	497.142857	499.75	500
500 MHz band
19	500	500.31	501.25	503.142857	505.75	506
20	506	506.31	507.25	509.142857	511.75	512
21	512	512.31	513.25	515.142857	517.75	518
22	518	518.31	519.25	521.142857	523.75	524
23	524	524.31	525.25	527.142857	529.75	530
24	530	530.31	531.25	533.142857	535.75	536
25	536	536.31	537.25	539.142857	541.75	542
26	542	542.31	543.25	545.142857	547.75	548
27	548	548.31	549.25	551.142857	553.75	554
28	554	554.31	555.25	557.142857	559.75	560
29	560	560.31	561.25	563.142857	565.75	566
30	566	566.31	567.25	569.142857	571.75	572
31	572	572.31	573.25	575.142857	577.75	578
32	578	578.31	579.25	581.142857	583.75	584
33	584	584.31	585.25	587.142857	589.75	590
34	590	590.31	591.25	593.142857	595.75	596
600 MHz band
35	596	596.31	597.25	599.142857	601.75	602
36	602	602.31	603.25	605.142857	607.75	608
37	608	608.31	609.25	611.142857	613.75	614
38	614	614.31	615.25	617.142857	619.75	620
39	620	620.31	621.25	623.142857	625.75	626
40	626	626.31	627.25	629.142857	631.75	632
41	632	632.31	633.25	635.142857	637.75	638
42	638	638.31	639.25	641.142857	643.75	644
43	644	644.31	645.25	647.142857	649.75	650
44	650	650.31	651.25	653.142857	655.75	656
45	656	656.31	657.25	659.142857	661.75	662
46	662	662.31	663.25	665.142857	667.75	668
47	668	668.31	669.25	671.142857	673.75	674
48	674	674.31	675.25	677.142857	679.75	680
49	680	680.31	681.25	683.142857	685.75	686
50	686	686.31	687.25	689.142857	691.75	692
51	692	692.31	693.25	695.142857	697.75	698
700 MHz band
52	698	698.31	699.25	701.142857	703.75	704
53	704	704.31	705.25	707.142857	709.75	710
54	710	710.31	711.25	713.142857	715.75	716
55	716	716.31	717.25	719.142857	721.75	722
56	722	722.31	723.25	725.142857	727.75	728
57	728	728.31	729.25	731.142857	733.75	734
58	734	734.31	735.25	737.142857	739.75	740
59	740	740.31	741.25	743.142857	745.75	746
60	746	746.31	747.25	749.142857	751.75	752
61	752	752.31	753.25	755.142857	757.75	758
62	758	758.31	759.25	761.142857	763.75	764
63	764	764.31	765.25	767.142857	769.75	770
64	770	770.31	771.25	773.142857	775.75	776
65	776	776.31	777.25	779.142857	781.75	782
66	782	782.31	783.25	785.142857	787.75	788
67	788	788.31	789.25	791.142857	793.75	794
68	794	794.31	795.25	797.142857	799.75	800
800 MHz band
69	800	800.31	801.25	803.142857	805.75	806
70	806	806.31	807.25	809.142857	811.75	812
71	812	812.31	813.25	815.142857	817.75	818
72	818	818.31	819.25	821.142857	823.75	824
73	824	824.31	825.25	827.142857	829.75	830
74	830	830.31	831.25	833.142857	835.75	836
75	836	836.31	837.25	839.142857	841.75	842
76	842	842.31	843.25	845.142857	847.75	848
77	848	848.31	849.25	851.142857	853.75	854
78	854	854.31	855.25	857.142857	859.75	860
79	860	860.31	861.25	863.142857	865.75	866
80	866	866.31	867.25	869.142857	871.75	872
81	872	872.31	873.25	875.142857	877.75	878
82	878	878.31	879.25	881.142857	883.75	884
83	884	884.31	885.25	887.142857	889.75	890

=== Japan ===
Frequency spacing for each channel in Japan is the same as in the countries listed above, but the channel numbers are 1 lower than in those countries; for example, channel 13 in Japan is on the same frequency as channel 14 in North and South America (most countries), South Korea, Taiwan, and the Philippines.

Channels 13-62 are used for both analog and digital TV broadcasting, while channel 53-62 are obsolete for digital broadcasting.

System J 525 lines
Ch	Video (MHz)	Audio (MHz)	ISDB-T center
13	471.25	475.75	473.142857
14	477.25	481.75	479.142857
15	483.25	487.75	485.142857
16	489.25	493.75	491.142857
17	495.25	499.75	497.142857
18	501.25	505.75	503.142857
19	507.25	511.75	509.142857
20	513.25	517.75	515.142857
21	519.25	523.75	521.142857
22	525.25	529.75	527.142857
23	531.25	535.75	533.142857
24	537.25	541.75	539.142857
25	543.25	547.75	545.142857
26	549.25	553.75	551.142857
27	555.25	559.75	557.142857
28	561.25	565.75	563.142857
29	567.25	571.75	569.142857
30	573.25	577.75	575.142857
31	579.25	583.75	581.142857
32	585.25	589.75	587.142857
33	591.25	595.75	593.142857
34	597.25	601.75	599.142857
35	603.25	607.75	605.142857
36	609.25	613.75	611.142857
37	615.25	619.75	617.142857
38	621.25	625.75	623.142857
39	627.25	631.75	629.142857
40	633.25	637.75	635.142857
41	639.25	643.75	641.142857
42	645.25	649.75	647.142857
43	651.25	655.75	653.142857
44	657.25	661.75	659.142857
45	663.25	667.75	665.142857
46	669.25	673.75	671.142857
47	675.25	679.75	677.142857
48	681.25	685.75	683.142857
49	687.25	691.75	689.142857
50	693.25	697.75	695.142857
51	699.25	703.75	701.142857
52	705.25	709.75	707.142857
53	711.25	715.75	713.142857
54	717.25	721.75	719.142857
55	723.25	727.75	725.142857
56	729.25	733.75	731.142857
57	735.25	739.75	737.142857
58	741.25	745.75	743.142857
59	747.25	751.75	749.142857
60	753.25	757.75	755.142857
61	759.25	763.75	761.142857
62	765.25	769.75	767.142857

=== United Kingdom, Ireland, Hong Kong, Macau, Falkland Islands and Southern Africa ===
System I 625 lines
Channel	Video carrier (MHz)	Audio carrier (MHz)
21	471.25	477.25
22	479.25	485.25
23	487.25	493.25
24	495.25	501.25
25	503.25	509.25
26	511.25	517.25
27	519.25	525.25
28	527.25	533.25
29	535.25	541.25
30	543.25	549.25
31	551.25	557.25
32	559.25	565.25
33	567.25	573.25
34	575.25	581.25
35	583.25	589.25
36	591.25	597.25
37	599.25	605.25
38	607.25	613.25
39	615.25	621.25
40	623.25	629.25
41	631.25	637.25
42	639.25	645.25
43	647.25	653.25
44	655.25	661.25
45	663.25	669.25
46	671.25	677.25
47	679.25	685.25
48	687.25	693.25
49	695.25	701.25
50	703.25	709.25
51	711.25	717.25
52	719.25	725.25
53	727.25	733.25
54	735.25	741.25
55	743.25	749.25
56	751.25	757.25
57	759.25	765.25
58	767.25	773.25
59	775.25	781.25
60	783.25	789.25
61	791.25	797.25
62	799.25	805.25
63	807.25	813.25
64	815.25	821.25
65	823.25	829.25
66	831.25	837.25
67	839.25	845.25
68	847.25	853.25
69	855.25	861.25

- Channels 21 to 60 used for DVB-T Digital TV broadcasting in the UK, with the exception of Channel 38, which is used for programme making and special events. Channels 61 to 69 used for 4G LTE.
- Channel 69 was not used for TV broadcasting in the UK, it was used by the MOD and until 2012 for programme making and special events.
- PAL I was withdrawn from broadcasting use in the UK during 2012 and 2013.

=== Western Europe, Greenland, most countries in Asia and Africa, and most of Oceania ===
System G/H 625 lines (8 MHz / channel)UHF band
Channel	Video carrier (MHz)	Audio carrier (MHz)
21	471.25	476.75
22	479.25	484.75
23	487.25	492.75
24	495.25	500.75
25	503.25	508.75
26	511.25	516.75
27	519.25	524.75
28	527.25	532.75
29	535.25	540.75
30	543.25	548.75
31	551.25	556.75
32	559.25	564.75
33	567.25	572.75
34	575.25	580.75
35	583.25	588.75
36	591.25	596.75
37	599.25	604.75
38	607.25	612.75
39	615.25	620.75
40	623.25	628.75
41	631.25	636.75
42	639.25	644.75
43	647.25	652.75
44	655.25	660.75
45	663.25	668.75
46	671.25	676.75
47	679.25	684.75
48	687.25	692.75
49	695.25	700.75
50	703.25	708.75
51	711.25	716.75
52	719.25	724.75
53	727.25	732.75
54	735.25	740.75
55	743.25	748.75
56	751.25	756.75
57	759.25	764.75
58	767.25	772.75
59	775.25	780.75
60	783.25	788.75
61	791.25	796.75
62	799.25	804.75
63	807.25	812.75
64	815.25	820.75
65	823.25	828.75
66	831.25	836.75
67	839.25	844.75
68	847.25	852.75
69	855.25	860.75
70	863.25	868.75
71	871.25	876.75
72	879.25	884.75
73	887.25	892.75
74	895.25	900.75
75	903.25	908.75
76	911.25	916.75
77	919.25	924.75
78	927.25	932.75
79	935.25	940.75
80	943.25	948.75
81	951.25	956.75

- Former channels 14 to 18 renumbered as 21 to 25 in 1961.
- Channels 70 to 81 no longer allocated to television. They were only used in Italy.

=== France, Eastern Europe, Former Soviet Union, French overseas territories and former French colonies in Africa, North Korea, Vietnam ===
System K 625 lines System L 625 lines
Channel	Video carrier (MHz)	Audio carrier (MHz)
21	471.25	477.75
22	479.25	485.75
23	487.25	493.75
24	495.25	501.75
25	503.25	509.75
26	511.25	517.75
27	519.25	525.75
28	527.25	533.75
29	535.25	541.75
30	543.25	549.75
31	551.25	557.75
32	559.25	565.75
33	567.25	573.75
34	575.25	581.75
35	583.25	589.75
36	591.25	597.75
37	599.25	605.75
38	607.25	613.75
39	615.25	621.75
40	623.25	629.75
41	631.25	637.75
42	639.25	645.75
43	647.25	653.75
44	655.25	661.75
45	663.25	669.75
46	671.25	677.75
47	679.25	685.75
48	687.25	693.75
49	695.25	701.75
50	703.25	709.75
51	711.25	717.75
52	719.25	725.75
53	727.25	733.75
54	735.25	741.75
55	743.25	749.75
56	751.25	757.75
57	759.25	765.75
58	767.25	773.75
59	775.25	781.75
60	783.25	789.75
61	791.25	797.75
62	799.25	805.75
63	807.25	813.75
64	815.25	821.75
65	823.25	829.75
66	831.25	837.75
67	839.25	845.75
68	847.25	853.75
69	855.25	861.75

- Some cable television providers in Vietnam may use System G.

=== DVB-T/DVB-T2/DTMB/ISDB-T Digital television frequencies (Western Europe, Eastern Europe most countries Asia, Africa and Oceania) ===
Ch	Center frequency (MHz)
21	474
22	482
23	490
24	498
25	506
26	514
27	522
28	530
29	538
30	546
31	554
32	562
33	570
34	578
35	586
36	594
37	602
38	610
39	618
40	626
41	634
42	642
43	650
44	658
45	666
46	674
47	682
48	690
49	698
50	706
51	714
52	722
53	730
54	738
55	746
56	754
57	762
58	770
59	778
60	786
61	794
62	802
63	810
64	818
65	826
66	834
67	842
68	850
69	858

=== Australia ===
System B 625 lines
Channel	Video carrier (MHz)	DVB-T (MHz)	Audio carrier (MHz)
28	527.25	529.5	532.75
29	534.25	536.5	539.75
30	541.25	543.5	546.75
31	548.25	550.5	553.75
32	555.25	557.5	560.75
33	562.25	564.5	567.75
34	569.25	571.5	574.75
35	576.25	578.5	581.75
36	583.25	585.5	588.75
37	590.25	592.5	595.75
38	597.25	599.5	602.75
39	604.25	606.5	609.75
40	611.25	613.5	616.75
41	618.25	620.5	623.75
42	625.25	627.5	630.75
43	632.25	634.5	637.75
44	639.25	641.5	644.75
45	646.25	648.5	651.75
46	653.25	655.5	658.75
47	660.25	662.5	665.75
48	667.25	669.5	672.75
49	674.25	676.5	679.75
50	681.25	683.5	686.75
51	688.25	690.5	693.75
52	695.25	697.5	700.75
53	702.25	704.5	707.75
54	709.25	711.5	714.75
55	716.25	718.5	721.75
56	723.25	725.5	728.75
57	730.25	732.5	735.75
58	737.25	739.5	742.75
59	744.25	746.5	749.75
60	751.25	753.5	756.75
61	758.25	755.5	763.75
62	765.25	767.5	770.75
63	772.25	774.5	777.75
64	779.25	781.5	784.75
65	786.25	788.5	791.75
66	793.25	795.5	798.75
67	800.25	802.5	805.75
68	807.25	809.5	812.75
69	814.25	816.5	819.75

Channels 52–69 had been progressively phased out since the introduction of digital television and rationalisation of the spectrum

=== Mainland China ===
Provisional assignments in 1970s System K 625 lines
Channel	Video carrier (MHz)	Audio carrier (MHz)
13	471.25	477.75
14	479.25	485.75
15	487.25	493.75
16	495.25	501.75
17	503.25	509.75
18	511.25	517.75
19	519.25	525.75
20	527.25	533.75
21	535.25	541.75
22	543.25	549.75
23	551.25	557.75
24	559.25	565.75
25	605.25	611.75
26	613.25	619.75
27	621.25	627.75
28	629.25	635.75
29	637.25	643.75
30	645.25	651.75
31	653.25	659.75
32	661.25	667.75
33	669.25	675.75
34	677.25	683.75
35	685.25	691.75
36	693.25	699.75
37	701.25	707.75
38	709.25	715.75
39	717.25	723.75
40	725.25	731.75
41	733.25	739.75
42	741.25	747.75
43	749.25	755.75
44	757.25	763.75
45	765.25	771.75
46	773.25	779.75
47	781.25	787.75
48	789.25	795.75

New assignments since late 1970sSystem K 625 lines
Channel	Video carrier (MHz)	DTMB/CMMB (MHz)	Audio carrier (MHz)
DS-13	471.25	474	477.75
DS-14	479.25	482	485.75
DS-15	487.25	490	493.75
DS-16	495.25	498	501.75
DS-17	503.25	506	509.75
DS-18	511.25	514	517.75
DS-19	519.25	522	525.75
DS-20	527.25	530	533.75
DS-21	535.25	538	541.75
DS-22	543.25	546	549.75
DS-23	551.25	554	557.75
DS-24	559.25	562	565.75
DS-25	607.25	610	613.75
DS-26	615.25	618	621.75
DS-27	623.25	626	629.75
DS-28	631.25	634	637.75
DS-29	639.25	642	645.75
DS-30	647.25	650	653.75
DS-31	655.25	658	661.75
DS-32	663.25	666	669.75
DS-33	671.25	674	677.75
DS-34	679.25	682	685.75
DS-35	687.25	690	693.75
DS-36	695.25	698	701.75
DS-37	703.25	706	709.75
DS-38	711.25	714	717.75
DS-39	719.25	722	725.75
DS-40	727.25	730	733.75
DS-41	735.25	738	741.75
DS-42	743.25	746	749.75
DS-43	751.25	754	757.75
DS-44	759.25	762	765.75
DS-45	767.25	770	773.75
DS-46	775.25	778	781.75
DS-47	783.25	786	789.75
DS-48	791.25	794	797.75
DS-49	799.25	802	805.75
DS-50	807.25	810	813.75
DS-51	815.25	818	821.75
DS-52	823.25	826	829.75
DS-53	831.25	834	837.75
DS-54	839.25	842	845.75
DS-55	847.25	850	853.75
DS-56	855.25	858	861.75
DS-57	863.25	866	869.75
DS-58	871.25	874	877.75
DS-59	879.25	882	885.75
DS-60	887.25	890	893.75
DS-61	895.25	898	901.75
DS-62	903.25	906	909.75
DS-63	911.25	914	917.75
DS-64	919.25	922	925.75
DS-65	927.25	930	933.75
DS-66	935.25	938	941.75
DS-67	943.25	946	949.75
DS-68	951.25	954	957.75

== See also ==
- Asian television frequencies
- Australasian television frequencies
- Autoroll
- Broadcast television systems
  - ATSC
  - DVB-T
  - DVB-T2
  - NTSC
  - NTSC-J
  - PAL
  - RCA
  - SECAM
- Digital television transition
- Knife-edge effect
- Multichannel television sound
- Pan-American television frequencies
