= Cora Randall =

Atmospheric scientist

- Born: Cora Marie Einterz
- Education: University of California Santa Cruz
- Scientific career
- Workplaces: University of Colorado Boulder
- Thesis: Nanosecond transient circular dichroism and birefringence measurements with applications to the photolysis of heme proteins (1985)

Cora Einterz Randall is an atmospheric scientist known for her research on particles in the atmosphere, particularly in polar regions.

== Education and career ==
Randall has a B.A. in Chemistry from State University of New York at Purchase (1982). She earned an M.S. (1983) and a Ph.D. in Chemistry from the University of California Santa Cruz (1985). She then conducted research at University of California Santa Cruz and Carnegie Mellon University before joining University of Colorado Boulder in 1989 as a Research Scientist; in 2010 she became a professor in the Department of Atmospheric and Oceanic Sciences.

== Research ==
In her early research at the University of Colorado Boulder, Randall relied on the Hubble Space Telescope and included investigations on the separation of the tail of Halley's Comet from its main body. Her research on the optics of proteins defined the characteristics of different forms of bathorhodopsin, which are formed after rhodopsin absorbs light.

Randall's current work centers on examining particles found in the atmosphere. Randall tracks gravity waves in the atmosphere using the data from the National Aeronautics and Space Agency's Aeronomy of Ice in the Mesophere (AIM) mission. She has used satellites to measure ozone concentrations from space and described the first measurements of satellite-based measurements of nitrogen dioxide in the atmosphere. This research led to her work connecting increases in nitrogen oxides with the loss of atmospheric ozone. Randall has further quantified the role of energetic particle precipitation on the concentrations of nitrogen oxides in the atmosphere above the southern hemisphere and the Arctic. Through climate modeling, Randall has examined the impact of the solar cycle on the Earth's climate.

=== Select publications ===
- Kliger, David S. (1990). Polarized light in optics and spectroscopy. James W. Lewis, Cora Einterz Randall. Boston: Academic Press. ISBN 0-12-414975-8. OCLC 20259064.
- Randall, C. E.; Harvey, V. L.; Manney, G. L.; Orsolini, Y.; Codrescu, M.; Sioris, C.; Brohede, S.; Haley, C. S.; Gordley, L. L.; Zawodny, J. M.; Russell, J. M. (2005). "Stratospheric effects of energetic particle precipitation in 2003–2004". Geophysical Research Letters. 32 (5). Bibcode:2005GeoRL..32.5802R. doi:10.1029/2004GL022003. ISSN 1944-8007.
- Randall, C. E.; Harvey, V. L.; Singleton, C. S.; Bailey, S. M.; Bernath, P. F.; Codrescu, M.; Nakajima, H.; Russell, J. M. (2007). "Energetic particle precipitation effects on the Southern Hemisphere stratosphere in 1992–2005". Journal of Geophysical Research: Atmospheres. 112 (D8). Bibcode:2007JGRD..112.8308R. doi:10.1029/2006JD007696. ISSN 2156-2202.
- Hug, Stephan J.; Lewis, James W.; Einterz, Cora M.; Thorgeirsson, Thorgeir E.; Kliger, David S. (1990). "Nanosecond photolysis of rhodopsin: evidence for a new blue-shifted intermediate". Biochemistry. 29 (6): 1475–1485. doi:10.1021/bi00458a019. ISSN 0006-2960. PMID 2334708.

== Awards and honors ==
- Provost's Faculty Achievement Award for Pre-Tenure Faculty, Academic Affairs (2008)
- Fellow, American Geophysical Union (2012)
- Fellow, American Association for the Advancement of Science (2015)
- Excellence in Leadership and Service Award, University of Colorado Boulder (2017)
- Bowie Lecturer: Marcel Nicolet Lecture, American Geophysical Union (2019)
- Distinguished Alumni Award (2023)
