= Charged Aerosol Release Experiment =

NASA project concerning dust in space

The Charged Aerosol Release Experiment also known as CARE, is a project run by NASA which will use a rocket to release dust in the upper atmosphere to form a dusty plasma in space. The clouds thus generated are intended to simulate naturally occurring phenomena called noctilucent clouds, which are the highest clouds in the atmosphere. The CARE experiment is intended to create an artificial dust layer at the boundary of space in a controlled sense, in order to "allow scientists to study different aspects of it, the turbulence generated on the inside, the distribution of dust particles and such."

The dust cloud is generated using the Nihka motor dust generator. The dust cloud is composed of aluminum oxide, carbon monoxide, hydrogen chloride, water, and nitrogen, as well as smaller amounts of carbon dioxide, hydrogen, monatomic chlorine, and monatomic hydrogen.

According to NASA, Spatial Heterodyne Imager for Mesospheric Radicals (SHIMMER) instrument will track the CARE dust cloud for days or even months. The SHIMMER instrument has previously viewed natural noctilucent clouds for the past two years. The CARE will be the first space viewing of an artificial noctilucent cloud.

The rocket was set to launch between 7:30 and 7:57 EDT on Tuesday September 14, 2009, from NASA's Wallops Flight Facility in Virginia.

CARE II was a follow-on to the CARE I experiment. On September 16, 2015, CARE II launched on a Black Brant XI sounding rocket from Andoya, Norway. The experiment carried 37 rocket motors and multiple instruments to study the generation of plasma wave electric fields and ionospheric density disturbances by the injection of high-speed dust particles. While firing, the 37 rocket motors injected 66 kg of dust particles into the ionosphere. The primary sensors for the experiment were two ground-based SuperDARN CUTLASS radars that view the ocean north of Norway.

The CARE II experiment gained recognition from the Guinness World Records for firing the most rocket engines (44) in a single flight.

== See also ==
- Noctilucent cloud
