= Broadcast auxiliary service =

Radio frequency used by a radio or TV station

A broadcast auxiliary service (BAS) is any radio frequency system used by a radio station or TV station, which is not part of its direct broadcast to listeners or viewers. These are essentially internal-use backhaul channels not intended for actual reception by the public, but part of the airchain required to get those signals back to the broadcast studio from the field. usually to be integrated into a live production. In Europe this is more commonly called Programme making and special events (PMSE).

Examples include:

- studio/transmitter link (STL)
- transmitter/studio link (TSL)
- remote pickup unit (RPU)
- electronic news gathering (ENG)

Several of these bands exist, but the most frequently used band is the 2 GHz microwave BAS band for point-to-point transmission from mobile newsgathering units to mountaintop receivers.

Seven 12-MHz wide channels exist in the band. In North America, DVB-T, precisely the same modulation technique as European Broadcast, is used, using a constellation of QPSK, 16QAM, or 64QAM, enabling sufficient digital bandwidths at 6 MHz deviation for transmission of an MPEG transport stream at 10 or more megabits per second, producing three "lower", "center", and "upper" overlapping 6 MHz channels within each 12 MHz channel.

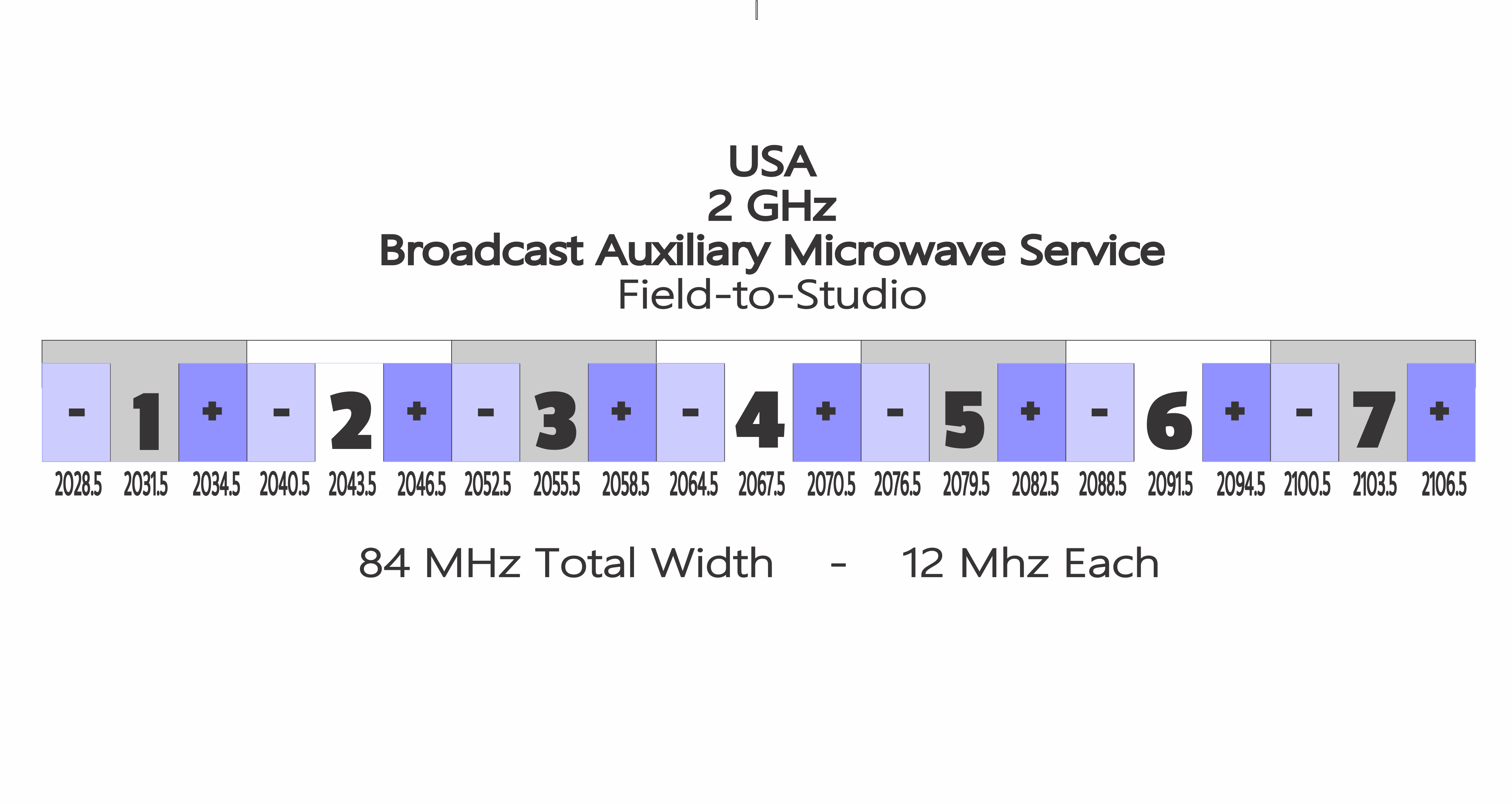
2GHz FCC Band Plan with 6MHz Subdivisions

== 2 GHz relocation ==
In the United States between 2005 and 2010, the Federal Communications Commission (FCC) moved TV channels in the 2 GHz TV BAS band at the request of Sprint Nextel, so that it could use a portion which was adjacent to PCS frequencies it already uses. The report and order resulting from this rulemaking specified that Sprint/Nextel must pay for every TV station using the band to buy and install new BAS equipment to work in the new band structure.

Previously, there had been seven analog TV channels, each 17 or 18 MHz wide, between 1990 and 2110 MHz. The new allocation created seven digital TV channels, each 12 MHz wide, from 2025.5 to 2109.5 MHz. (There was also a "narrowed in place" bandplan used as an interim measure, as the two bands overlap.)
Begun in 2005, the relocation was 94% complete as of October 2008, and was expected to be fully complete in mid 2009. After multiple extensions granted by the FCC, it was finally done in July 2010, with the completion of the Anchorage, Alaska TV market.

The cleared band is now used for PCS, AWS, and MSS services, including mobile broadband.
