= Aeronomy of Ice in the Mesosphere =

NASA satellite of the Explorer program

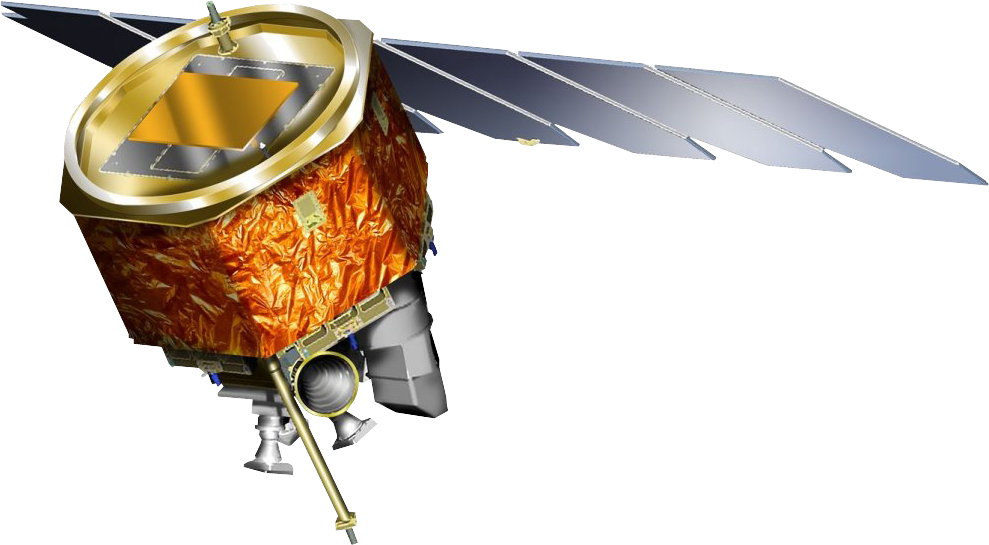
- AIM (Explorer 90) spacecraft
- Names: Explorer 90; AIM; SMEX
- Mission type: Atmospheric research
- Operator: NASA
- COSPAR ID: 2007-015A
- SATCAT no.: 31304
- Website: aim.hamptonu.edu
- Mission duration: 26 months (planned); 15 years and 11 months (final)

Spacecraft properties
- Spacecraft: Explorer XC
- Spacecraft type: Aeronomy of Ice in the Mesosphere
- Bus: LEOStar-2
- Manufacturer: Orbital Sciences Corporation
- Launch mass: 197 kg (434 lb)
- Dimensions: 1.4 × 1.1 m (4 ft 7 in × 3 ft 7 in)

Start of mission
- Launch date: 25 April 2007, 20:26:03 UTC
- Rocket: Pegasus-XL (F38)
- Launch site: Vandenberg, Stargazer; Runway 12/30
- Contractor: Orbital Sciences Corporation
- Entered service: 2007

End of mission
- Deactivated: March 13, 2023
- Decay date: August 19, 2024

Orbital parameters
- Reference system: Geocentric orbit
- Regime: Sun-synchronous orbit
- Perigee altitude: 552 km (343 mi)
- Apogee altitude: 559 km (347 mi)
- Inclination: 97.90°
- Period: 95.63 minutes

Instruments
- Cosmic Dust Experiment (CDE); Cloud Imaging and Particle Size (CIPS); Solar Occultation for Ice Experiment (SOFIE)

The Aeronomy of Ice in the Mesosphere (AIM or Explorer 90) was a NASA satellite launched in 2007 to conduct a planned 26-month study of noctilucent clouds (NLCs). It is the ninetieth Explorer program mission and is part of the NASA-funded Small Explorer program (SMEX).

In March 2023, NASA announced that battery power on the spacecraft had declined below the level needed to sustain operation. The spacecraft re-entered Earth's atmosphere in August 2024.

== Mission ==
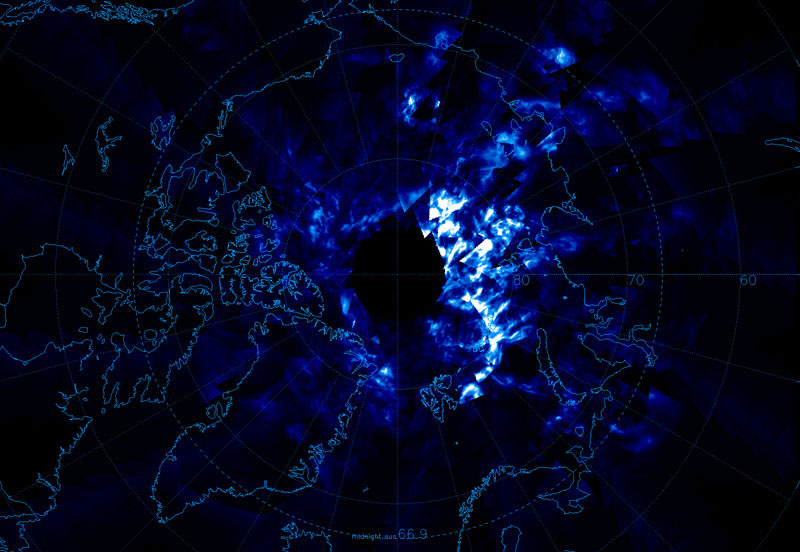
Noctilucent clouds as seen by AIM

The scientific purpose of the Aeronomy of Ice in the Mesosphere (AIM) mission is focused on the study of polar mesospheric clouds (PMCs) that form about 80 km (50 mi) above the surface of Earth in summer and mostly in the polar regions of Earth. The overall goal is to resolve why PMCs form and why they vary. AIM expected lifetime was at least two years. AIM measures PMCs and the thermal, chemical and dynamical environment in which they form. This will allow the connection to be made between these clouds and the meteorology of the polar mesospheric summer echoes. This connection is important because a significant variability in the yearly number of noctilucent ("glow in the dark") clouds (NLCs), one manifestation of PMCs, has been suggested as an indicator of global change. The body of data collected by AIM will provide the basis for a rigorous study of PMCs that can be reliably used to study past PMC changes, present trends and their relationship to global change. In the end, AIM will provide an expanded basis for the study of long-term variability in the climate of Earth. The AIM scientific objectives will be achieved by measuring near simultaneous PMC abundances, PMC spatial distributions, cloud particle size distributions, gravity wave activity, cosmic dust influx to the atmosphere needed to study the role of these particles as nucleation sites and precise, vertical profile measurements of temperature, H_{2}O, OH, CH_{4}, O_{3}, CO_{2}, NO, and aerosols. AIM carries three instruments: an infrared solar occultation differential absorption radiometer, built by the Space Dynamics Laboratory, Utah State University (Solar Occultation for Ice Experiment - SOFIE); a panoramic ultraviolet imager (Cloud Imaging and particle Size Experiment - CIPS); and, an in situ dust detector (Cosmic Dust Experiment - CDE), both designed and built by the Laboratory for Atmospheric and Space Physics, University of Colorado. Ball Aerospace & Technologies Corporation constructed the spacecraft bus and GATS, Inc., Newport News, Virginia, led the data management effort.

First seen in 1885, two years after the powerful eruption of the Indonesian volcano Krakatoa, scientists originally thought PMC's formed from the plumes of ash propelled into the sky during that eruption. But the clouds have persisted long after the effects of Krakatoa were felt. These days, some scientists think they are caused by space dust, while others believe that modern-day PMC's are indicators of changing climate of Earth. One thing is for certain: PMC's are shaped by the meteorology of the mesosphere, which does appear to be changing.

== Spacecraft ==
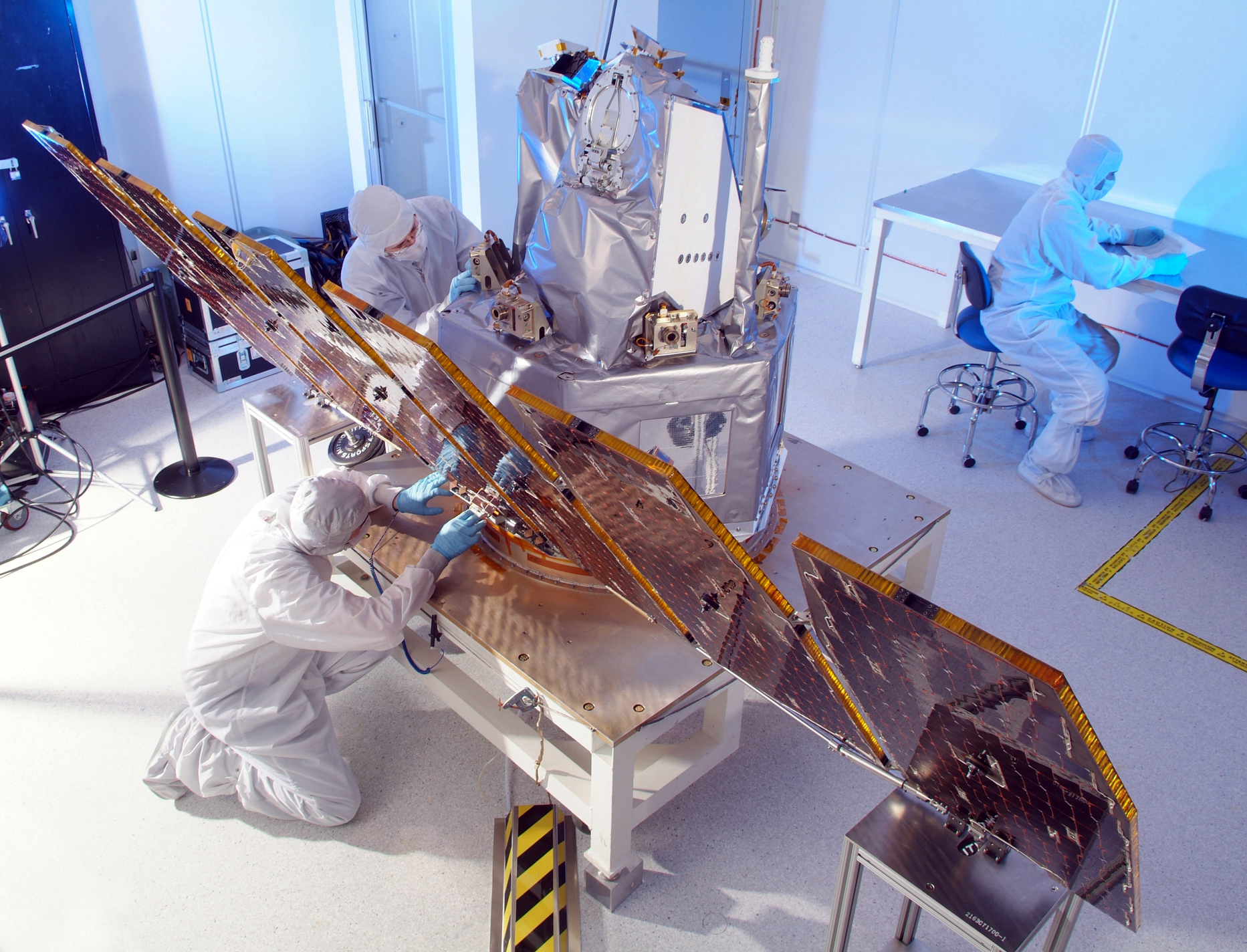
AIM in clean room

The AIM satellite is a 197 kg (434 lb), 1.4 × 1.1 m (4 ft 7 in × 3 ft 7 in) spacecraft, powered by two solar panels, carrying three instruments:

== Instruments ==
Illustration	Instrument Name	Abbr.	Description and scientific objective
	Cosmic Dust Experiment	CDE	The instrument records impacts from cosmic dust particles as they enter Earth's upper atmosphere. The instrument uses fourteen polyvinylidene fluoride detectors, which emit a pulse of charge when impacted by a hypervelocity dust particle (velocity 1 km/s (0.62 mi/s)). A measurement of the value and variability of the cosmic dust input will allow scientists to determine the role the particles have in PMC (Polar Mesospheric Cloud) formation. CDE is a nearly identical replica to the Student Dust Counter on the New Horizons mission.
	Cloud Imaging and Particle Size	CIPS	The instrument has four cameras positioned at different angles, which provide multiple views of the clouds from different angles and will allow a determination of the sizes of the ice particles that make up the cloud, and can be used to infer gravity waves in the atmosphere.
	Solar Occultation for Ice Experiment	SOFIE	The SOFIE uses solar occultation to measure cloud particles, temperature and atmospheric gases involved in forming the clouds. The instrument will reveal the mixture of chemicals that prompt NLC's formation, as well as the environment in which the clouds form.

== Launch ==
On 25 April 2007, AIM was launched into a circular 550 km (340 mi) Sun-synchronous orbit by a Pegasus-XL launch vehicle, which was air-launched from the Lockheed L-1011 Stargazer aircraft operated by Orbital Sciences Corporation (OSC).

== See also ==
- Aeronomy
- Explorer program
