= Aeronomy =

Science of the upper region of the Earth's or other planetary atmospheres

Aeronomy is the scientific study of the upper atmosphere of the Earth and corresponding regions of the atmospheres of other planets. It is a branch of both atmospheric chemistry and atmospheric physics. Scientists specializing in aeronomy, known as aeronomers, study the motions and chemical composition and properties of the Earth's upper atmosphere and regions of the atmospheres of other planets that correspond to it, as well as the interaction between upper atmospheres and the space environment. In atmospheric regions aeronomers study, chemical dissociation and ionization are important phenomena.

== History ==
The mathematician Sydney Chapman introduced the term aeronomy to describe the study of the Earth's upper atmosphere in 1946 in a letter to the editor of Nature entitled "Some Thoughts on Nomenclature." The term became official in 1954 when the International Union of Geodesy and Geophysics adopted it. "Aeronomy" later also began to refer to the study of the corresponding regions of the atmospheres of other planets.

== Branches ==
Aeronomy can be divided into three main branches: terrestrial aeronomy, planetary aeronomy, and comparative aeronomy.

=== Terrestrial aeronomy ===
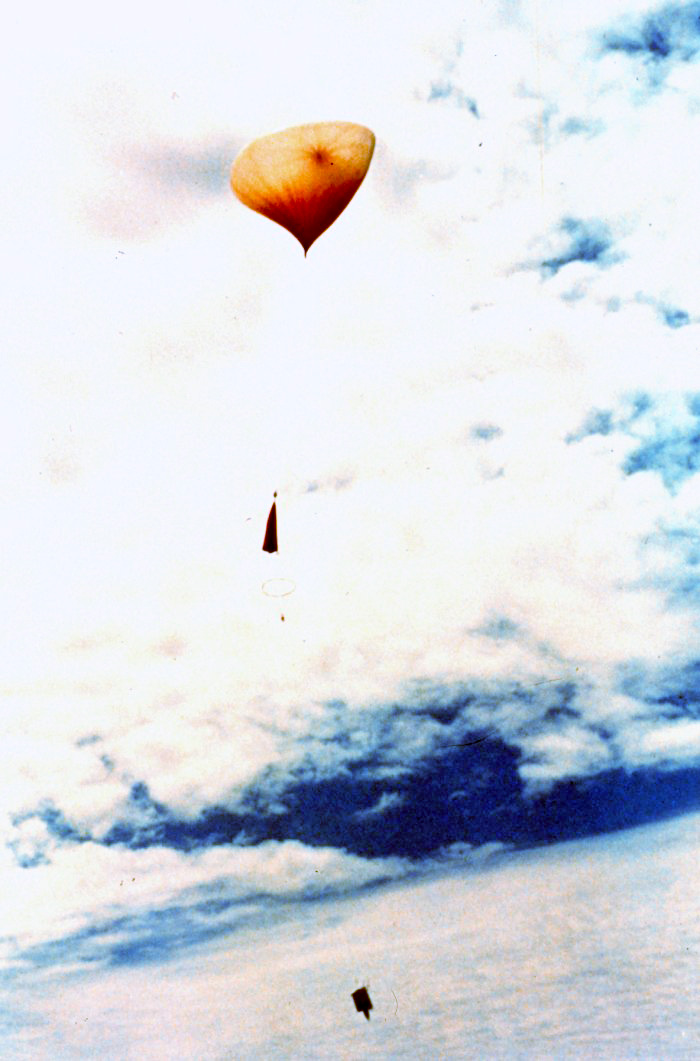
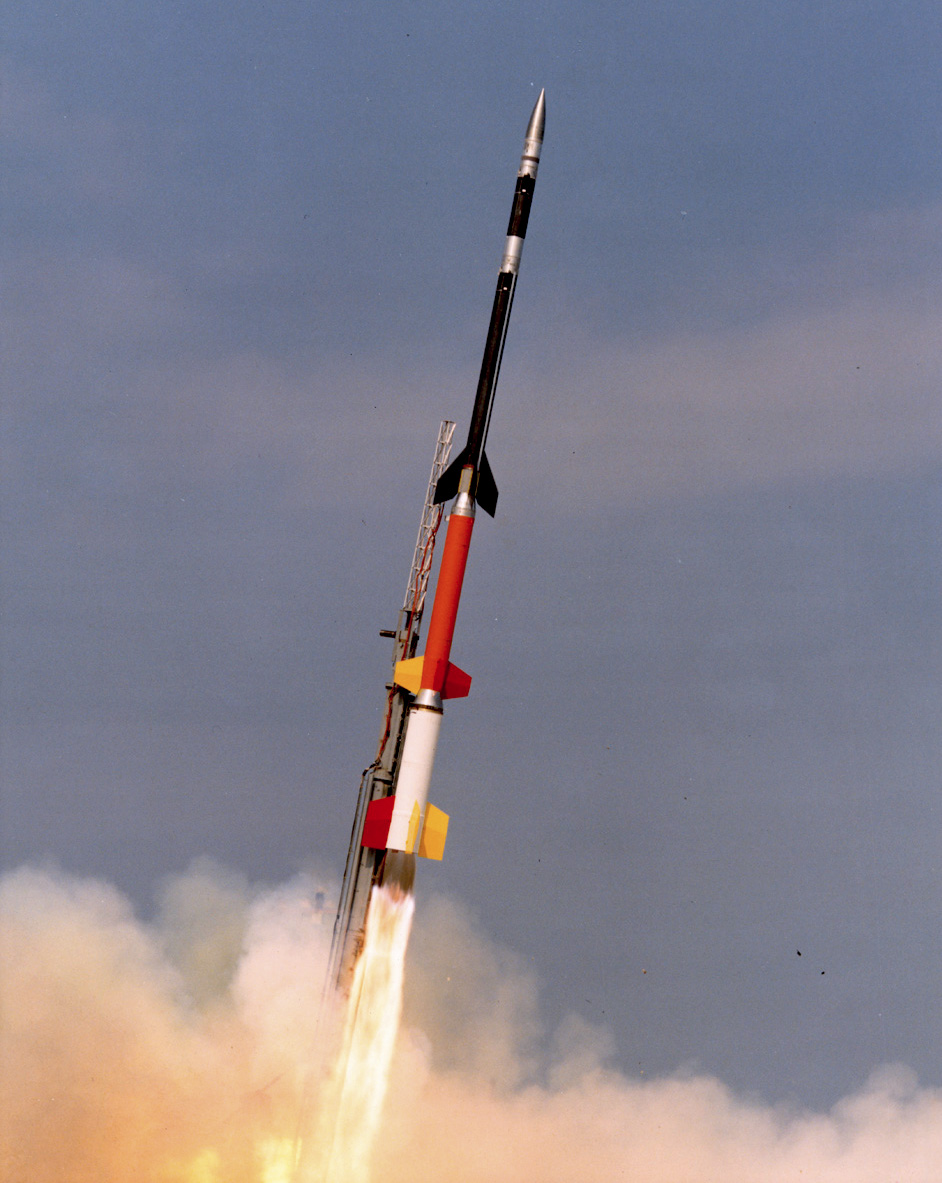
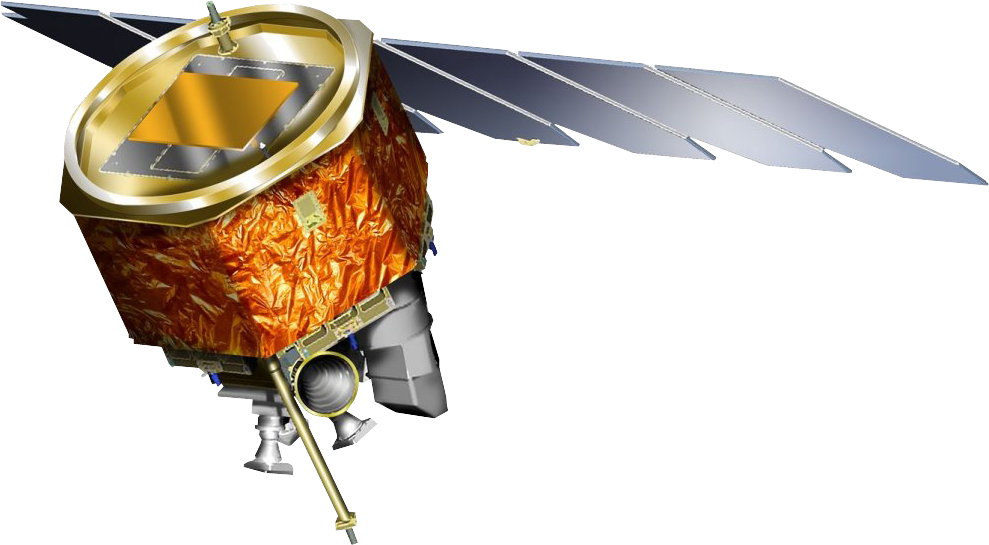
Balloons (left) and sounding rockets (center) are among the tools aeronomers use to gather data on the Earth's upper atmosphere. At right, a model of the Aeronomy of Ice in the Mesosphere (AIM) satellite, launched in 2007 to gather data on noctilucent clouds and polar mesospheric clouds in Earth's atmosphere.

An animation of atmospheric tide data gathered by the TIMED satellite in September 2005.

Terrestrial aeronomy focuses on the Earth's upper atmosphere, which extends from the stratopause to the atmosphere's boundary with outer space and is defined as consisting of the mesosphere, thermosphere, and exosphere and their ionized component, the ionosphere. Terrestrial aeronomy contrasts with meteorology, which is the scientific study of the Earth's lower atmosphere, defined as the troposphere and stratosphere. (Note: An alternative definition divides the atmosphere into three rather than two parts, with the "upper atmosphere" limited to the exosphere and thermosphere, the mesosphere and stratosphere making up the "middle atmosphere," and the "lower atmosphere" consisting only of the troposphere. Use of this definition does not change the focus of aeronomy, which is all of the Earth's atmosphere above the stratopause, or of meteorology, which is all of the Earth's atmosphere below the stratopause.) Although terrestrial aeronomy and meteorology once were completely separate fields of scientific study, cooperation between terrestrial aeronomers and meteorologists has grown as discoveries made since the early 1990s have demonstrated that the upper and lower atmospheres have an impact on one another's physics, chemistry, and biology.

Terrestrial aeronomers study atmospheric tides and upper-atmospheric lightning discharges such as red sprites, sprite halos, blue jets, and ELVES. They also investigate the causes of dissociation and ionization processes in the Earth's upper atmosphere. Terrestrial aeronomers use ground-based telescopes, balloons, satellites, and sounding rockets to gather data from the upper atmosphere.

==== Atmospheric tides ====
Atmospheric tides are global-scale periodic oscillations of the Earth′s atmosphere, analogous in many ways to ocean tides. Atmospheric tides dominate the dynamics of the mesosphere and lower thermosphere, serving as an important mechanism for transporting energy from the upper atmosphere into the lower atmosphere. Terrestrial aeronomers study atmospheric tides because an understanding of them is essential to an understanding of the atmosphere as a whole and of benefit in improving the understanding of meteorology. Modeling and observations of atmospheric tides allow researchers to monitor and predict changes in the Earth's atmosphere.

==== Upper-atmospheric lightning ====
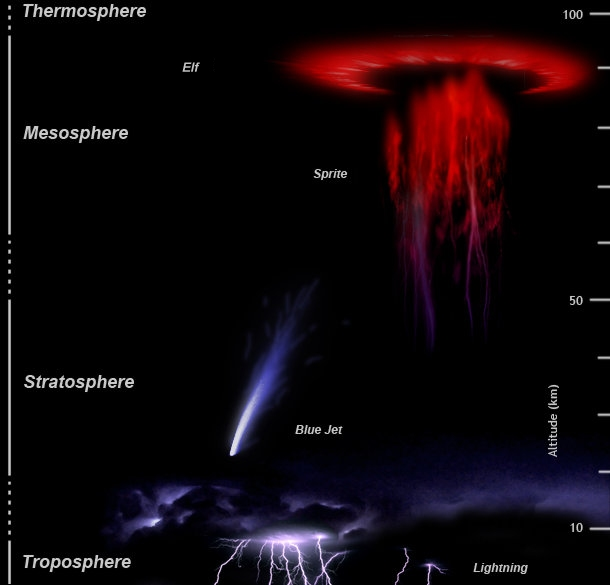
Representation of upper-atmospheric lightning and electrical-discharge phenomena

"Upper-atmospheric lightning" or "upper-atmospheric discharge" are terms aeronomers sometimes use to refer to a family of electrical-breakdown phenomena in the Earth's upper atmosphere that occur well above the altitudes of the tropospheric lightning observed in the lower atmosphere. Currently, the preferred term for an electrical-discharge phenomenon induced in the upper atmosphere by tropospheric lightning is "transient luminous event" (TLE). There are various types of TLEs including red sprites, sprite halos, blue jets, and ELVES (an acronym for "Emission of Light and Very-Low-Frequency perturbations due to Electromagnetic Pulse Sources").

=== Planetary aeronomy ===
Planetary aeronomy studies the regions of the atmospheres of other planets that correspond to the Earth's mesosphere, thermosphere, exosphere, and ionosphere. In some cases, a planet's entire atmosphere may consist only of what on Earth constitutes the upper atmosphere, or only a portion of it. Planetary aeronomers use ground-based telescopes, space telescopes, and space probes which fly by, orbit, or land on other planets to gain knowledge of the atmospheres of those planets through the use of instruments such as interferometers, optical spectrometers, magnetometers, and plasma detectors and techniques such as radio occultation. Although planetary aeronomy originally was confined to the study of the atmospheres of the other planets in the Solar System, the discovery since 1995 of exoplanets has allowed planetary aeronomers to expand their field to include the atmospheres of those planets as well.

=== Comparative aeronomy ===
Comparative aeronomy uses the findings of terrestrial and planetary aeronomy—traditionally separate scientific fields—to compare the characteristics and behaviors of the atmospheres of other planets with one another and with the upper atmosphere of Earth. It seeks to identify and describe the ways in which differing chemistry, magnetic fields, and thermodynamics on various planets affect the creation, evolution, diversity, and disappearance of atmospheres.

== See also ==
- Atmospheric chemistry
- Atmospheric physics
- Exosphere
- Ionosphere
- Mesosphere
- Meteorology
- Space physics
- Thermosphere
