= Noctilucent cloud =

NLCs Night Shining Clouds

Noctilucent clouds
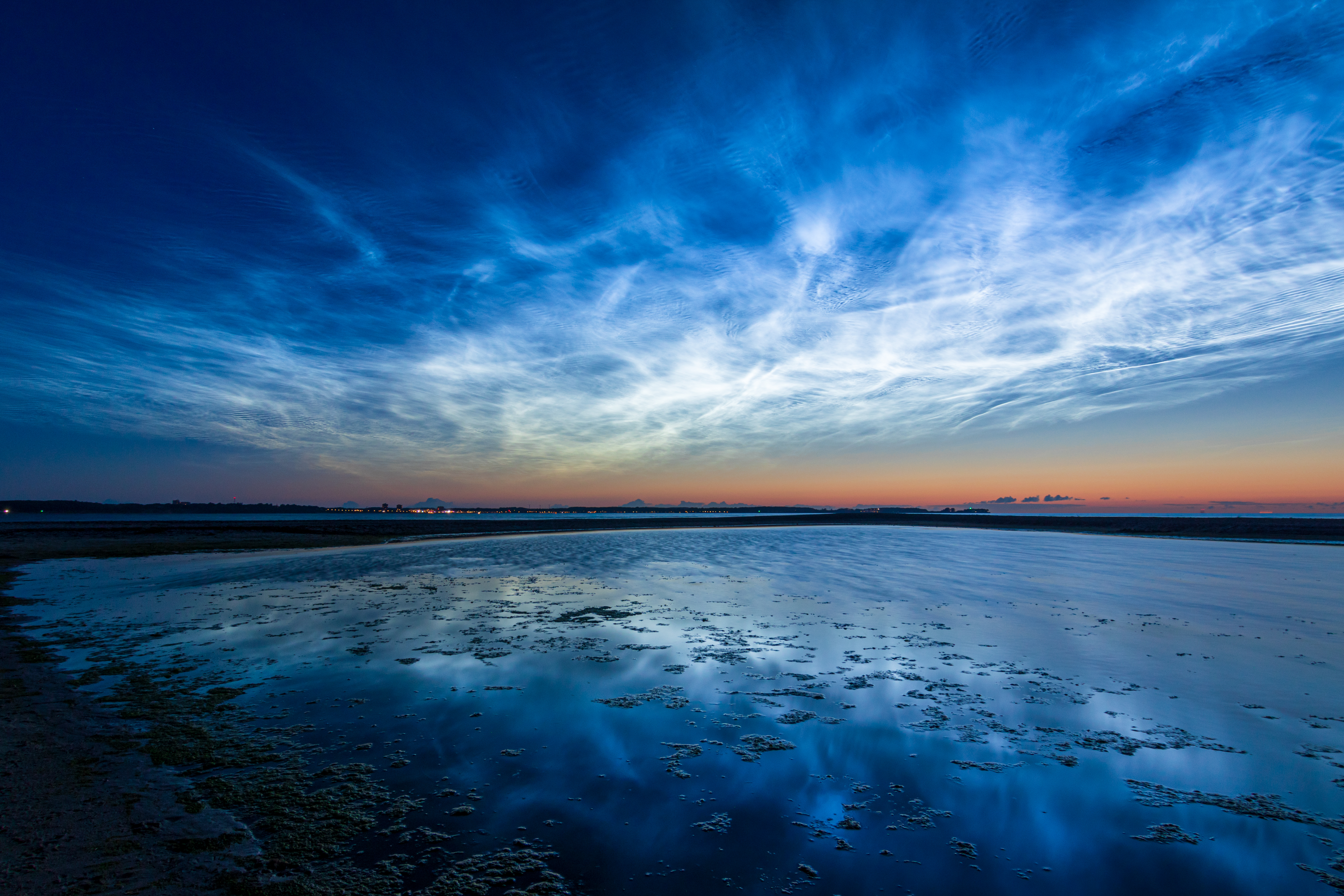
- Noctilucent clouds over Laboe, Germany
- Abbreviation: NLC/PMC
- Altitude: 76,000 to 85,000 m (250,000 to 280,000 ft)
- Classification: Other
- Precipitation: No

Noctilucent clouds (NLCs), or night shining clouds, are tenuous cloud-like phenomena in the upper atmosphere. When viewed from space, they are called polar mesospheric clouds (PMCs), detectable as a diffuse scattering layer of water ice crystals near the summer polar mesopause. They consist of ice crystals and from the ground are only visible during astronomical twilight. Noctilucent roughly means "night shining" in Latin. They are most often observed during the summer months from latitudes between ±50° and ±70°. Too faint to be seen in daylight, they are visible only when the observer and the lower layers of the atmosphere are in Earth's shadow while these very high clouds are still in sunlight. Recent studies suggest that increased atmospheric methane emissions produce additional water vapour through chemical reactions once the methane molecules reach the mesosphere – creating, or reinforcing existing, noctilucent clouds.

== General ==
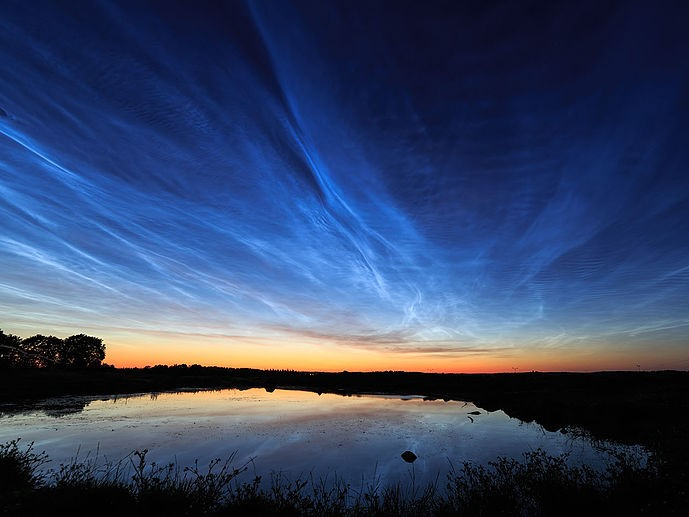
Noctilucent clouds over Uppsala, Sweden

No confirmed record of their observation exists before 1885, although they may have been observed a few decades earlier by Thomas Romney Robinson in Armagh.

== Formation ==
Noctilucent clouds are composed of tiny crystals of water ice up to 100 nm in diameter and exist at a height of about 76 to 85 km (249,000 to 279,000 ft), higher than any other clouds in Earth's atmosphere. Clouds in the Earth's lower atmosphere form when water collects on particles, but mesospheric clouds may form directly from water vapour in addition to forming on dust particles.

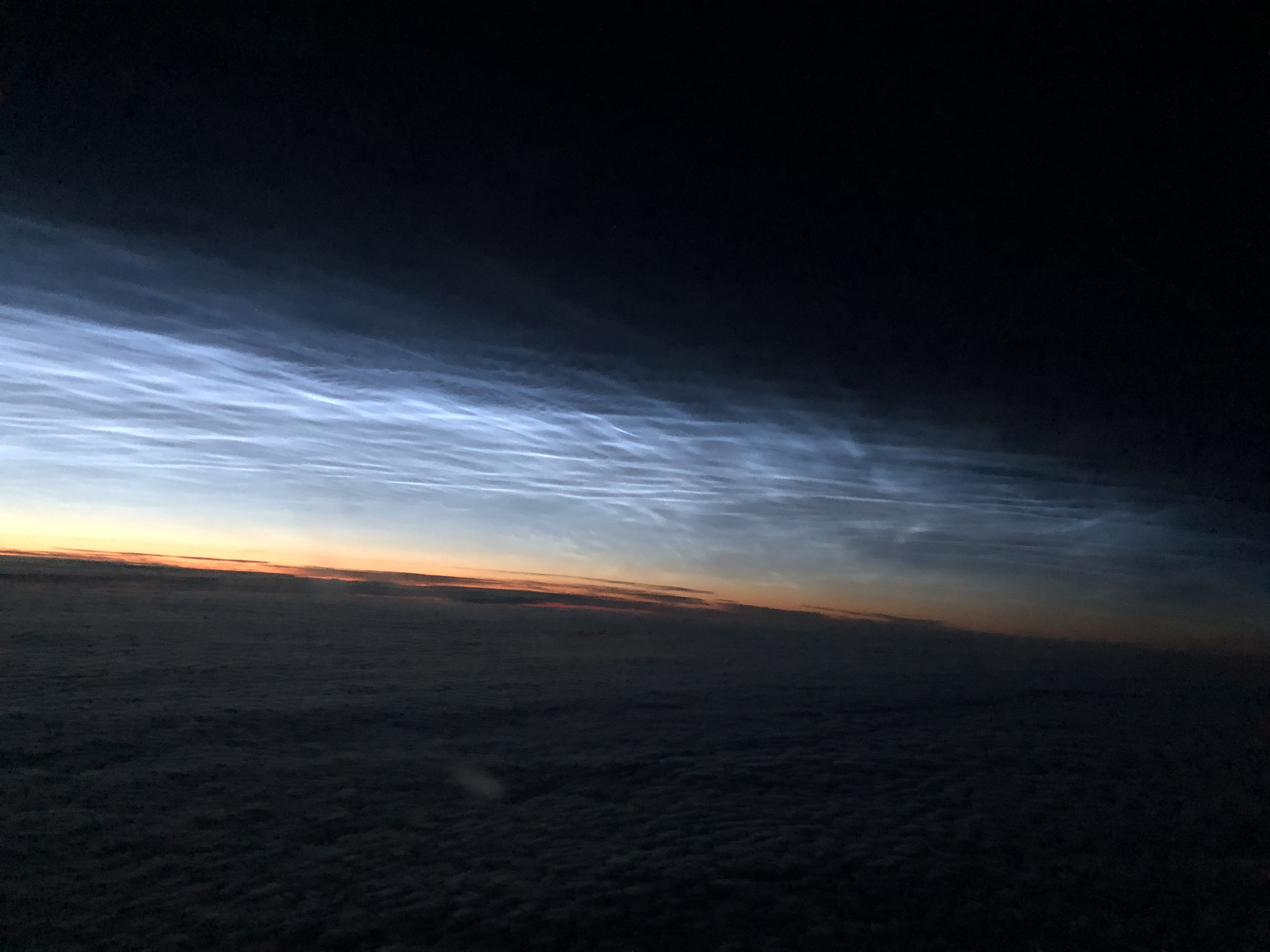
Noctilucent clouds during arctic dawn seen from high altitude

Data from the Aeronomy of Ice in the Mesosphere satellite suggests that noctilucent clouds require water vapour, dust, and very cold temperatures to form. The sources of both the dust and the water vapour in the upper atmosphere are not known with certainty. The dust is believed to come from micrometeors, although particulates from volcanoes and dust from the troposphere are also possibilities. The moisture could be lifted through gaps in the tropopause, as well as forming from the reaction of methane with hydroxyl radicals in the stratosphere.

The exhaust from Space Shuttles, in use between 1981 and 2011, which was almost entirely water vapour after the detachment of the Solid Rocket Booster at a height of about 46 km (151,000 ft), was found to generate minuscule individual clouds. About half of the vapour was released into the thermosphere, usually at altitudes of 103 to 114 km (338,000 to 374,000 ft). In August 2014, a SpaceX Falcon 9 also caused noctilucent clouds over Orlando, Florida after a launch.

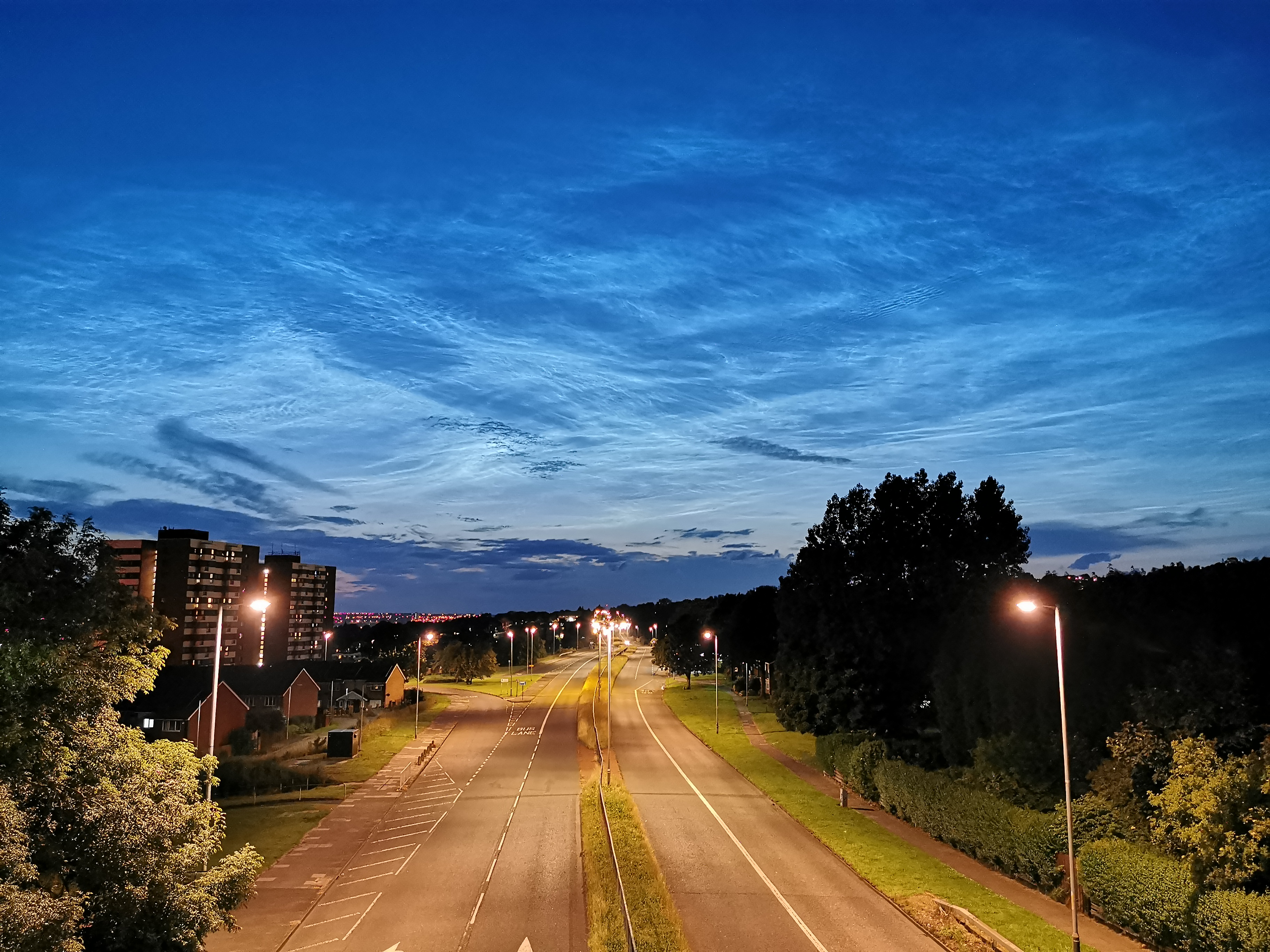
The A167 dual carriageway through Gateshead, with noctilucent clouds in the sky.

The exhaust can be transported to the Arctic region in little over a day, although the exact mechanism of this very high-speed transfer is unknown. As the water migrates northward, it falls from the thermosphere into the colder mesosphere, which occupies the region of the atmosphere just below. Although this mechanism is the cause of individual noctilucent clouds, it is not thought to be a major contributor to the phenomenon as a whole.

As the mesosphere contains very little moisture, approximately one hundred millionth that of air from the Sahara, and is extremely thin, the ice crystals can form only at temperatures below about −120 °C (−184 °F). This means that noctilucent clouds form predominantly during summer when, counterintuitively, the mesosphere is coldest as a result of seasonally varying vertical winds, leading to cold summertime conditions in the upper mesosphere (upwelling, resulting in adiabatic cooling) and wintertime heating (downwelling, resulting in adiabatic heating). Therefore, they cannot be observed (even if they are present) inside the Polar circles because the Sun is never low enough under the horizon at this season at these latitudes. Noctilucent clouds form mostly near the polar regions, because the mesosphere is coldest there. Clouds in the southern hemisphere are about 1 km (3,300 ft) higher than those in the northern hemisphere.

Ultraviolet radiation from the Sun breaks water molecules apart, reducing the amount of water available to form noctilucent clouds. The radiation is known to vary cyclically with the solar cycle and satellites have been tracking the decrease in brightness of the clouds with the increase of ultraviolet radiation for the last two solar cycles. It has been found that changes in the clouds follow changes in the intensity of ultraviolet rays by about a year, but the reason for this long lag is not yet known.

Noctilucent clouds are known to exhibit high radar reflectivity, in a frequency range of 50 MHz to 1.3 GHz. This behaviour is not well understood but a possible explanation is that the ice grains become coated with a thin metal film composed of sodium and iron, which makes the cloud far more reflective to radar, although this explanation remains controversial. Sodium and iron atoms are stripped from incoming micrometeors and settle into a layer just above the altitude of noctilucent clouds, and measurements have shown that these elements are severely depleted when the clouds are present. Other experiments have demonstrated that, at the extremely low temperatures of a noctilucent cloud, sodium vapour can rapidly be deposited onto an ice surface.

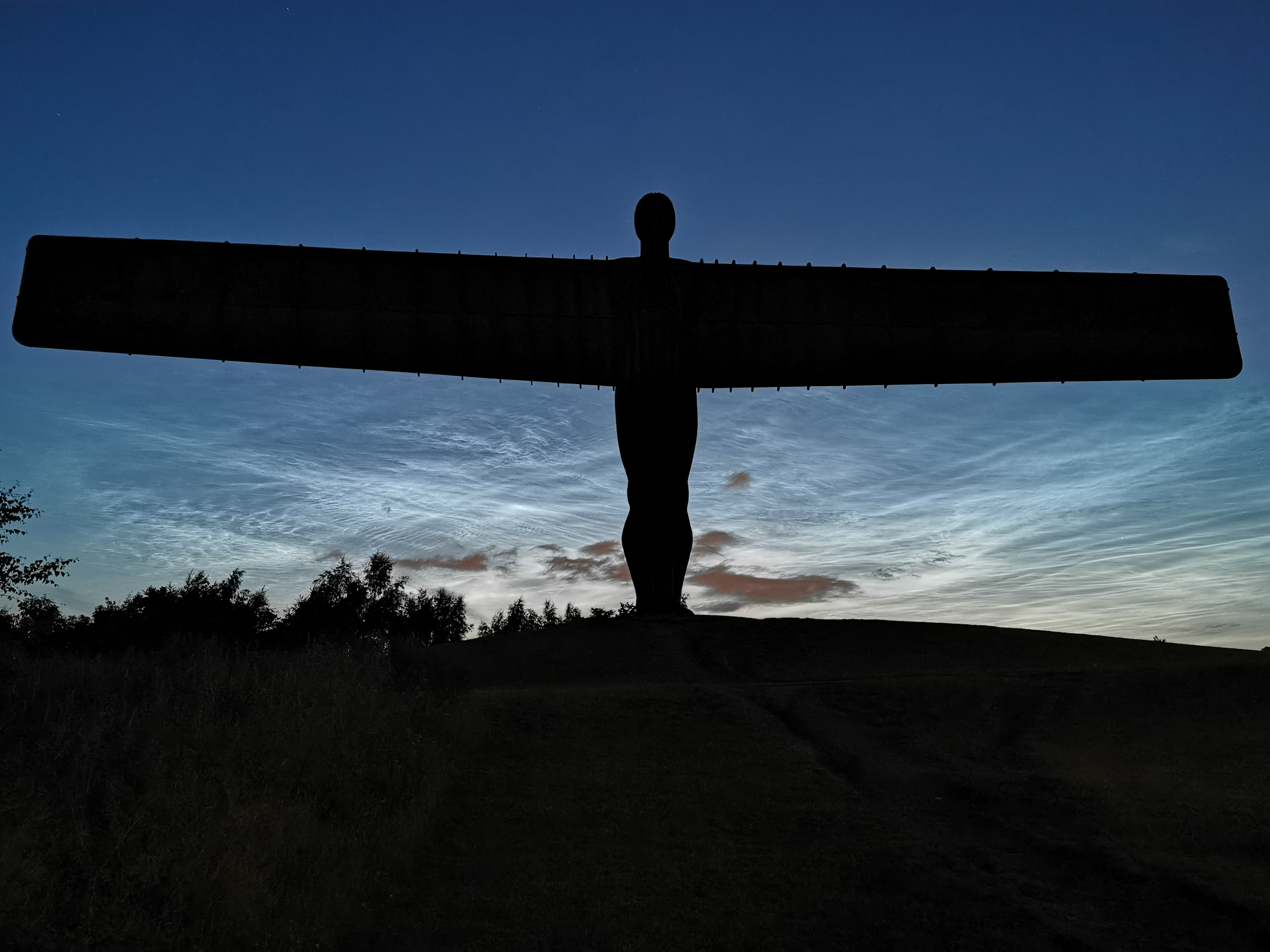
The Angel of the North with noctilucent clouds in the background

== Discovery and investigation ==
Noctilucent clouds are first known to have been observed in 1885, two years after the 1883 eruption of Krakatoa. It remains unclear whether their appearance had anything to do with the volcanic eruption or whether their discovery was due to more people observing the spectacular sunsets caused by the volcanic debris in the atmosphere. Studies have shown that noctilucent clouds are not caused solely by volcanic activity, although dust and water vapour could be injected into the upper atmosphere by eruptions and contribute to their formation. Scientists at the time assumed the clouds were another manifestation of volcanic ash, but after the ash had settled out of the atmosphere, the noctilucent clouds persisted. Finally, the theory that the clouds were composed of volcanic dust was disproved by Malzev in 1926. In the years following their discovery, the clouds were studied extensively by Otto Jesse of Germany, who was the first to photograph them, in 1887, and seems to have been the one to coin the term "noctilucent cloud". His notes provide evidence that noctilucent clouds first appeared in 1885. He had been doing detailed observations of the unusual sunsets caused by the Krakatoa eruption the previous year and firmly believed that, if the clouds had been visible then, he would undoubtedly have noticed them. Systematic photographic observations of the clouds were organized in 1887 by Jesse, Foerster, and Stolze and, after that year, continuous observations were carried out at the Berlin Observatory.

In the decades after Otto Jesse's death in 1901, there were few new insights into the nature of noctilucent clouds. Wegener's conjecture, that they were composed of water ice, was later shown to be correct. Study was limited to ground-based observations and scientists had very little knowledge of the mesosphere until the 1960s, when direct rocket measurements began. These showed for the first time that the clouds' occurrence coincided with very low temperatures in the mesosphere.

Noctilucent clouds were first detected from space by an instrument on the OGO-6 satellite in 1972. The OGO-6 observations of a bright scattering layer over the polar caps were identified as poleward extensions of these clouds. A later satellite, the Solar Mesosphere Explorer, mapped the distribution of the clouds between 1981 and 1986 with its ultraviolet spectrometer. The clouds were detected with Lidar in 1995 at Utah State University, even when they were not visible to the naked eye. The first physical confirmation that water ice is indeed the primary component of noctilucent clouds came from the HALOE instrument on the Upper Atmosphere Research Satellite in 2001.

In 2001, the Swedish Odin satellite performed spectral analyses on the clouds, and produced daily global maps that revealed large patterns in their distribution.

The AIM (Aeronomy of Ice in the Mesosphere) satellite was launched on 25 April 2007. It was the first satellite dedicated to studying noctilucent clouds, and made its first observations a month later (25 May). Images taken by the satellite show shapes in the clouds that are similar to shapes in tropospheric clouds, hinting at similarities in their dynamics.

In the previous year, scientists with the Mars Express mission had announced their discovery of carbon dioxide–crystal clouds on Mars that extended to 100 km (330,000 ft) above the planet's surface. These are the highest clouds discovered over the surface of a rocky planet. Like noctilucent clouds on Earth, they can be observed only when the Sun is below the horizon.

Research published in the journal Geophysical Research Letters in June 2009 suggests that noctilucent clouds observed following the Tunguska Event of 1908 are evidence that the impact was caused by a comet.

The United States Naval Research Laboratory (NRL) and the United States Department of Defense Space Test Program (STP) conducted the Charged Aerosol Release Experiment (CARE) on 19 September 2009, using exhaust particles from a Black Brant XII suborbital sounding rocket launched from NASA's Wallops Flight Facility to create an artificial noctilucent cloud. The cloud was to be observed over a period of weeks or months by ground instruments and the Spatial Heterodyne IMager for MEsospheric Radicals (SHIMMER) instrument on the NRL/STP STPSat-1 spacecraft. The rocket's exhaust plume was observed and reported to news organizations in the United States from New Jersey to Massachusetts.

A 2018 experiment briefly created noctilucent clouds over Alaska, allowing ground-based measurements and experiments aimed at verifying computer simulations of the phenomenon. A suborbital NASA rocket was launched on 26 January 2018 by University of Alaska professor Richard Collins. It carried water-filled canisters, which were released at about 53 mi (85 km) above the Earth. Since the naturally occurring clouds only appear in summer, this experiment was conducted in mid-winter to assure that its results would not be mixed with a natural event.

== Description from satellites ==
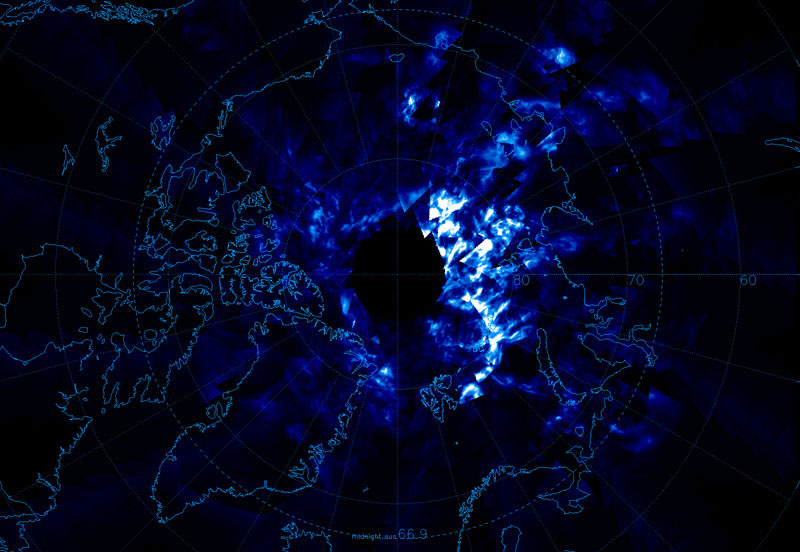
Polar mesospheric clouds over the north pole

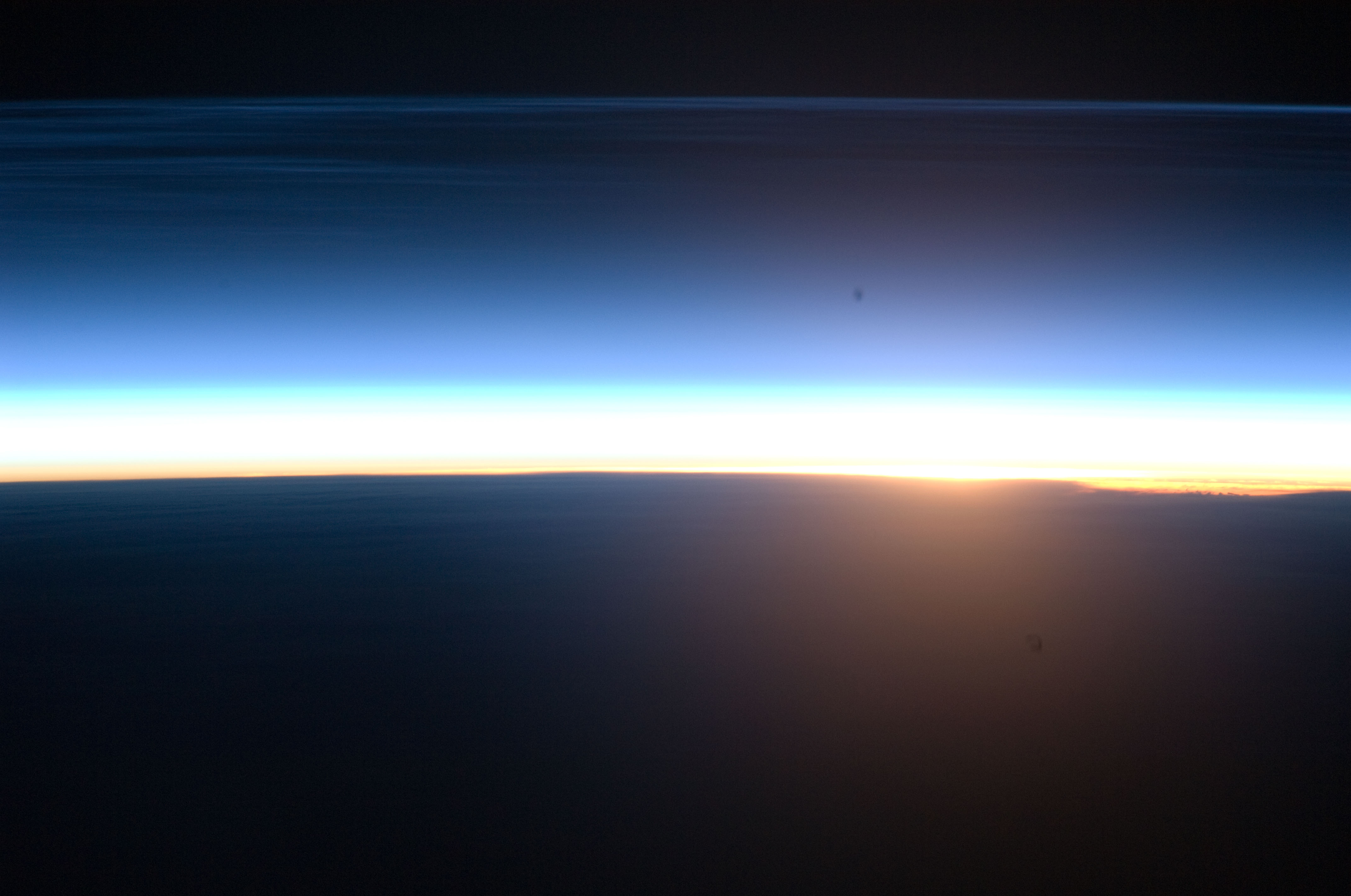
Polar mesospheric clouds illuminated by the rising Sun

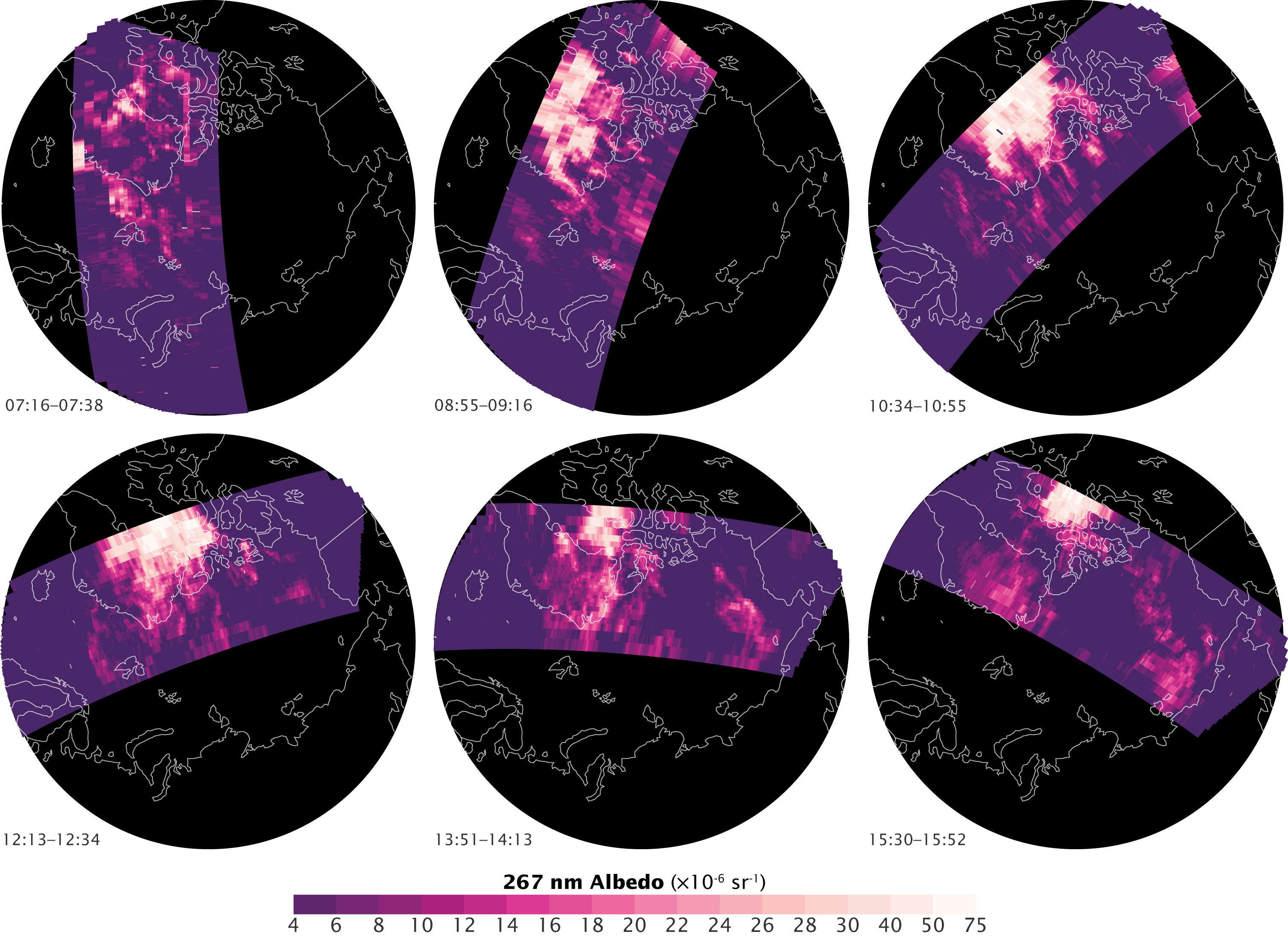
Images that show measurements of polar mesospheric clouds over the course of one day

PMC's have four major types based on physical structure and appearance. Type I veils are very tenuous and lack well-defined structure, somewhat like cirrostratus or poorly defined cirrus. Type II bands are long streaks that often occur in groups arranged roughly parallel to each other. They are usually more widely spaced than the bands or elements seen with cirrocumulus clouds. Type III billows are arrangements of closely spaced, roughly parallel short streaks that mostly resemble cirrus. Type IV whirls are partial or, more rarely, complete rings of cloud with dark centres.

Satellite observations allow the very coldest parts of the polar mesosphere to be observed, all the way to the geographic pole. In the early 1970s, visible airglow photometers first scanned the atmospheric horizon throughout the summer polar mesospause region. This experiment, which flew on the OGO-6 satellite, was the first to trace noctilucent-like cloud layers across the polar cap. The very bright scattering layer was seen in full daylight conditions, and was identified as the poleward extension of noctilucent clouds. In the early 1980s, the layer was observed again from a satellite, the Solar Mesospheric Explorer (SME). On board this satellite was an ultraviolet spectrometer, which mapped the distributions of clouds over the time period 1981 to 1986. The experiment measured the altitude profile of scattering from clouds at two spectral channels (primarily) 265 nm and 296 nm.

Polar mesospheric clouds generally increase in brightness and occurrence frequency with increasing latitude, from about 60° to the highest latitudes observed (85°). So far, no apparent dependence on longitude has been found, nor is there any evidence of a dependence on auroral activity.

On 8 July 2018, NASA launched a giant balloon from Esrange, Sweden which traveled through the stratosphere across the Arctic to Western Nunavut, Canada in five days. The giant balloon was equipped with cameras, which captured six million high-resolution images (120 terabytes). The project aim was to study the relationship between PMCs and the atmospheric gravity waves in the mesosphere that result from air being pushed up by mountain ranges. These images were intended to aid in studying turbulence in the atmosphere, leading to better weather forecasting.

NASA has also used the AIM satellite to study noctilucent clouds. Tomographic analyses of AIM satellite indicate that there is a spatial negative correlation between albedo and wave‐induced altitude.

== Observation ==
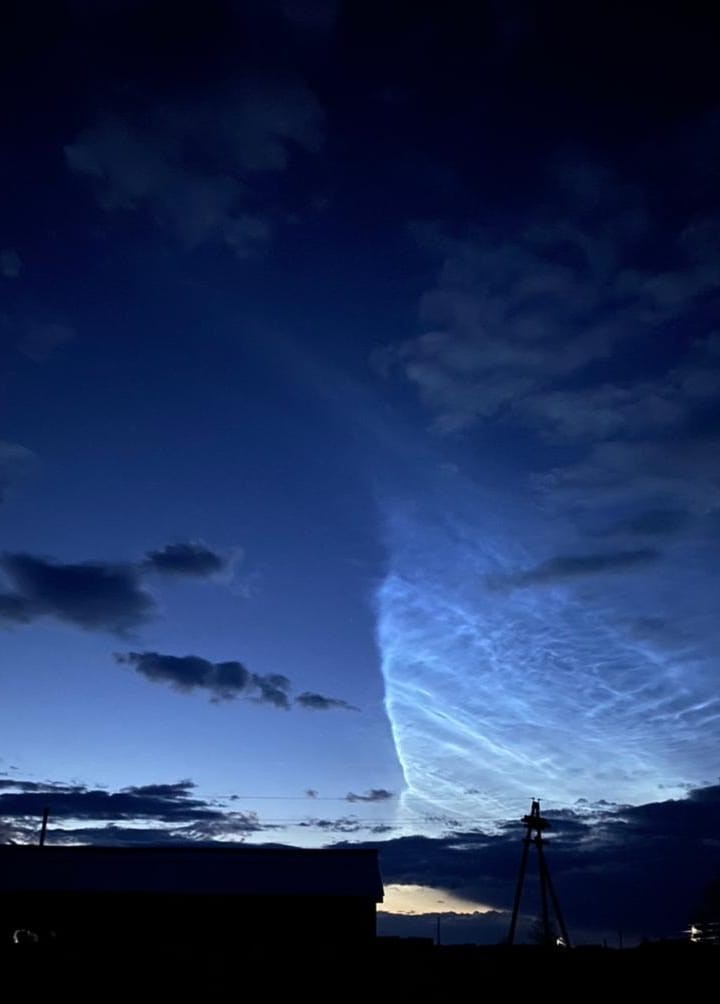
Noctilucent clouds in Buryatia, Russia

Noctilucent clouds are generally colourless or pale blue, although occasionally other colours including red and green have been observed. The characteristic blue colour comes from absorption by ozone in the path of the sunlight illuminating the noctilucent cloud. They can appear as featureless bands, but frequently show distinctive patterns such as streaks, wave-like undulations, and whirls. They are considered a "beautiful natural phenomenon". Noctilucent clouds may be confused with cirrus clouds, but appear sharper under magnification. Those caused by rocket exhausts tend to show colours other than silver or blue, because of iridescence caused by the uniform size of the water droplets produced.

Noctilucent clouds may be seen at latitudes of 50° to 65°. They seldom occur at lower latitudes (although there have been sightings as far south as Paris, Utah, Italy, Turkey and Spain), and closer to the poles it does not get dark enough for the clouds to become visible. They occur during summer, from mid-May to mid-August in the northern hemisphere and between mid-November and mid-February in the southern hemisphere. They are very faint and tenuous, and may be observed only in twilight around sunrise and sunset when the clouds of the lower atmosphere are in shadow, but the noctilucent cloud is illuminated by the Sun. They are best seen when the Sun is between 6° and 16° below the horizon. Although noctilucent clouds occur in both hemispheres, they have been observed thousands of times in the northern hemisphere, but fewer than 100 times in the southern. Southern hemisphere noctilucent clouds are fainter and occur less frequently; additionally the southern hemisphere has a lower population and less land area from which to make observations.

These clouds may be studied from the ground, from space, and directly by sounding rocket. Also, some noctilucent clouds are made of smaller crystals, 30 nm or less, which are invisible to observers on the ground because they do not scatter enough light.

== Forms ==
The clouds may show a large variety of different patterns and forms. An identification scheme was developed by Fogle in 1970 that classified five different forms. These classifications have since been modified and subdivided.

1. Type I veils are very tenuous and lack well-defined structure, somewhat like cirrostratus or poorly defined cirrus.
2. Type II bands are long streaks that often occur in roughly parallel groups, usually more widely spaced than the bands or elements seen with cirrocumulus clouds.
3. Type III billows are arrangements of closely spaced, roughly parallel short streaks that mostly resemble cirrus.
4. Type IV whirls are partial or, more rarely, complete rings of cloud with dark centres.

== See also ==
- Aeronomy
  - Aeronomy of Ice in the Mesosphere
- Cloud iridescence
- Polar stratospheric cloud
- Space jellyfish
- Twilight phenomenon

== General and cited references ==
- Gadsden, Michael; Parviainen, Pekka (1995). Observing Noctilucent Clouds (PDF). International Association of Geomagnetism & Aeronomy. ISBN 978-0-9650686-0-4. Archived from the original (PDF) on 31 October 2008.
- Schröder, Wilfried (November 2001). "Otto Jesse and the Investigation of Noctilucent Clouds 115 Years Ago" (PDF). Bulletin of the American Meteorological Society. 82 (11): 2457–2468. Bibcode:2001BAMS...82.2457S. doi:10.1175/1520-0477(2001)082<2457:OJATIO>2.3.CO;2.
