= Polar mesospheric summer echoes =

Polar mesospheric summer echoes (PMSE) is the phenomenon of anomalous radar echoes found between 80 and 90 km in altitude from May through early August in the Arctic, and from November through to February in the Antarctic. These strong radar echoes are associated with the extremely cold temperatures that occur above continental Antarctica during the summer. Rocket and radar measurements indicate that a partial reflection from a multitude of ion layers and constructive interference causes at least some of the PMSE.

Generally PMSE exhibits dramatic variations in height and intensity as well as large variations in Doppler shift. PMSE exhibit strong signal power enhancements of scattering cross section at VHF radar frequencies in the range 50 MHz to 250 MHz, at times even to over 1 GHz, that occur in summer at high latitudes. The peak PMSE height is slightly below the summer mesopause temperature minimum at 88 km, and above the noctilucent cloud (NLC) and/or polar mesospheric cloud (PMC) layer at 83–84 km. The usual instrument for observing PMSE is a VHF Mesosphere-Stratosphere-Troposphere (MST) radar, although LIDARs and sounding rockets have also been used.

PMSE is believed to be caused by structural irregularities in the ionospheric electron density at lower altitudes. The exact cause of PMSE is not yet known, although theorists have proposed steep electron density gradients, heavy positive ions, dressed aerosols, gravity waves and turbulence as possible explanations.

PMSE occurs in both the Arctic and Antarctic regions, and is sometimes accompanied by noctilucent clouds. A much less frequent phenomena, related to PMSE, is known as Mesospheric Summer Echoes (MSE). MSE can be observed at middle latitudes, e.g., along the Baltic coast. Many years of MSE observations using VHF radars in Northern Germany show that MSE occurs less frequently because the formation mechanism requires the transport of very cold polar air by equatorward mesospheric winds.

== See also ==
- Ionogram
