= Programme making and special events =

Programme Making and Special Events (PMSE) is a term used, typically in Europe, to denote equipment that is used to support broadcasting, news gathering, theatrical productions and special events, such as culture events, concerts, sport events, conferences and trade fairs. In North America, the use of spectrum to provide these services is usually called broadcast auxiliary service or BAS.

Typical examples include theatrical Wireless-microphone use, wireless-camera newsgathering operations and fixed point-to-point microwave links. The most significant PMSE users are those who use wireless microphones, talkback systems and/or in-ear monitors.

These devices operate in various spectrum bands. Traditionally, most PMSE equipment uses spectrum that is interleaved with other existing services. This is possible due to their low radiated power, thus making efficient use of the spectrum. Most used spectrum bands are the broadcasting bands (Band III and Bands IV/V) and military spectrum between roughly 1 and 5 GHz.

Within broadcasting, these applications are commonly known as SAB/SAP applications.

Special Event equipment is different from that used in broadcasting and may include more extensive use of lighting and sound equipment.
