= Asian television frequencies =

Asian television frequencies refer to the allocation and standardization of radio frequency bands used for television broadcasting across countries in Asia. These frequencies are regulated by regional authorities and international agreements to ensure compatibility and prevent interference between broadcasting systems. Various Asian nations employ different transmission standards, such as PAL, SECAM, and increasingly digital systems like DVB-T or ISDB.

== VHF ==
=== Japan ===
System J 525 lines
| Ch | Video (MHz) | Audio (MHz) |
|---|---|---|
| 1 | 91.25 | 95.75 |
| 2 | 97.25 | 101.75 |
| 3 | 103.25 | 107.75 |
| 4 | 171.25 | 175.75 |
| 5 | 177.25 | 181.75 |
| 6 | 183.25 | 187.75 |
| 7 | 189.25 | 193.75 |
| 8 | 193.25 | 197.75 |
| 9 | 199.25 | 203.75 |
| 10 | 205.25 | 209.75 |
| 11 | 211.25 | 215.75 |
| 12 | 217.25 | 221.75 |

=== People's Republic of China ===
==== Original P.R.C. channel assignments ====
System D 625 lines
| Ch | Video (MHz) | Audio (MHz) |
|---|---|---|
| 1 | 49.75 | 56.25 |
| 2 | 57.75 | 64.25 |
| 3 | 65.75 | 72.25 |
| 4 | 77.25 | 83.75 |
| 5 | 85.25 | 91.75 |
| 6 | 93.25 | 99.75 |

==== Assignments since c.1975 ====
System D 625 lines
| Ch | Video (MHz) | Audio (MHz) |
|---|---|---|
| 1 | 49.75 | 56.25 |
| 2 | 57.75 | 64.25 |
| 3 | 65.75 | 72.25 |
| 4 | 77.25 | 83.75 |
| 5 | 85.25 | 91.75 |
| 6 | 168.25 | 174.75 |
| 7 | 176.25 | 182.75 |
| 8 | 184.25 | 190.75 |
| 9 | 192.25 | 198.75 |
| 10 | 200.25 | 206.75 |
| 11 | 208.25 | 214.75 |
| 12 | 216.25 | 222.75 |

=== Republic of China (Taiwan) ===
System M 525 lines
| Ch | Video (MHz) | Audio (MHz) |
|---|---|---|
| 2 | 55.25 | 59.75 |
| 3 | 61.25 | 65.75 |
| 4 | 67.25 | 71.75 |
| 5 | 175.25 | 179.75 |
| 6 | 181.25 | 185.75 |
| 7 | 187.25 | 191.75 |
| 8 | 193.25 | 197.75 |
| 9 | 199.25 | 203.75 |
| 10 | 205.25 | 209.75 |
| 11 | 211.25 | 215.75 |
| 12 | 217.25 | 221.75 |

=== Indonesia ===
System B 625 lines
| Channel | Video carrier (MHz) | Audio carrier (MHz) |
|---|---|---|
| 1A | 44.25 | 49.75 |
| 2 | 55.25 | 60.75 |
| 3 | 62.25 | 67.75 |
| 4 | 175.25 | 180.75 |
| 5 | 182.25 | 187.75 |
| 6 | 189.25 | 194.75 |
| 7 | 196.25 | 201.75 |
| 8 | 203.25 | 208.75 |
| 9 | 210.25 | 215.75 |
| 10 | 217.25 | 222.75 |
| 11 | 224.25 | 229.75 |

=== Kingdom of Thailand, other border of island ===
System B 625 lines
| Channel | Lower Edge | Video (Mhz) | Audio (Mhz) | Upper Edge | Note |
|---|---|---|---|---|---|
| 0 | 40 | 41.25 | 43.75 | 44 | |
| 1 | 44 | 45.25 | 49.75 | 50 | Identical to America Channel 1 |
| 2 | 54 | 55.25 | 59.75 | 60 | Identical to America Channel 2 |
| 3 | 60 | 61.25 | 65.75 | 66 | Identical to America Channel 3 |
| 4 | 66 | 67.25 | 71.75 | 72 | Identical to America Channel 4 |
| 5 | 174 | 175.25 | 179.75 | 180 | Identical to America Channel 7 |
| 6 | 180 | 181.25 | 185.75 | 186 | Identical to America Channel 8 |
| 7 | 186 | 187.25 | 191.75 | 192 | Identical to America Channel 9 |
| 8 | 192 | 193.25 | 197.75 | 198 | Identical to America Channel 10 |
| 9 | 198 | 199.25 | 203.75 | 204 | Identical to America Channel 11 |
| 10 | 204 | 205.25 | 209.75 | 210 | Identical to America Channel 12 |
| 11 | 210 | 211.25 | 215.75 | 216 | Identical to America Channel 13 |
| 12 | 216 | 217.25 | 222.75 | 223 | Identical to Japan Channel 12 |
| 13 | 223 | 224.25 | 228.75 | 229 | |

Similar to the television frequency in America and Japan; same sound carrier as System M / N that uses 4.5 MHz sound carrier

=== Russia, Kazakhstan, Turkmenistan, Azerbaijan, North Korea, Vietnam and most Central Asia ===
System D 625 lines
| Channel | Video carrier (MHz) | Audio carrier (MHz) |
|---|---|---|
| 1 | 49.75 | 56.25 |
| 2 | 59.25 | 65.75 |
| 3 | 77.25 | 83.75 |
| 4 | 85.25 | 91.75 |
| 5 | 93.25 | 99.75 |
| 6 | 175.25 | 181.75 |
| 7 | 183.25 | 189.75 |
| 8 | 191.25 | 197.75 |
| 9 | 199.25 | 205.75 |
| 10 | 207.25 | 213.75 |
| 11 | 215.25 | 221.75 |
| 12 | 223.25 | 229.75 |

== UHF ==
=== Japan ===
System J 525 lines
| Ch | Video (MHz) | Audio (MHz) |
|---|---|---|
| 13 | 471.25 | 475.75 |
| 14 | 477.25 | 481.75 |
| 15 | 483.25 | 487.75 |
| 16 | 489.25 | 493.75 |
| 17 | 495.25 | 499.75 |
| 18 | 501.25 | 505.75 |
| 19 | 507.25 | 511.75 |
| 20 | 513.25 | 517.75 |
| 21 | 519.25 | 523.75 |
| 22 | 525.25 | 529.75 |
| 23 | 531.25 | 535.75 |
| 24 | 537.25 | 541.75 |
| 25 | 543.25 | 547.75 |
| 26 | 549.25 | 553.75 |
| 27 | 555.25 | 559.75 |
| 28 | 561.25 | 565.75 |
| 29 | 567.25 | 571.75 |
| 30 | 573.25 | 577.75 |
| 31 | 579.25 | 583.75 |
| 32 | 585.25 | 589.75 |
| 33 | 591.25 | 595.75 |
| 34 | 597.25 | 601.75 |
| 35 | 603.25 | 607.75 |
| 36 | 609.25 | 613.75 |
| 37 | 615.25 | 619.75 |
| 38 | 621.25 | 625.75 |
| 39 | 627.25 | 631.75 |
| 40 | 633.25 | 637.75 |
| 41 | 639.25 | 643.75 |
| 42 | 645.25 | 649.75 |
| 43 | 651.25 | 655.75 |
| 44 | 657.25 | 661.75 |
| 45 | 663.25 | 667.75 |
| 46 | 669.25 | 673.75 |
| 47 | 675.25 | 679.75 |
| 48 | 681.25 | 685.75 |
| 49 | 687.25 | 691.75 |
| 50 | 693.25 | 697.75 |
| 51 | 699.25 | 703.75 |
| 52 | 705.25 | 709.75 |
| 53 | 711.25 | 715.75 |
| 54 | 717.25 | 721.75 |
| 55 | 723.25 | 727.75 |
| 56 | 729.25 | 733.75 |
| 57 | 735.25 | 739.75 |
| 58 | 741.25 | 745.75 |
| 59 | 747.25 | 751.75 |
| 60 | 753.25 | 757.75 |
| 61 | 759.25 | 763.75 |
| 62 | 765.25 | 769.75 |

=== People's Republic of China ===
System D 625 lines
| Ch | Video (MHz) | Audio (MHz) |
|---|---|---|
| 13 | 471.25 | 477.75 |
| 14 | 479.25 | 485.75 |
| 15 | 487.25 | 493.75 |
| 16 | 495.25 | 501.75 |
| 17 | 503.25 | 509.75 |
| 18 | 511.25 | 517.75 |
| 19 | 519.25 | 525.75 |
| 20 | 527.25 | 533.75 |
| 21 | 535.25 | 541.75 |
| 22 | 543.25 | 549.75 |
| 23 | 551.25 | 557.75 |
| 24 | 559.25 | 565.75 |
| 25 | 605.25 | 611.75 |
| 26 | 613.25 | 619.75 |
| 27 | 621.25 | 627.75 |
| 28 | 629.25 | 635.75 |
| 29 | 637.25 | 643.75 |
| 30 | 645.25 | 651.75 |
| 31 | 653.25 | 659.75 |
| 32 | 661.25 | 667.75 |
| 33 | 669.25 | 675.75 |
| 34 | 677.25 | 683.75 |
| 35 | 685.25 | 691.75 |
| 36 | 693.25 | 699.75 |
| 37 | 701.25 | 707.75 |
| 38 | 709.25 | 715.75 |
| 39 | 717.25 | 723.75 |
| 40 | 725.25 | 731.75 |
| 41 | 733.25 | 739.75 |
| 42 | 741.25 | 747.75 |
| 43 | 749.25 | 755.75 |
| 44 | 757.25 | 763.75 |
| 45 | 765.25 | 771.75 |
| 46 | 773.25 | 779.75 |
| 47 | 781.25 | 787.75 |
| 48 | 789.25 | 795.75 |
| 49 | 797.25 | 803.75 |
| 50 | 805.25 | 811.75 |
| 51 | 813.25 | 819.75 |
| 52 | 821.25 | 827.75 |
| 53 | 829.25 | 835.75 |
| 54 | 837.25 | 843.75 |
| 55 | 845.25 | 851.75 |
| 56 | 853.25 | 859.75 |
| 57 | 861.25 | 867.75 |
| 58 | 871.25 | 877.75 |
| 59 | 879.25 | 885.75 |
| 60 | 887.25 | 893.75 |
| 61 | 895.25 | 901.75 |
| 62 | 903.25 | 909.75 |

NOTE: The original assignments of Channels 25 to 57 were 2 MHz higher in frequency until c.1984. Channels 58 to 62 were deleted at this time.

=== Indonesia, Singapore, Malaysia and most of Asia and Middle East ===
System G 625 lines (8 MHz / channel)UHF band
| Channel | Video carrier (MHz) | Audio carrier (MHz) |
|---|---|---|
| 21 | 471.25 | 476.75 |
| 22 | 479.25 | 484.75 |
| 23 | 487.25 | 492.75 |
| 24 | 495.25 | 500.75 |
| 25 | 503.25 | 508.75 |
| 26 | 511.25 | 516.75 |
| 27 | 519.25 | 524.75 |
| 28 | 527.25 | 532.75 |
| 29 | 535.25 | 540.75 |
| 30 | 543.25 | 548.75 |
| 31 | 551.25 | 556.75 |
| 32 | 559.25 | 564.75 |
| 33 | 567.25 | 572.75 |
| 34 | 575.25 | 580.75 |
| 35 | 583.25 | 588.75 |
| 36 | 591.25 | 596.75 |
| 37 | 599.25 | 604.75 |
| 38 | 607.25 | 612.75 |
| 39 | 615.25 | 620.75 |
| 40 | 623.25 | 628.75 |
| 41 | 631.25 | 636.75 |
| 42 | 639.25 | 644.75 |
| 43 | 647.25 | 652.75 |
| 44 | 655.25 | 660.75 |
| 45 | 663.25 | 668.75 |
| 46 | 671.25 | 676.75 |
| 47 | 679.25 | 684.75 |
| 48 | 687.25 | 692.75 |
| 49 | 695.25 | 700.75 |
| 50 | 703.25 | 708.75 |
| 51 | 711.25 | 716.75 |
| 52 | 719.25 | 724.75 |
| 53 | 727.25 | 732.75 |
| 54 | 735.25 | 740.75 |
| 55 | 743.25 | 748.75 |
| 56 | 751.25 | 756.75 |
| 57 | 759.25 | 764.75 |
| 58 | 767.25 | 772.75 |
| 59 | 775.25 | 780.75 |
| 60 | 783.25 | 788.75 |
| 61 | 791.25 | 796.75 |
| 62 | 799.25 | 804.75 |

NOTE:

- Channel 21 is not used for television broadcasting in Indonesia.
- Channels 22 to 48 are used for DVB-T2 digital TV broadcasting in Indonesia, Singapore, Malaysia and Brunei.

=== Hong Kong and Macau ===
System I 625 lines
| Channel | Video carrier (MHz) | Audio carrier (MHz) |
|---|---|---|
| 21 | 471.25 | 477.25 |
| 22 | 479.25 | 485.25 |
| 23 | 487.25 | 493.25 |
| 24 | 495.25 | 501.25 |
| 25 | 503.25 | 509.25 |
| 26 | 511.25 | 517.25 |
| 27 | 519.25 | 525.25 |
| 28 | 527.25 | 533.25 |
| 29 | 535.25 | 541.25 |
| 30 | 543.25 | 549.25 |
| 31 | 551.25 | 557.25 |
| 32 | 559.25 | 565.25 |
| 33 | 567.25 | 573.25 |
| 34 | 575.25 | 581.25 |
| 35 | 583.25 | 589.25 |
| 36 | 591.25 | 597.25 |
| 37 | 599.25 | 605.25 |
| 38 | 607.25 | 613.25 |
| 39 | 615.25 | 621.25 |
| 40 | 623.25 | 629.25 |
| 41 | 631.25 | 637.25 |
| 42 | 639.25 | 645.25 |
| 43 | 647.25 | 653.25 |
| 44 | 655.25 | 661.25 |
| 45 | 663.25 | 669.25 |
| 46 | 671.25 | 677.25 |
| 47 | 679.25 | 685.25 |
| 48 | 687.25 | 693.25 |
| 49 | 695.25 | 701.25 |
| 50 | 703.25 | 709.25 |
| 51 | 711.25 | 717.25 |
| 52 | 719.25 | 725.25 |
| 53 | 727.25 | 733.25 |
| 54 | 735.25 | 741.25 |
| 55 | 743.25 | 749.25 |
| 56 | 751.25 | 757.25 |
| 57 | 759.25 | 765.25 |
| 58 | 767.25 | 773.25 |
| 59 | 775.25 | 781.25 |
| 60 | 783.25 | 789.25 |
| 61 | 791.25 | 797.25 |
| 62 | 799.25 | 805.25 |
| 63 | 807.25 | 813.25 |
| 64 | 815.25 | 821.25 |
| 65 | 823.25 | 829.25 |
| 66 | 831.25 | 837.25 |
| 67 | 839.25 | 845.25 |
| 68 | 847.25 | 853.25 |
| 69 | 855.25 | 861.25 |

== See also ==
- Broadcast television systems
  - ATSC (standards)
  - Multichannel television sound
  - NTSC
  - NTSC-J
  - PAL
  - RCA
  - SECAM
- Early television stations
- Knife-edge effect
  - Channel 37
- North American broadcast television frequencies
- North American cable television frequencies
- Australasian television frequencies
