= Field Day (amateur radio) =

Annual amateur radio exercise

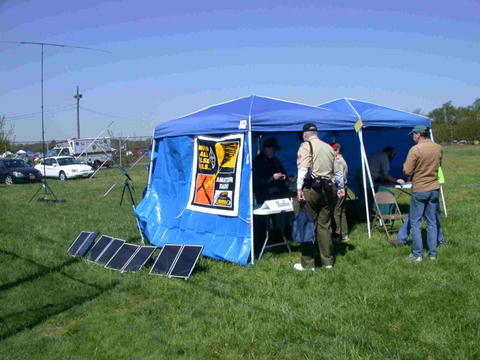
Solar-powered Amateur Radio Station in tents with portable VHF/UHF satellite and HF antennas in the background

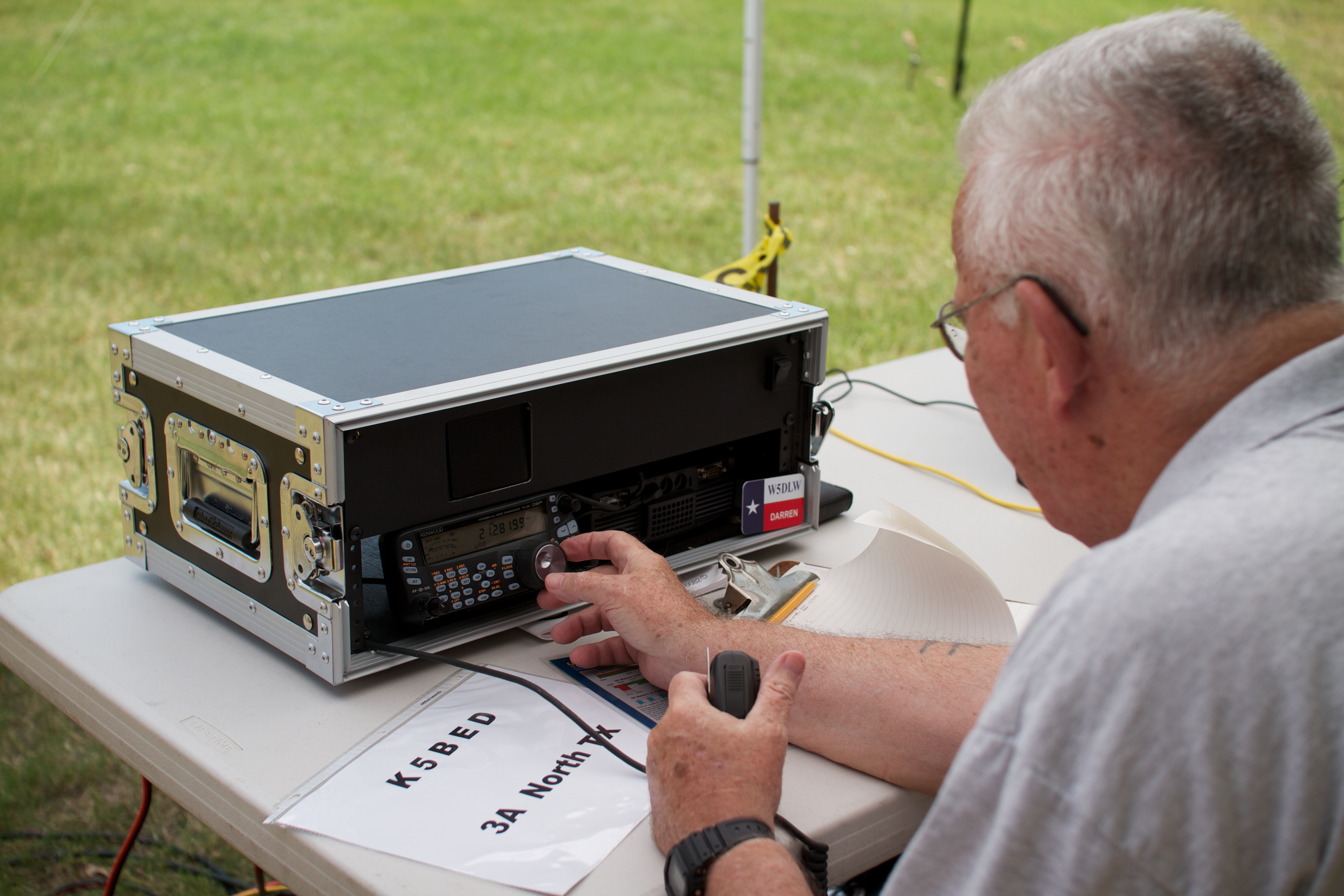
HF transceiver for voice communications

Field Day is an annual amateur radio contest, widely sponsored by IARU regions and member organizations, encouraging emergency communications preparedness among amateur radio operators. In the United States, it is typically the largest single emergency preparedness exercise in the country, with over 30,000 operators participating each year. Field Day is always the fourth full weekend of June, beginning at 18:00 UTC Saturday and running through 20:59 UTC Sunday.

Since the first ARRL Field Day in 1933, radio amateurs throughout North America have practiced the rapid deployment of radio communications equipment in environments ranging from operations under tents in remote areas to operations inside Emergency Operations Centers (EOCs). Operations using emergency and alternative power sources are highly encouraged, since electricity and other public infrastructures are often among the first to fail during a natural disaster or severe weather.

To determine the effectiveness of the exercise and of each participant's operations, there is an integrated competitive component, and many clubs also engage in concurrent leisure activities (e.g., camping, cookouts). Operations typically last a continuous twenty-four hours, requiring scheduled relief operators to keep stations on the air. Additional contest points are awarded for experimenting with unusual modes, making contacts via satellite, and involving youth in the activity.

== International Field Day events ==
=== IARU Region 1 ===
The IARU Region 1 sponsors an Amateur Radio Field Day for Europe.

==== Belgium ====
The Royal Union of Belgian Radio Amateurs (UBA) organizes the Field Days in Belgium.

==== United Kingdom ====
The Radio Society of Great Britain (RSGB) holds its Field Days with the Region 1 schedule, but has its own awards independent of the rest of the IARU region:

- CW: First full weekend of June from Saturday 15:00 UTC to Sunday 15:00 UTC (June 1–2, 2019).
- SSB: First full weekend of September from Saturday 13:00 UTC to Sunday 13:00 UTC (September 7–8, 2019).

==== Germany ====
The Deutscher Amateur-Radio-Club e. V. (DARC), Referat DX u. HF Funksport, holds its Field Days with the Region 1 schedule:

- CW: First full weekend of June from Saturday 15:00 UTC to Sunday 15:00 UTC (June 1–2, 2019).
- SSB: First full weekend of September from Saturday 13:00 UTC to Sunday 13:00 UTC (September 7–8, 2019).

==== Greece ====
The Radio Amateur Association of Greece organizes the national field day with the Region 1 SSB field day (first weekend of September). It issues its own awards for the highest scoring Greek stations who participate and submit contest logs.

==== Italy ====
The Associazione Radioamatori Italiani (A.R.I.), holds its Field Days with the Region 1 schedule:

- CW: First full weekend of June from Saturday 15:00 UTC to Sunday 15:00 UTC (June 4–5, 2022).
- SSB: First full weekend of September from Saturday 13:00 UTC to Sunday 13:00 UTC (September 3–4, 2022).

=== IARU Region 2 ===
==== United States and Canada ====
The American Radio Relay League/Radio Amateurs of Canada Field Day is held annually during the fourth full weekend in June, beginning at 18:00 UTC Saturday and running through 20:59 UTC Sunday.

Sponsored by the ARRL and RAC (but organized primarily by the ARRL), Field Day is open to all Amateur Radio operators covered by these two IARU member organizations.

==== Brazil ====
The Scout Movement in Brazil also participates in Scout Field Day with the participation of Amateur Radio Scouts during the second week of June. SCOUT FIELD DAY, like what happens around the world, takes young people to the countryside, squares, grounds and public places, other than Scout headquarters, so that they can assemble their equipment, if possible in a sustainable way, to work during a short time in emergency mode, safely, learning details and preparing to save or help save lives. Scouts Field Day is a camp or excursion with the same preparations as any other scouting activity, however, with the use of radio stations, in VHF, UHF and HF, transmitting and receiving signals via phone and even telegraphy.

Website: https://www.escoteiros.org.br/radioescotismo-2023/

=== IARU Region 3 ===
There is currently no organized Field Day for all of Region 3, although there is a proposal to create one similar to that of Region 1: Recommendation WG 2-10 (page 7).

==== Taiwan ====
There is apparently a biannual Field Day held in Taiwan, by the Chinese Taipei Amateur Radio League.

==== New Zealand ====
The New Zealand Association of Radio Transmitters (NZART) holds an HF National Field Day contest each February, and a VHF Field Day each December.

==== Korea ====
The Korean Amateur Radio League holds a field day for two to five days at a regional branch area during summer every year.

==== Australia ====
The Wireless Institute of Australia (WIA) holds the John Moyle Field Day in March every year.

== Emergency preparedness ==
Field Day stresses emergency preparedness. Frequently, entire radio clubs get involved and assemble a portable radio station in a field or park. Some might use quickly deployable portable antennas while others might erect more elaborate radio masts and towers supporting several antennas. Generators or solar power provide electricity to amateur radio transceivers, which may be located in tents, cars, recreational vehicles, or other portable shelters.

== Contest activity and rules ==
Officially, field day in the US is an operating event and not a contest. However, it operates exactly like a contest, but without awards.

The competitive aspect of a Field Day operating event is to contact as many stations as possible in the given time period (twenty-four hours, during a weekend, if setup commences before the contest starts, or 27 hours if setup commences at contest start time) using the portable station. Each station will exchange information with other participating stations. For the North American Field Day, the exchange consists of the station call sign, the name of the ARRL-recognized section from which the station is operating, and a class designator which indicates the number of transmitters concurrently used at the station and information about the type of electrical power source being used.

The contest portion of Field Day has two purposes. The primary purpose is to test the group's ability to plan operations that can be effective for an entire twenty-four-hour period, including operator endurance and adequate numbers of operators for a shift operation. The secondary portion is to demonstrate the technical proficiency of the station that has been hastily constructed for the purpose; in theory a better station will be capable of emergency operations in dire conditions. Such a station will also be capable of making more contacts during the contest portion of Field Day. Point systems are structured to motivate emergency preparedness activities, such as designating a safety officer for the station or incorporating auxiliary power capabilities.

The rules governing this activity are published by the sponsor of the particular Field Day exercise.

== Promotion of amateur radio ==
Field Day is frequently used to attract significant publicity for amateur radio, and some clubs simultaneously demonstrate technologies including single sideband voice, Morse code (commonly called CW), digital modes (such as RTTY, PSK31, and Winlink, among others), and communication via amateur radio satellite.
