= RFinder =

Service concerning amateur radio repeaters

RFinder ("repeater finder") is a subscription-based website and mobile app. RFinder's main service is the World Wide Repeater Directory (WWRD), which is a directory of amateur radio repeaters. RFinder is the official repeater directory of several amateur radio associations. RFinder has listings for several amateur radio modes, including FM, D-STAR, DMR, and ATV.

== World Wide Repeater Directory ==
Repeaters are listed in the directory along with its call sign, Maidenhead Locator System and GPS coordinates, transmit/receive offset ("split"), CTCSS and DCS squelch settings, and VoIP settings (IRLP and Echolink nodes). The directory has over 50,000 repeater listings in over 170 countries.

== Subscription ==
RFinder requires a subscription. A one-year subscription is US$12.99.

== Radio programming software ==
Some radio programming software applications can query RFinder and download repeater listing to program radios. Compatible software includes:

- CHIRP
- RT Systems

== Radio associations ==
RFinder is the official repeater directory of the following associations:

- Amateur Radio Society Italy
- American Radio Relay League
- Cayman Amateur Radio Society
- Deutscher Amateur Radio Club
- Federacion Mexicana de Radio Experimentadores
- L’association Réseau des Émetteurs Français
- Lietuvos Radijo Mėgėjų Draugija
- Liga de Amadores Brasilieros de Radio Emissão
- Radio Amateurs of Canada
- Radio Society of Great Britain
- Rede dos Emissores Portugueses
- Unión de Radioaficionados Españoles
