= RCP =

RCP may refer to:

== Architecture ==
- Reinforced concrete pipe
- Reflected ceiling plan

== Computer technology ==
- RCP (chip), a co-processor chip designed by Silicon Graphics for use in the Nintendo 64 gaming system
- rcp (Unix), a command on the Unix operating systems that is used to remote copy a file
- Rapid control prototyping, a process that lets engineers quickly test and iterate their control strategies
- Restore Cursor Position (ANSI), an ANSI X3.64 escape sequence
- Rich Client Platform, a software development platform helping software developers to rapidly build new applications
- Remote Control Protocol, a protocol that allows CEC enabled TVs to control MHL compatible devices

== Medicine ==
- Respiratory Care Practitioner
- Retrograde cholangiopancreatography
- Royal College of Physicians, located in London, Edinburgh, and Ireland

== Organizations ==
- Radio Club Paraguayo, an amateur radio organization in Paraguay
- Radio Club Peruano, an amateur radio organization in Peru
- Radio Corporation of the Philippines, the oldest radio network in the Philippines
- Rochester Community Players, a theatrical company in Rochester, NY

=== Businesses ===
- RCP Design Global, a French design agency
- RIT Capital Partners, a large UK investment trust

=== Political groups ===
- Revolutionary Communist Party (disambiguation), the name of several revolutionary communist parties worldwide
- Romanian Communist Party
- Russian Communist Party, the second of four names used at different times by the Communist Party of the Soviet Union

== Science ==
- Reactor Coolant Pumps in International Reactor Innovative and Secure nuclear reactors
- Representative Concentration Pathways, scenarios of greenhouse gas trajectories
- Right circular polarization, in radio communications/radio astronomy
- Rapid crack propagation, in testing of plastic pipes
- Radiochemical purity, % radiodetected peak area of the intact radiolabeled peptide vs all radio peaks measured during the same analyses

== Other uses ==
- Radio College Park, a Persian podcast
- Random close pack, packing method for objects
- RealClearPolitics, an American conservative website
- Retention Control Point, high year tenure in the United States Army
- Rose City Park, Portland, Oregon, United States
- Royal Commonwealth Pool in Edinburgh, Scotland, UK
- Rádio Clube Português, a defunct Portuguese radio station
