= PZK =

PZK may refer to:

- Polski Związek Krótkofalowców, an amateur radio organization in Poland
- Polish Cycling Federation (Polski Związek Kolarski), a cycling organization in Poland
