= WWRD =

WWRD may refer to:

- WWRD-LP, a defunct low-power television station (channel 32) formerly licensed to Centerville, Ohio, United States
- What would Reagan do? (abbreviated as WWRD), a phrase that has become popular primarily among conservatives and Republicans in the United States
- WWRD Holdings Limited, a company owned by Fiskars which owns the luxury goods brands Waterford Crystal, Wedgwood and Royal Doulton.
- World Wide Repeater Directory, the main product of RFinder
