= RCH =

RCH may stand for:

- Radio Club de Honduras, an amateur radio organization
- Railway Clearing House, the British financial clearing house and technical standards bureau for railways
- The Royal Canadian Hussars (Montreal), a unit of the Canadian Forces
- Royal Children's Hospital, Melbourne, Australia
- Royal Columbian Hospital, in New Westminster, British Columbia, Canada
- Almirante Padilla Airport (IATA airport code: RCH) in Riohacha, Colombia
- RCH (football club) (Racing Club Heemstede), in the Netherlands
- RCH (cars), a Greek kit and replica car manufacturer
- RCH, an American car made by Hupmobile c. 1912
- RCH, a call sign used by the United States Air Mobility Command
