= LCRA =

LCRA may refer to:

- Lower Colorado River Authority, a public utility in Texas, United States
- Local Community Radio Act, a broadcast law in the United States
- Liga Colombiana de Radioaficionados, the national amateur radio organization in Colombia
- The ICAO code for RAF Akrotiri, a military airbase in Akrotiri, Cyprus
