= IARS (disambiguation) =

IARS is a human gene.

IARS may also refer to:

- International Anesthesia Research Society
- Illawarra Amateur Radio Society
- Iraqi Amateur Radio Society
- Institute of Arab Research and Studies
