= RCV =

RCV may stand for:

- Rabbit calicivirus
- RCV (Radio Christian Voice), independent radio station in Zambia, established 1994
- Radio Club Venezolano, Venezuela
- Ranked-choice voting
- Red cell volume, a concept related to hematocrit but concerning total rather than percentage
- Refuse collection vehicle
- Remote control vehicle
- RCV Film Distribution, a former Dutch film distributor
- Riot control vehicle, see RCV-9
- Rubrik Cloud Vault
