= HRS =

HRS may refer to:

== Businesses ==
- Hot Record Society, an American jazz label
- Hydraulics Research Station Ltd. (now HR Wallingford Ltd.), a British hydrology firm

== Education ==
- Copenhagen Hospitality College (Danish: Hotel og Restaurantskolen), Denmark
- Head-Royce School, Oakland, California
- Helena Romanes School, Essex, England

== Government and policy ==
- Historical Records Survey, an American New Deal project
- Human Rights Service, a Norwegian think tank
- Hydraulics Research Station, a UK government body, now privatised

== Medicine ==
- Health and Retirement Study, a research study into ageing in the US
- Heart Rhythm Society
- Hepatorenal syndrome

== Technology ==
- HRS, a Rockwell scale of materials' hardness
- HRS antenna, a radio antenna
- Sikorsky HRS, a helicopter

== Other uses ==
- Croatian Amateur Radio Association (Croatian: Hrvatski radioamaterski savez)
- Croatian Handball Federation (Croatian: Hrvatski rukometni savez)
- Girls' Generation-HRS, a South Korean girl group
- Historical Social Research, a bilingual German academic journal
- Hallucinogen Rating Scale, a psychometric scale for measuring hallucinogen effects
- House Rabbit Society, an American animal rescue
- Habib Rizieq Shihab, an Indonesian cleric

== See also ==
- HR (disambiguation)
- Hours (disambiguation)
