= Labre =

Labre (French pronunciation: [labʁ]) is a French surname. Notable people with the surname include:

- Benedict Joseph Labre (1748–1783), French mendicant
- Yvon Labre (born 1949), Canadian ice hockey player

== See also ==
- LABRE, League of Brazilian Amateur Radio Transmitters
