= Bangladesh Amateur Radio League =

Non-profit organisation

- Abbreviation: BARL
- Formation: 20 May 1979
- Type: Non-profit organization
- Purpose: Advocacy, Education
- Location(s): Dhaka, Bangladesh; NL53eu
- Region served: Bangladesh
- Official language: English
- President: Ln. Mohammad Didarul Husain (S21DC)
- Affiliations: International Amateur Radio Union

The Bangladesh Amateur Radio League (BARL) is a national non-profit organization for amateur radio enthusiasts in Bangladesh. BARL is the national member society representing Bangladesh in the International Amateur Radio Union, which it joined in 1982.

== History ==
Amateur radio activities in East Pakistan were suspended during the war with India in 1965, and the ban on amateur radio activities remained in effect after Bangladesh achieved independence from Pakistan in 1971. The Bangladesh Amateur Radio League was founded on 20 May 1979 by radio enthusiasts and immediately began lobbying the government for approval of amateur radio operation in the country. Efforts to legalize amateur radio in Bangladesh would not succeed until 1991, when a new democratically elected government faced a telecommunications emergency during a major cyclone. Persuaded of the value amateur radio could offer Bangladesh society, amateur radio was legalized in the country, with many restrictions, on 29 August 1991. Amateur radio license examinations and license grants were suspended by the government in 2004. Representatives of the Bangladesh Amateur Radio League lobbied the Bangladesh Telecommunication Regulatory Commission to reinstate the examinations and licensing process, which was resumed on 13 August 2008.

== Governance ==
The 2018 Annual General Meeting (AGM) of the Bangladesh Amateur Radio League took place on 11 May 2018 at Dhaka. Almost all of the members were present at the meeting, which concluded with elections of a new executive committee. Ln. Mohammad Didarul Husain (S21DC) was elected president, Mustahidul Islam (S21MO) were elected Vice Presidents, Md Rashidul Alam Ripon (S21RM) was elected General-Secretary, Mukul Hossain (S21MB) was elected Assistant Secretary and Miah Mohammad Fardous Zahan Appollo (S21AD) was elected Treasurer. Members at Large include Ms. Mukul Akther (S21MD), Md Ismail (S21AY), Yunus Ali (S21RX), Rafiqul Alam (S21RI) and Marzuk Radin Anwar (S21MN).

== See also ==
- Pakistan Amateur Radio Society
- List of radio stations in Bangladesh
