= Israel Association of Radio Communication =

Organisation for amateur radio enthusiasts in Israel

אגודת תקשורת הרדיו הישראלית Israel Association of Radio Communication
- Abbreviation: IARC
- Type: Non-profit organization
- Purpose: Advocacy, Education
- Location(s): Tel-Aviv, Israel; KM72ka
- Region served: Israel
- Official language: Hebrew
- President: David Ben Basat 4X1WH
- Affiliations: International Amateur Radio Union
- Website: http://www.iarc.org/

The Israel Association of Radio Communication (IARC) (Hebrew: אגודת תקשורת הרדיו הישראלית), formerly the Israel Amateur Radio Club (Hebrew: אגודת חובבי הרדיו בישראל), is a national non-profit organization for amateur radio enthusiasts in Israel. The organization uses IARC as its official international abbreviation, based on the English translation of the Hebrew name. IARC promotes amateur radio by sponsoring amateur radio operating awards and radio contests. The IARC operates a QSL bureau for those members who regularly communicate with amateur radio operators in other countries. The IARC represents the interests of Israeli amateur radio operators and shortwave listeners before Israeli and international telecommunications regulatory authorities. IARC is the national member society representing Israel in the International Amateur Radio Union.

== See also ==
- International Amateur Radio Union
