= Liga Panameña de Radioaficionados =

Liga Panameña de Radioaficionados Panamanian Amateur Radio League
- Abbreviation: LPRA
- Type: Non-profit organization
- Purpose: Advocacy, Education
- Headquarters: Changuinola, Panama; EJ89rk
- Region served: Panama
- Official language: Spanish
- President: Dario Jurado HP1DJ
- Affiliations: International Amateur Radio Union
- Website: http://www.qsl.net/lpr

The Liga Panameña de Radioaficionados (LPRA) (in English, Panamanian Amateur Radio League) is a national non-profit organization for amateur radio enthusiasts in Panama. Key membership benefits of the LPRA include a QSL bureau for those amateur radio operators in regular communications with other amateur radio operators in foreign countries, and a network to support amateur radio emergency communications. LPRA represents the interests of Panamanian amateur radio operators before Panamanian and international regulatory authorities. LPRA is the national member society representing Panama in the International Amateur Radio Union.
