= Ukrainian Amateur Radio League =

Ukrainian Amateur Radio League Ліга Pадіоаматорів України
- Abbreviation: UARL
- Type: Non-profit organization
- Purpose: Amateur radio
- Location(s): Kyiv, Ukraine KO50fk
- Region served: Ukraine
- Official language: Ukrainian
- President: Anatoly Kirilenko, UT3UY
- Affiliations: International Amateur Radio Union
- Website: http://www.uarl.org.ua/

The Ukrainian Amateur Radio League (Ukrainian: Ліга Pадіоаматорів України, romanized: Liha Radioamatoriv Ukrainy) is a national non-profit organization for amateur radio enthusiasts in Ukraine. The organization uses UARL as its official abbreviation, based on the standard abbreviation of the Ukrainian name translated into English. UARL promotes amateur radio in Ukraine by sponsoring amateur radio operating awards, radio contests, and Amateur Radio Direction Finding competitions. UARL also represents the interests of Ukrainian amateur radio operators before Ukrainian and international telecommunications regulatory authorities. UARL is the national member society representing Ukraine in the International Amateur Radio Union.

Location address: UARL, Office 29, 52/2 Peremohy Ave., Kyiv, 03057, Ukraine.

Post address for mail and QSL cards: UARL, P.O. Box 56 Kyiv -1, 01001 Ukraine.

== See also ==
- International Amateur Radio Union
