= Mauritius Amateur Radio Society =

- Abbreviation: MARS
- Formation: 1968
- Type: Non-profit organization
- Purpose: Advocacy, Education
- Location: Quatre Bornes, Mauritius LG89rr
- Region served: Mauritius
- Members: 30
- President: Patrick Randamy 3B8GF
- Affiliations: International Amateur Radio Union
- Website: http://www.qsl.net/mars/

The Mauritius Amateur Radio Society (MARS) is a national non-profit organization for amateur radio enthusiasts in Mauritius. The organization was founded in 1968 by a group of native Mauritians and British expatriates. The Society applied to join the International Amateur Radio Union on March 12, 1968, the day that Mauritius gained independence from Great Britain. MARS operates a QSL bureau for those members who regularly communicate with amateur radio operators in other countries, and offers radio equipment to its members for their use. MARS represents the interests of the amateur radio operators and shortwave listeners of Mauritius before national and international telecommunications regulatory authorities. MARS is the national member society representing Mauritius in the International Amateur Radio Union.

== See also ==
- International Amateur Radio Union
