= Syrian Scientific Technical Amateur Radio Society =

- Abbreviation: SSTARS
- Formation: 1947
- Type: Non-profit organization
- Purpose: Advocacy, Education
- Location: Damascus, Syria KM83dm
- Region served: Syria
- Members: 25
- President: Omar Shabsigh YK1AO
- Affiliations: International Amateur Radio Union
- Website: http://www.qsl.net/tir/

The Syrian Scientific Technical Amateur Radio Society (SSTARS) is a national non-profit organization for amateur radio enthusiasts in Syria. The organization was founded in 1947 as the Technical Institute of Radio by a group of amateur radio enthusiasts in Damascus. Rashid Jalal YK1AA served as the organization president from 1947 until 1983. The organization formally incorporated under its new name in 2005.

Key membership benefits of the SSTARS include a QSL bureau for those amateur radio operators in regular communications with other amateur radio operators in foreign countries, and a network to support amateur radio emergency communications. SSTARS represents the interests of Syrian amateur radio operators before Syrian and international regulatory authorities. SSTARS is the national member society representing Syria in the International Amateur Radio Union.

== See also ==
- International Amateur Radio Union
