= Association Royale des Radio Amateurs du Maroc =

A.R.R.A.M - Association Royale des Radio Amateurs du Maroc Moroccan Royal Association of Amateurs Radio
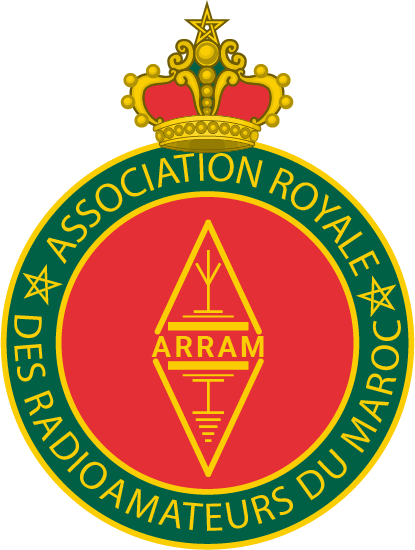
- Logo officiel de l'Association Royale des RadioAmateurs du Maroc

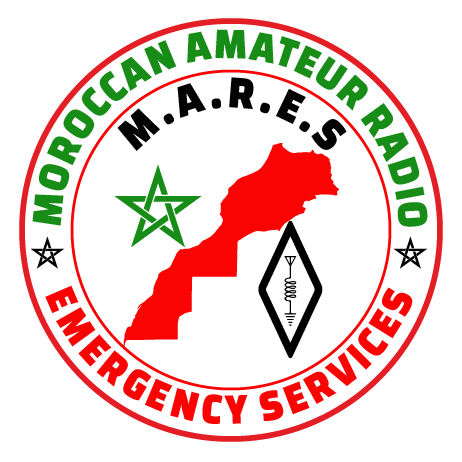
- Moroccan Amateur Radio Emergency Services - M.A.R.E.S- Logo
- Formation: October 1966
- Type: Non-profit organization
- Legal status: Association
- Location(s): Rabat, Morocco IM63ox
- Region served: Morocco
- Official language: French arabic
- President: Mohamed Haramou Secretary:
- Website: not available

The Association Royale des Radio Amateurs du Maroc (ARRAM) (in English, Royal Association of Radio Amateurs of Morocco) is a national non-profit organization for amateur radio enthusiasts in Morocco. Key membership benefits of the ARRAM include a QSL bureau for those amateur radio operators in regular communications with other amateur radio operators in foreign countries, and a network to support amateur radio emergency communications.

The ARRAM operates a club station with the call sign CN8MC. represents the interests of Moroccan amateur radio operators before Moroccan and international regulatory authorities. The ARRAM is the national member society representing Morocco in the International Amateur Radio Union.
