= Radio Club Uruguayo =

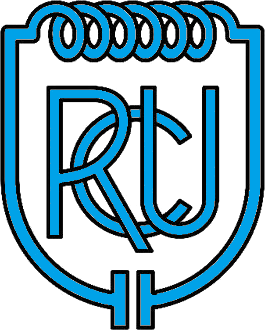
- Abbreviation: RCU
- Formation: August 23, 1933
- Type: Non-profit organization
- Location(s): Montevideo, Uruguay; GF15wc
- Region served: Uruguay
- Official language: Spanish
- President: Victor Gómez
- Main organ: Carlos Rodríguez, Horacio Nigro, Pablo Vidal, Anibal Gonzalez, Joan López, Pablo Peraza.
- Affiliations: International Amateur Radio Union
- Website: cx1aa.org

The Radio Club Uruguayo (in English, literally Radio Club of Uruguay) is a national non-profit organization for amateur radio enthusiasts in Uruguay. RCU was founded on August 23, 1933. The RCU operates a QSL bureau for those amateur radio operators in regular contact with amateur radio operators in other countries. Radio Club Uruguayo represents the interests of their associated amateur radio operators in Uruguay before national, and international regulatory authorities. RCU is the national member society representing Uruguay in the International Amateur Radio Union.

== See also ==
- International Amateur Radio Union
