= Asocijacija radioamatera u Bosni i Hercegovini =

Asocijacija Radioamatera u Bosni i Hercegovini Amateur Radio Association of Bosnia and Hercegovina
- Abbreviation: ARABH, ARABiH
- Formation: 1947
- Type: Non-profit organization
- Purpose: Advocacy, Education
- Location(s): Sarajevo, Bosnia and Herzegovina; JN93eu
- Region served: Bosnia and Herzegovina
- Members: 4,173
- Official language: Bosnian
- President: Mevludin Memić, E75M
- Affiliations: International Amateur Radio Union
- Website: https://www.arabih.ba/

The Asocijacija Radioamatera u Bosni i Hercegovini (ARAuBiH) (in English, Amateur Radio Association of Bosnia and Hercegovina) is a national non-profit organization for amateur radio enthusiasts in Bosnia and Herzegovina. Key membership benefits of ARAuBiH include the sponsorship of amateur radio operating awards and radio contests, and a QSL bureau for those members who regularly communicate with amateur radio operators in other countries. ARAuBiH publishes a specialty radio and electronics magazine called RADIO T9. ARAuBiH represents the interests of the amateur radio operators of Bosnia and Herzegovina before national, European, and international telecommunications regulatory authorities. ARAuBiH is the national member society representing Bosnia and Herzegovina in the International Amateur Radio Union.

Amateur Union of Bosnia and Herzegovina was established in Sarajevo in 1947. Around the same time, the local unions were established in other major cities of the Republic.

By the 1950s, activity mostly boiled down to simple homemade amateur radio equipment. This has helped to create the conditions for the establishment of more complex forms of communication in the country and beyond. The first ham radio contact in BiH was on 6 July 1950. This prompted further development of amateur radio in Bosnia and Herzegovina, exhilarating Alliance to begin organizing federal, republican and club competitions.

During the seventies, the Bosnian-Herzegovinian hams have increasingly sophisticated radio equipment and antenna systems, and begin to make better placements in national and international competitions.

After the outbreak of war in Croatia in 1991, and BH hams begin sending news about these events through short and ultrashort waves.

After the outbreak of war in Bosnia and Herzegovina in 1992. The phone systems were largely cut off from the vast majority parts of the country, and the inner regions were completely blocked. Ham radio work has become vitally important in such circumstances.

Hams were used for the first time in April 1992 to send information to other parts of Europe and the world about the situation in Bosnia and Herzegovina. Messages were sent to individuals, governments, the media, humanitarian organizations and religious communities. In many cases, ham radio was the only way for the Bosnians to stay in touch with their loved ones who have been out of the country, and the only way for people from around the world to obtain information about their families and friends who have been under siege. It is estimated that during the war more than three million messages exchanged, and about 1,500 young people passed their first exam and become amateur radio operators.

Hams from neighboring countries, Europe and the rest of the world the most help in the exchange of humanitarian messages during the war of 1992-96.

At the beginning of 1993, The Republic of Bosnia and Herzegovina joins International Telecommunication Union (ITU) as an independent state and a member of the UN gets prefix T9.

The association of radio amateurs of Bosnia and Herzegovina became a member of International Amateur Radio Union (IARU) on 27 December 1993.

Merit Association hams Bosnia and Herzegovina was recognized by the International League of Humanists on 16 November 1999 in Trieste and awarded in recognition of the work and contributions during the war.

So far, there are 4173 amateur radio licenses issued by ARAuBiH. They are registered in the database ARAuBiH. The current number of members ARAuBiH, who have paid the fee for the current year, is about 850. ARAuBiH has diversified repeater network and the network of digital communication that helps in connecting with the world. Every year we organize a lot of socializing and BH amateur championships in various disciplines.

Amateur radio operators from Bosnia and Herzegovina participate in the work of all the major international amateur radio organizations, and our competitors usually end up near the top in all major international competitions. ARAuBiH also became the first member of CEPT from all other Union resulting from the disintegration of former Yugoslavia. In 1999, ARAuBiH began to publish a specialized magazine for electronics and telecommunications, "Radio T9", which is also distributed in other European countries. Recognized as one of the best specialized amateur radio magazine.

== See also ==
- International Amateur Radio Union
