= Österreichischer Versuchssenderverband =

Non-profit organization

Österreichischer Versuchssenderverband Austrian Amateur Radio Society
- Abbreviation: ÖVSV
- Formation: 1921
- Type: Non-profit organization
- Purpose: Advocacy, Education
- Location(s): Vienna, Austria JN88eb
- Region served: Austria
- Official language: Austrian German
- President: Michael Zwingl OE3MZC
- Affiliations: International Amateur Radio Union
- Website: https://www.oevsv.at/

The Österreichischer Versuchssenderverband (ÖVSV) (in English, Austrian Amateur Radio Society) is a national non-profit organization for amateur radio enthusiasts in Austria. Key membership benefits of the ÖVSV include the sponsorship of amateur radio operating awards, radio contests, and a QSL bureau for members who regularly communicate with amateur radio operators in other countries. ÖVSV represents the interests of Austrian amateur radio operators before Austrian and international telecommunications regulatory authorities.

The ÖVSV is organized on a federal model, with a Dachverband, the National Umbrella Organisation, nine Landesverbände, the Provincial Associations, and the Austrian Military Radio Society. OEVSV is the national member society representing Austria in the International Amateur Radio Union.

== Radiosport ==
ÖVSV organizes annually two amateur radio contests:

- The All-OE 40/80m contest and cross-service event, always on May 1
- The All-OE 160m contest in November

== See also ==
- International Amateur Radio Union
