= Amateurs Radio Algeriens =

Amateurs Radio Algeriens Association of Algerian Amateurs Radio
- Abbreviation: ARA
- Formation: March 23, 1963
- Type: Non-profit organization
- Purpose: Advocacy, Education
- Location(s): Algiers, Algeria; JM16ms
- Region served: Algeria
- Official language: Arabic, French
- President: Afif BENLAGHA, 7X2RO (2013-Today)
- Affiliations: International Amateur Radio Union
- Website: ara.dz
- Remarks: Old link ara-dz.org

The Amateurs Radio Algeriens (ARA; English: Association of Algerian Radio Amateurs) is a national non-profit organization for amateur radio enthusiasts in Algeria. The organisation was founded on March 23, 1963. Key membership benefits of the ARA include a QSL bureau for those amateur radio operators in regular communications with other amateur radio operators in foreign countries, and a network to support amateur radio emergency communications. The ARA represents the interests of Algerian amateur radio operators before Algerian and international regulatory authorities. The ARA is the national member society representing Algeria in the International Amateur Radio Union.

In 2013 the organisation celebrated its 50th anniversary.

== See also ==
- International Amateur Radio Union
