= Association of Radio Amateurs of Kosovo =

- Shoqata e Radioamatorëve të Kosovës
- Abbreviation: SHRAK
- Formation: 2000
- Type: Non-profit organization
- Headquarters: Pristina, Kosovo
- Region served: Kosovo
- President: Vjollca Belegu-Caka (Z61VB)
- Website: www.shrak.org

The Association of Radio Amateurs of Kosovo (SHRAK; Albanian: Shoqata e Radioamatorëve të Kosovës) is the national association of amateur radio operators in Kosovo.

== History ==
SHRAK is a non-governmental organization of amateur radio operators in the Republic of Kosovo. As the only amateur radio association in Kosovo, it plays a key role in promoting amateur radio communications and radio-frequency engineering in the country. The association supports its members on technical matters and represents them before national and international authorities and institutions.

Although the association was established in 2000, it was unable to become active immediately due to the lack of an assigned international callsign prefix for Kosovo. In August 2008, the Government of the Republic of Kosovo decided to use the Z6 prefix throughout its territory. Amateur radio transmissions under the Z6 prefix began in September 2012. However, the Z6 callsign series used by Kosovo has not been officially assigned by the International Telecommunication Union (ITU), the United Nations specialized agency responsible for the international coordination of telecommunications.

SHRAK is a member society of the International Amateur Radio Union (IARU Region 1), the international federation of national amateur radio societies, and represents the interests of amateur radio operators in Kosovo.

== See also ==
- International Amateur Radio Union
- Amateur radio
- ITU prefix
