= Savez Radio-Amatera Srbije =

Savez radio-amatera Srbije Amateur Radio Union of Serbia
- Abbreviation: SRS
- Type: Non-profit organization
- Purpose: Advocacy, Education
- Location(s): Belgrade, Serbia KN04ft
- Region served: Serbia
- Official language: Serbian
- President: Mladenović Zoran YU1EW
- Affiliations: International Amateur Radio Union
- Website: www.yu1srs.org.rs

The Savez radio-amatera Srbije (SRS) (in English, Amateur Radio Union of Serbia) is the national non-profit organization for amateur radio enthusiasts in Serbia. Key membership benefits of SRS include the sponsorship of amateur radio operating awards and radio contests, and a QSL bureau for those members who regularly communicate with amateur radio operators in other countries. SRS represents the interests of Serbian amateur radio operators before national, European, and international telecommunications regulatory authorities. SRS is the national member society representing Serbia in the International Amateur Radio Union.

List of SRS members, with their published info such as QTH locator, photo, etc. can be queried at YU Callbook.

== See also ==
- International Amateur Radio Union
