= Asociația Radioamatorilor din Moldova =

Asociația Radioamatorilor din Moldova Amateur Radio Society of Moldova
- Abbreviation: ARM
- Type: Non-profit organization
- Purpose: Advocacy, Education
- Location(s): Chişinău, Moldova; KN47ka
- Region served: Moldova
- Official language: Romanian
- President: Alexey Borets ER1FF
- Affiliations: International Amateur Radio Union
- Website: http://www.arm.md/

Asociația Radioamatorilor din Moldova (ARM) (in English, Amateur Radio Society of Moldova) is a national non-profit organization for amateur radio enthusiasts in Moldova. Key membership benefits of ARM include the sponsorship of amateur radio operating awards and radio contests, and a QSL bureau for those members who regularly communicate with amateur radio operators in other countries. ARM represents the interests of Moldovan amateur radio operators before Moldovan, European, and international telecommunications regulatory authorities. ARM is the national member society representing Moldova in the International Amateur Radio Union.
