= Federacion de Radioaficionados de Cuba =

Federacion de Radioaficionados de Cuba Cuban Amateur Radio Federation
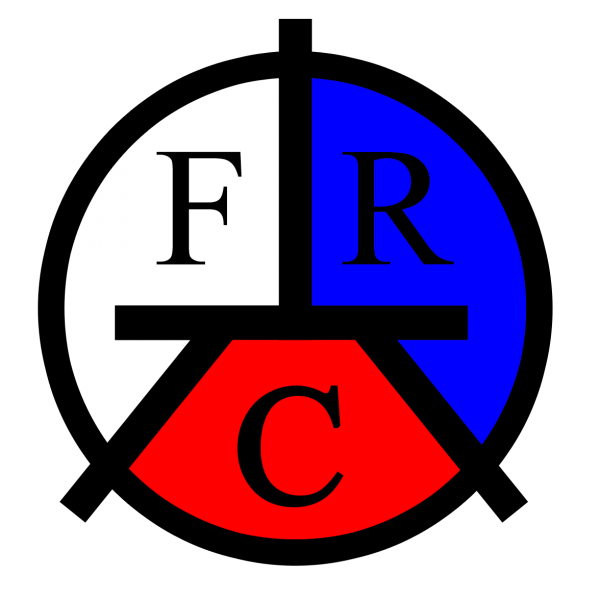
- Abbreviation: FRC
- Type: Non-profit organization
- Purpose: Advocacy, Education
- Headquarters: Havana, Cuba; EL83td
- Region served: Cuba
- Members: 3,000
- Official language: Spanish
- President: Reniel Horta Morejón (CO2RCH)
- Affiliations: International Amateur Radio Union
- Website: https://www.frcuba.cu/

The Federacion de Radioaficionados de Cuba (FRC) (in English, Cuban Amateur Radio Federation) is a national non-profit organization for amateur radio enthusiasts in Cuba. The FRC claims that 100% of all Cuban amateur radio operators belong to the organization. These members are organized in 180 local amateur radio clubs that are affiliated with the Federacion de Radioaficionados de Cuba. Key membership benefits of FRC include a QSL bureau for those amateur radio operators in regular communications with other amateur radio operators in foreign countries and sponsorship of amateur radio operating awards and radio contests. FRC acts as a liaison between Cuban amateur radio operators and Cuban regulatory authorities. FRC is the national member society representing Cuba in the International Amateur Radio Union.

== Gallery ==
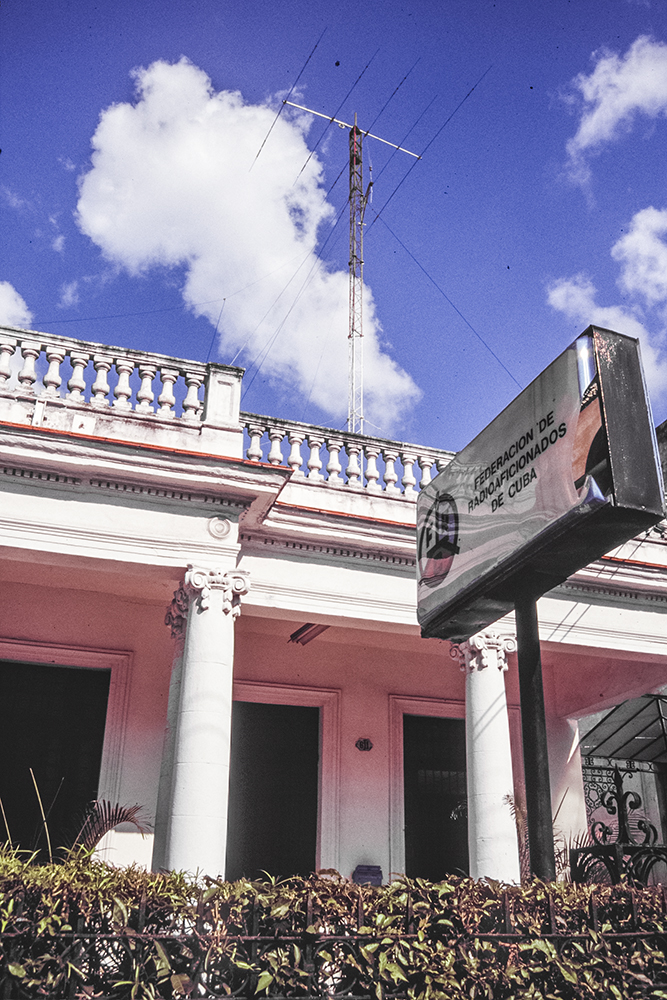
The building of Federacion de Radioaficionados de Cuba in Habana.

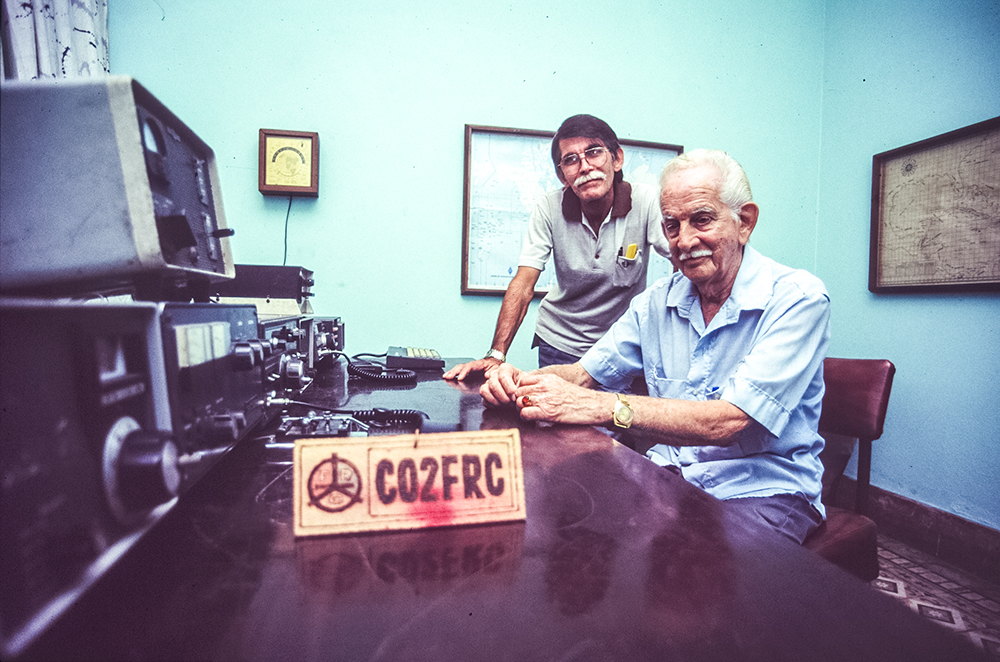
Headquarters radio station at Federacion de Radioaficionados de Cuba in Habana. Oscar Morales Jr. CO2OJ (standing) and Oscar Morales, CO2OM (SK) sitting.

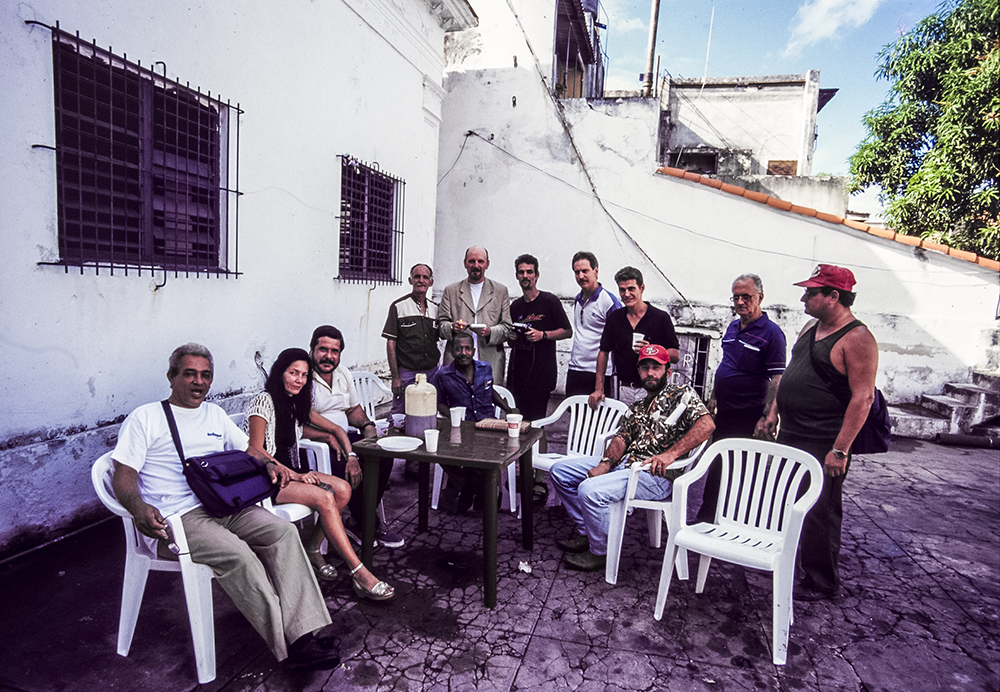
A gathering of Cuban radio amateus at the headquarters of Federacion de Radioaficionados de Cuba.
