= Kazakhstan Federation of Radiosport and Radio Amateur =

Kazakhstan Federation of Radiosport and Radio Amateur Qazaqstannyñ Radiosport jäne Radioäuesqoi Federatsiiasy
- Abbreviation: KFRR, ҚРРФ, КФРР
- Type: Non-profit organization
- Purpose: Advocacy, Education
- Location(s): Nur-Sultan, Kazakhstan; MO51sd
- Region served: Kazakhstan
- Official language: Kazakh, Russian
- Presidium Chairman: Seitkul Assaubay UN7BM
- Affiliations: International Amateur Radio Union
- Website: https://kfrr.kz/

The Kazakhstan Federation of Radiosport and Radio Amateur (Kazakh: Қазақстанның Радиоспорт және Радиоәуесқой Федерациясы, romanized: Qazaqstannyñ Radiosport jäne Radioäuesqoi Federatsiiasy; Russian: Казахстанская Федерация Радиоспорта и Радиолюбительства) is a national non-profit organization for amateur radio enthusiasts in Kazakhstan. KFRR promotes amateur radio in Kazakhstan by sponsoring amateur radio operating awards and radio contests. The KFRR organizes and supports Amateur Radio Direction Finding competitions and the Kazakhstan national ARDF team. The KFRR also represents the interests of Kazakhstan amateur radio operators before Kazakhstan and international telecommunications regulatory authorities. KFRR is the national member society representing Kazakhstan in the International Amateur Radio Union, which it joined on February 10, 2009.
