= Club de Radioexperimentadores de Nicaragua =

Club de Radio-Experimentadores de Nicaragua Nicaraguan Radio Experimenters Club
- Abbreviation: CREN
- Formation: September 15, 1945
- Type: Non-profit organization
- Purpose: Advocacy, Education
- Headquarters: Managua, Nicaragua; EK62ud
- Region served: Nicaragua
- Members: 200
- Official language: Spanish
- President: Juan de la Cruz Rodriguez YN1J
- Affiliations: International Amateur Radio Union
- Website: http://www.cren.8m.net/

The Club de Radio-Experimentadores de Nicaragua (CREN) (in English, Nicaraguan Radio Experimenters Club) is a national non-profit organization for amateur radio enthusiasts in Nicaragua. Key membership benefits of the CREN include a QSL bureau for those amateur radio operators in regular communications with other amateur radio operators in foreign countries, and a network to support amateur radio emergency communications. CREN represents the interests of Nicaraguan amateur radio operators before Nicaraguan and international regulatory authorities. CREN is the national member society representing Nicaragua in the International Amateur Radio Union.

== See also ==
- International Amateur Radio Union
