= Radio Society of Sri Lanka =

- Abbreviation: RSSL
- Formation: July 1, 1950
- Type: Non-profit organization
- Purpose: Advocacy, Education
- Location(s): Colombo, Sri Lanka MJ96wv
- Region served: Sri Lanka
- Official language: English
- Affiliations: International Amateur Radio Union
- Website: https://rssl.lk/

The Radio Society of Sri Lanka (RSSL) is a non-profit organization for amateur radio enthusiasts in Sri Lanka. RSSL was founded on July 1, 1950 as the Radio Society of Ceylon by amateur radio operators, most of whom had originally been licensed under the authority of the British colonial administration. The organization would formally change its name to Radio Society of Sri Lanka in 1974, two years after the official name change of the country. RSSL operates a QSL bureau for those amateur radio operators in regular contact with amateur radio operators in other countries, and supports amateur radio operating awards and radio contests. The Radio Society of Sri Lanka represents the interests of Sri Lankan amateur radio operators before national and international regulatory authorities. RSSL is the only member society representing Sri Lanka in the International Amateur Radio Union. The official web site for RSSL is www.rssl.lk.

== See also ==
- Amateur Radio Society of India
