= Montenegrin Amateur Radio Pool =

- Abbreviation: MARP
- Formation: 2008
- Type: Non-profit organization
- Registration no.: 03026850
- Legal status: Active
- Purpose: Amateur Radio
- Location(s): Herceg Novi, Montenegro; JN92gl
- Region served: Montenegro
- Members: 150 (2018)
- Official language: Montenegrin
- President: Tomašević Marko, 4O9TTT
- IARU Liaison: Ranko Boca, 4O3A
- Board of directors: Tomašević Marko (4O9TTT), Radman Andrija (4O1AR), Boca Ranko (4O3A), Grebović Željko (4O3Z), Žarković A. Jurica (4O7JAZ), Sekulović Marko (4O9VIP), Vulić Luka (4O9KOM)
- Main organ: Assembly
- Affiliations: International Amateur Radio Union
- Staff: 10 (2018)
- Website: http://www.marp.org.me/
- Remarks: 4O1HQ

The Montenegrin Amateur Radio Pool (MARP) (in Montenegrin, Mreža za Afirmaciju Radioamaterskog Pokreta) is a national non-profit organization for amateur radio enthusiasts in Montenegro.

MARP represents the interests of Montenegrin amateur radio operators before international telecommunications regulatory authorities. MARP is the national member society representing Montenegro in the International Amateur Radio Union.

== 13th World HST Championship ==
Between 21st and 25 September 2016, MARP was leading organizer of 13th IARU World HST Championship held in Herceg-Novi, Montenegro

HST Championship gathered 148 competitors from 25 countries in 3 continents.

== See also ==
- Amateur radio
- High-speed telegraphy
- International Amateur Radio Union
