= Unió de Radioaficionats Andorrans =

Unió de Radioaficionats Andorrans Andorran Amateur Radio Union
- Abbreviation: URA
- Type: Non-profit organization
- Purpose: Advocacy, Education
- Location(s): Les Escaldes, Andorra JN02sm
- Region served: Andorra
- President: Joan Sauri, C31US
- Affiliations: International Amateur Radio Union
- Website: http://www.ura.ad/

The Unió de Radioaficionats Andorrans (URA) (in English, Andorran Amateur Radio Union) is a national non-profit organization for amateur radio enthusiasts in Andorra. URA operates a QSL bureau for those members who regularly communicate with amateur radio operators in other countries. URA represents the interests of Andorran amateur radio operators and shortwave listeners before Andorran and international telecommunications regulatory authorities. URA is the national member society representing Andorra in the International Amateur Radio Union.

== See also ==
- International Amateur Radio Union
