= Radio Club de Chile =

Chilean non-profit organization for amateur radio

- Abbreviation: RCCH
- Formation: 1922
- Type: Non-profit organization
- Purpose: Advocacy, Education
- Location(s): Santiago, Chile FF46qm
- Region served: Chile
- Official language: Spanish
- President: Cristian Alvarez - CE3BKN
- Affiliations: International Amateur Radio Union
- Website: http://www.ce3aa.cl/

The Radio Club de Chile (RCCH) is a national non-profit organization for amateur radio enthusiasts in Chile. Key membership benefits of RCCH include the sponsorship of amateur radio operating awards and radio contests, and a QSL bureau for those members who regularly communicate with amateur radio operators in other countries. RCCH represents the interests of Chilean amateur radio operators before Chilean and international telecommunications regulatory authorities. RCCH is the national member society representing Chile in the International Amateur Radio Union.

== See also ==
- International Amateur Radio Union
