= Bulgarian Federation of Radio Amateurs =

Българската федерация на радиолюбителите Bulgarian Federation of Radio Amateurs
- Abbreviation: BFRA
- Type: Non-profit organization
- Purpose: Advocacy, Education
- Location(s): Sofia, Bulgaria; KN12pq
- Region served: Bulgaria
- Official language: Bulgarian
- President: Viktor Cenkov LZ3NN
- Affiliations: International Amateur Radio Union
- Website: http://www.bfra.org/

The Bulgarian Federation of Radio Amateurs (BFRA; Bulgarian: Българската федерация на радиолюбителите) is a national non-profit organization for amateur radio enthusiasts in Bulgaria.

Key membership benefits of the BFRA include the sponsorship of amateur radio operating awards, radio contests, and a QSL bureau for members who regularly communicate with amateur radio operators in other countries. BFRA represents the interests of Bulgarian amateur radio operators before Bulgarian and international telecommunications regulatory authorities.

BFRA is the national member society representing Bulgaria in the International Amateur Radio Union. BFRA was the host organization for the 2006 Amateur Radio Direction Finding World Championships.

== See also ==
- International Amateur Radio Union
