= Radio Club de Costa Rica =

Non-profit amateur radio organization

Radio Club de Costa Rica Radio Club of Costa Rica
- Abbreviation: RCCR
- Founded: 1953
- Type: Non-profit organization
- Purpose: Advocacy, Education
- Headquarters: San José, Costa Rica; EJ79xw
- Region served: Costa Rica
- Official language: Spanish
- President: Hugo Soto Vargas TI2HAS
- Affiliations: International Amateur Radio Union
- Website: https://ti0rc.org

The Radio Club de Costa Rica (RCCR) (in English: Radio Club of Costa Rica) is a national non-profit organization for amateur radio enthusiasts in Costa Rica. Key membership benefits of the RCCR include a QSL bureau for those amateur radio operators in regular communications with other amateur radio operators in foreign countries, and a network to support amateur radio emergency communications. RCCR represents the interests of Costa Rican amateur radio operators before Costa Rican and international regulatory authorities. RCCR is the national member society representing Costa Rica in the International Amateur Radio Union.

== See also ==
- International Amateur Radio Union
