= Slovenský Zväz Rádioamatérov =

Slovenský Zväz Rádioamatérov Slovak Amateur Radio Association
- Abbreviation: SZR
- Formation: 1990
- Type: Non-profit organization
- Purpose: Advocacy, Education
- Location(s): Bratislava, Slovakia JN88mg
- Region served: Slovakia
- Official language: Slovak
- President: Roman Kudlac OM3EI
- Affiliations: International Amateur Radio Union
- Website: http://www.szr.sk/

The Slovenský Zväz Rádioamatérov (SZR) (in English, Slovak Amateur Radio Association) is a national non-profit organization for amateur radio enthusiasts in Slovakia. Key membership benefits of the SZR include the sponsorship of amateur radio operating awards, radio contests, and a QSL bureau for members who regularly communicate with amateur radio operators in other countries. SZR represents the interests amateur Slovak radio operators before Slovak and international telecommunications regulatory authorities. SZR also supports local competitions in Amateur Radio Direction Finding as well as a national team that travels to regional and world championship events. SZR publishes a membership magazine called Rádiožurnál SZR. SZR is the national member society representing the Slovak Republic in the International Amateur Radio Union.
