= Lesotho Amateur Radio Society =

- Abbreviation: LARS
- Type: Non-profit organization
- Purpose: Advocacy, Education
- Location(s): Maseru, Lesotho; KG30rq
- Region served: Lesotho
- President: Leon Tromp
- Affiliations: International Amateur Radio Union
- Website: https://www.qsl.net/7p8ms/

The Lesotho Amateur Radio Society (LARS) is a national non-profit organization for amateur radio enthusiasts in Lesotho. LARS operates a QSL bureau for those members who regularly communicate with amateur radio operators in other countries, and offers radio equipment to its members for their use. LARS represents the interests of Lesotho amateur radio operators and shortwave listeners before Lesotho and international telecommunications regulatory authorities. LARS is the national member society representing Lesotho in the International Amateur Radio Union.

== See also ==
- International Amateur Radio Union
