= Club de Radioaficionados de Guatemala =

Non-profit organization

Club de Radioaficionados de Guatemala Guatemala Amateur Radio Club
- Abbreviation: CRAG
- Type: Non-profit organization
- Purpose: Advocacy, Education
- Headquarters: Guatemala City, Guatemala; EK44qp
- Region served: Guatemala
- Official language: Spanish
- President: Christian Flores TG9AXF
- Affiliations: International Amateur Radio Union
- Website: www.crag.org.gt

The Club de Radioaficionados de Guatemala (CRAG) (in English, Guatemala Amateur Radio Club) is a national non-profit organization for amateur radio enthusiasts in Guatemala. Key membership benefits of the CRAG include a QSL bureau for those amateur radio operators in regular communications with other amateur radio operators in foreign countries, and a network to support amateur radio emergency communications. CRAG represents the interests of Guatemalan amateur radio operators before Guatemalan and international regulatory authorities. CRAG is the national member society representing Guatemala in the International Amateur Radio Union.
