= Radioamaterski Sojuz na Makedonija =

Radioamateur Society of Macedonia
- Abbreviation: RSM
- Formation: 1946
- Type: Non-profit organization
- Location(s): Skopje, North Macedonia KN01rx
- Region served: North Macedonia
- President: Djoko M. Djordjevic Z35T
- Affiliations: International Amateur Radio Union
- Website: www.z37rsm.org.mk

The Radioamateur Society of Macedonia (RSM) (Macedonian: Радиоаматерски Сојуз на Македонија (РСМ), romanized: Radioamaterski Sojuz na Makedonija (RSM) ) is a national non-profit organization for amateur radio enthusiasts in North Macedonia. Key membership benefits of RSM include the sponsorship of amateur radio operating awards and radio contests, and a QSL bureau for those members who regularly communicate with amateur radio operators in other countries. Radioamateur Society of Macedonia represents the interests of Macedonian amateur radio operators before Macedonian, European, and international telecommunications regulatory authorities. Radioamateur Society of Macedonia is the national member society representing North Macedonia in the International Amateur Radio Union.

== See also ==
- International Amateur Radio Union
