= Réseau Luxembourgeois des Amateurs d'Ondes Courtes =

Radioamateurs du Luxembourg
- Abbreviation: RL
- Type: Non-profit organization
- Purpose: Advocacy, Education
- Location(s): Luxembourg JN39bo
- Region served: Luxembourg
- Official language: Luxembourgish, French, German, English
- President: Mich Friederich LX1KQ
- Affiliations: International Amateur Radio Union
- Website: http://www.rlx.lu/

The Radioamateurs du Luxembourg (RL) (in English, Luxembourg Amateur Radio Society), originally founded in 1937 as Réseau Luxembourgeois des Amateurs d'Ondes Courtes (Luxembourg Network of Shortwave Radio Amateurs), is a national non-profit organization for amateur radio enthusiasts in Luxembourg. RL supports amateur radio operators in Luxembourg by operating the RL QSL Bureau (http://www.qsl.rlx.lu) for those members who regularly communicate with amateur radio operators in other countries, sponsoring amateur radio operating awards and radio contests, and supporting radio propagation beacons in Luxembourg. RL represents the interests of amateur radio operators in Luxembourg before local and international telecommunications regulatory authorities. RL is the national member society representing Luxembourg in the International Amateur Radio Union.

Representatives from Luxembourg were involved in the 1924 call for the International Amateur Congress that founded the IARU in 1925.
