= Association Tunisienne des Radioamateurs =

Tunisian amatueur radio nonprofit

Association Tunisienne des Radio Amateurs
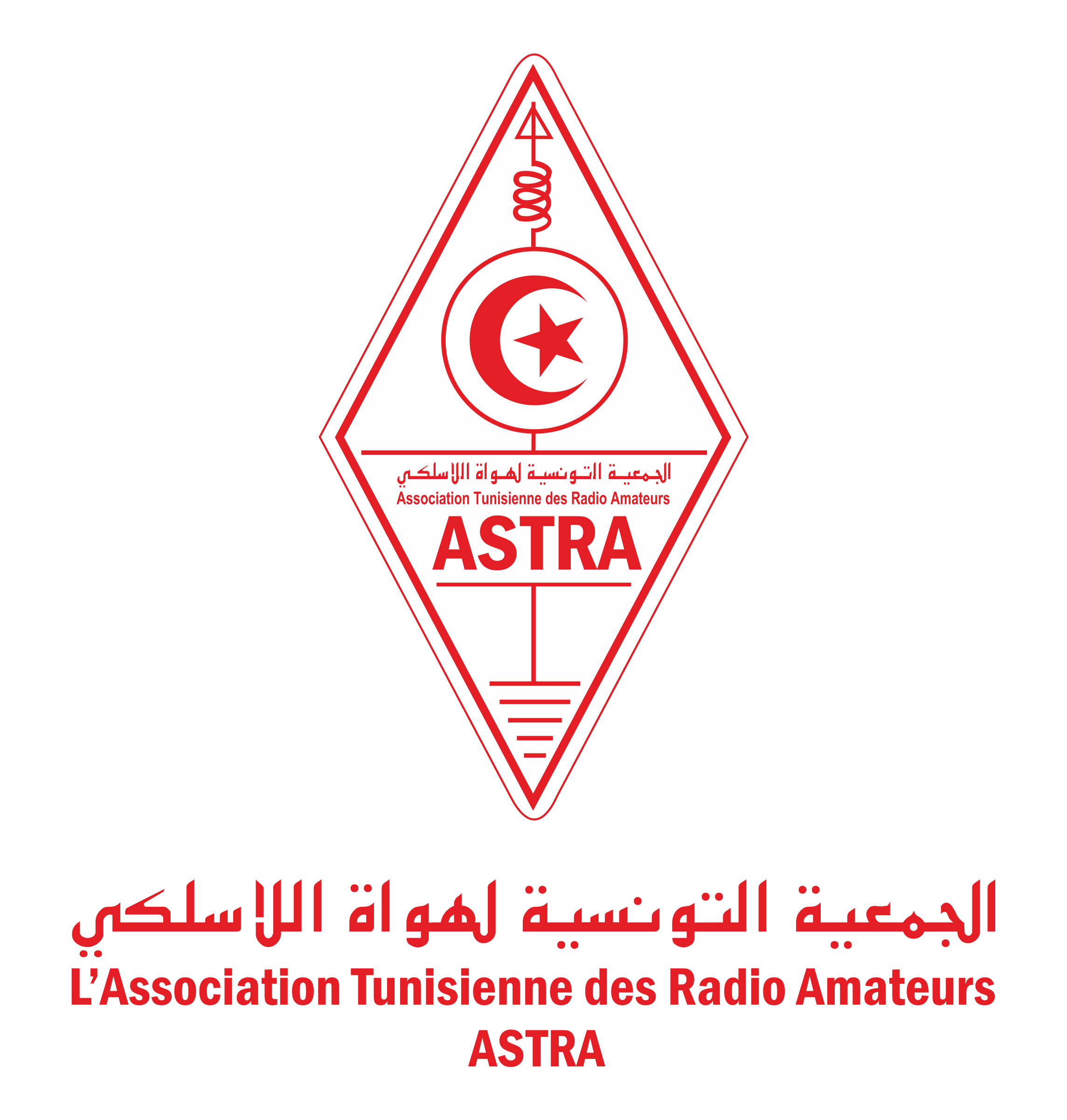
- The Logo of ASTRA
- Abbreviation: ASTRA
- Formation: December 10, 2011
- Type: Non-profit organization
- Legal status: Association
- Purpose: Advocacy, Education
- Headquarters: Bab Mnara, Tunis
- Location(s): Tunis, Tunisia JM56ct
- Region served: Tunisia
- Official language: Arabic
- President: Anis CHABCHOUB
- Affiliations: International Amateur Radio Union
- Website: http://arat.tn/

Tunisian Association of Radio Amateurs, Association Tunisienne des Radio Amateurs (ASTRA) is a scientific nonprofit organization that focuses on the amateur radio activity. This is the first association amateur Tunisia we tried to legally based dice 1997, as recently recognized by the Tunisian government end as shown in the article published in the Official Journal of the Tunisian Republic.

December 10, 2011, commemorating the World Declaration of Human Rights, as radio amateurs have returned their full rights to organize and have their own association thanks to the Tunisian civil revolution and its martyrs. The ASTRA is officially recognized as an association representing Tunisia at the International Amateur Radio Union -IARU- since 1998 as indicated in Circular No. 175 of October 12, 1998.

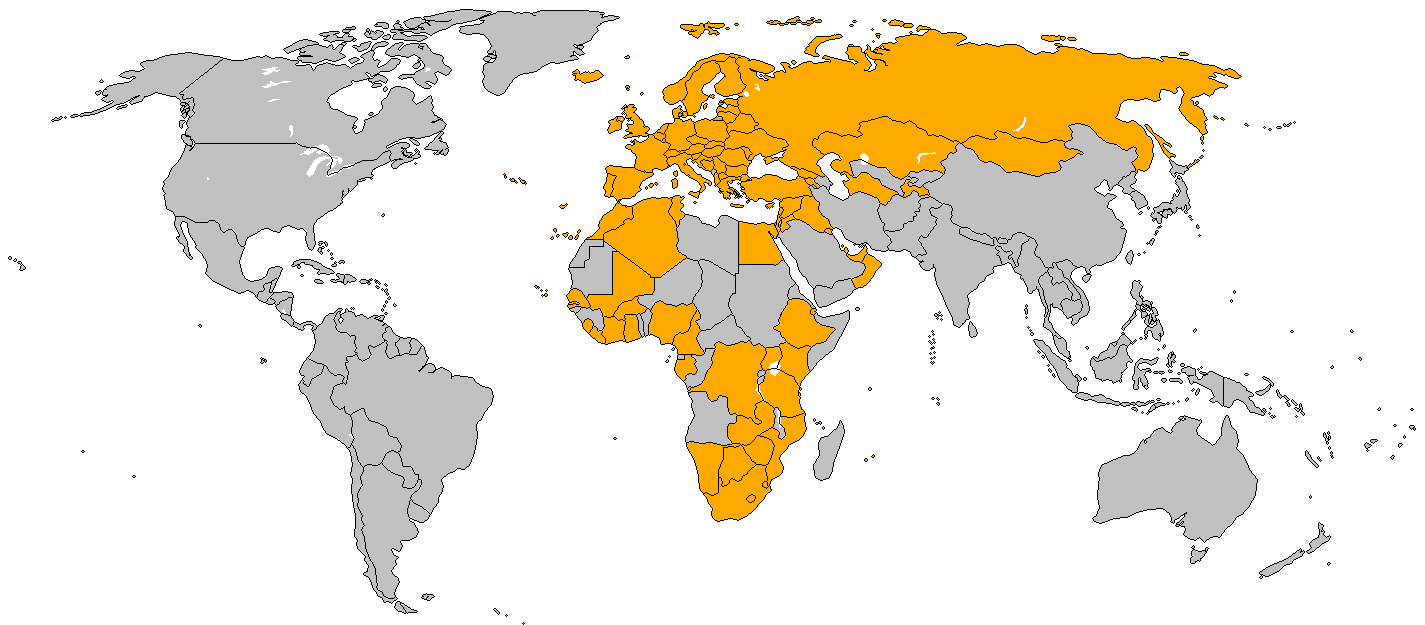
IARU Region 1 Member Societies

== Goals ==
The ASTRA goals are:

- Disseminate and support the Amateur Radio to provide national expertise in radio communications with self-training.
- Organize the field of Amateur Radio in Tunisia in the interest of the national community.
- Provide the equipment and expertise to ensure communications during emergency.
- Represent and defend the interests of amateur radio with organizations, institutions and authorities at National, Regional and International levels.
- Contribute to the development of scientific and technological research in the field of telecommunications and radio in particular.
- Strengthen friendly relations between amateur radio, which will contribute to the strengthening of relations between people and the dissemination of the values of peace in its humanitarian dimensions.
- Introduce the cultural heritage and wealth of the Tunisian culture.
