= Radio Club Argentino =

Organization

- Abbreviation: RCA
- Formation: October 21, 1921
- Type: Non-profit organization
- Purpose: Advocacy, Education
- Location(s): Buenos Aires, Argentina GF05ti
- Region served: Argentina
- Official language: Spanish
- President: Juan I. Recabeitia LU8ARI
- Affiliations: International Amateur Radio Union
- Website: http://www.lu4aa.org/

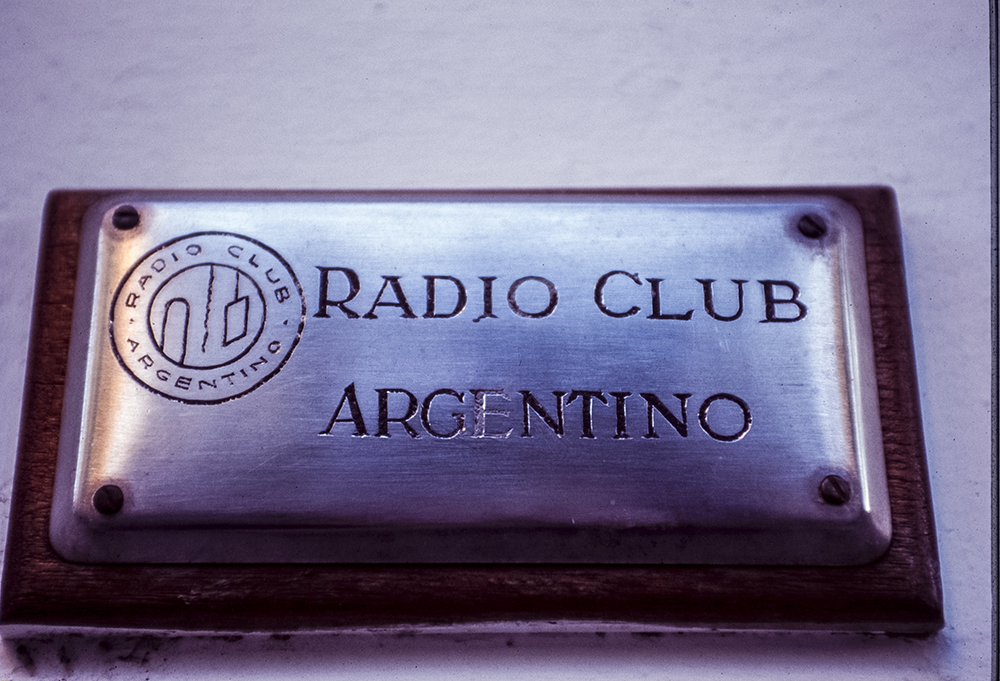
The entrance plaque at the site of the Radio Club of Argentina in Buenos Aires,

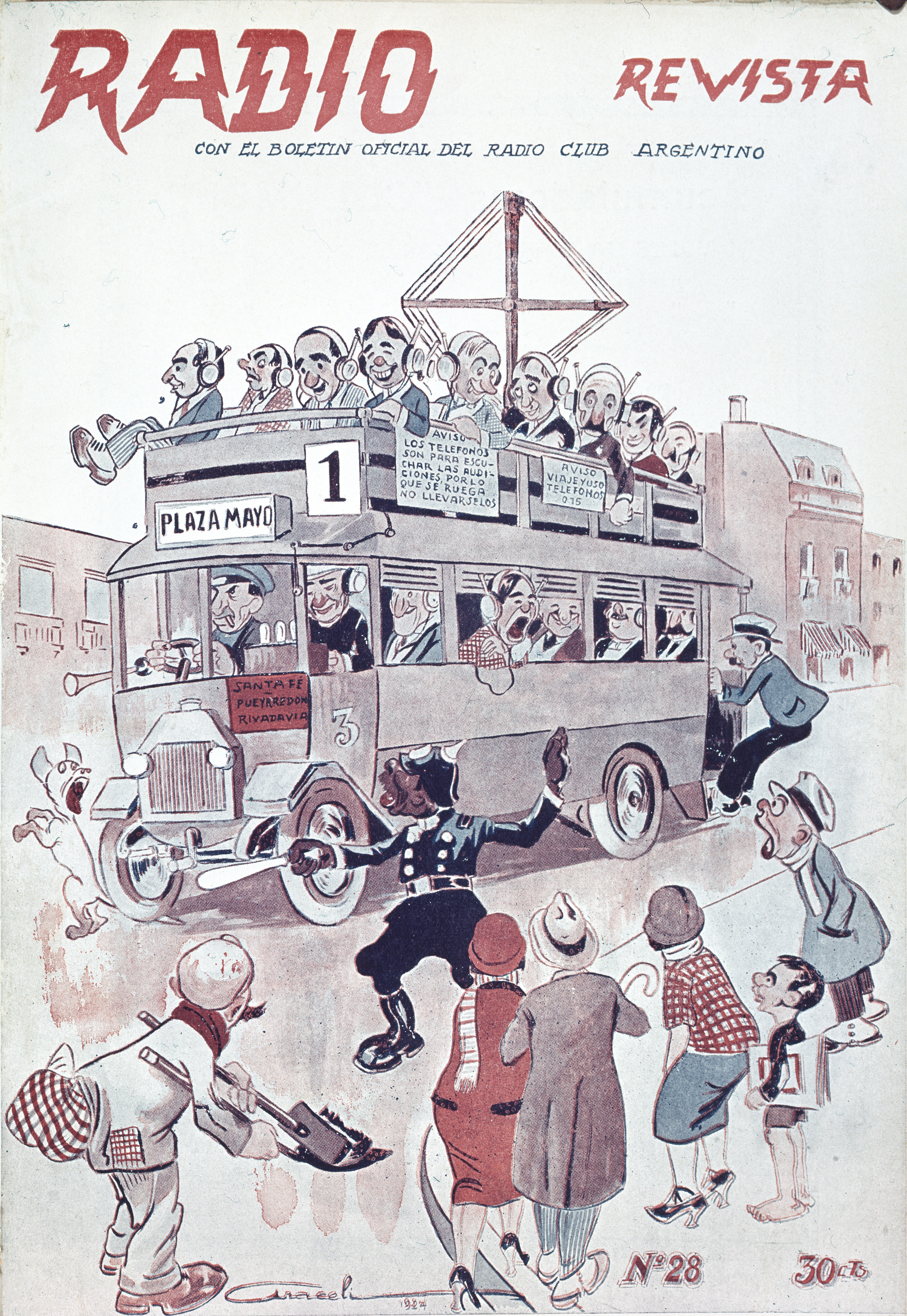
Cover of the magazine Radio revista, n°28

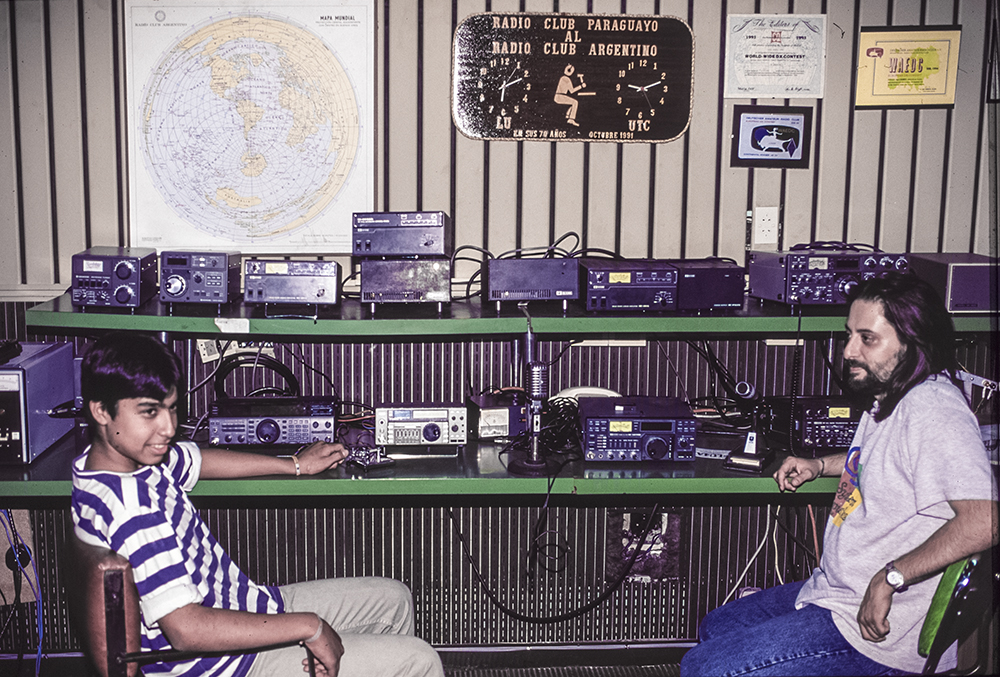
Headquarters station of the Radio Club Argentino in Buenos Aires, call sign LU4AA.

The Radio Club Argentino (RCA) (in English, literally Argentine Radio Club) is a national nonprofit organization for amateur radio enthusiasts in Argentina. RCA was founded in Buenos Aires on October 21, 1921. Key membership benefits in the organization include the use of a QSL bureau for those amateur radio operators in regular contact with amateur radio operators in other countries, a group insurance policy, and a quarterly membership journal called Revista del Radio Club Argentino. The Radio Club Argentino represents the interests of Argentine amateur radio operators before Argentine and international regulatory authorities. It is also the national member society representing Argentina in the International Amateur Radio Union.

== See also ==
- International Amateur Radio Union
