= Radio Amateur Society of Thailand =

National non-profit organization for amateur radio enthusiasts in Thailand

สมาคมวิทยุสมัครเล่นแห่งประเทศไทย ในพระบรมราชุปถัมภ์ Radio Amateur Society of Thailand under The Royal Patronage of His Majesty The King
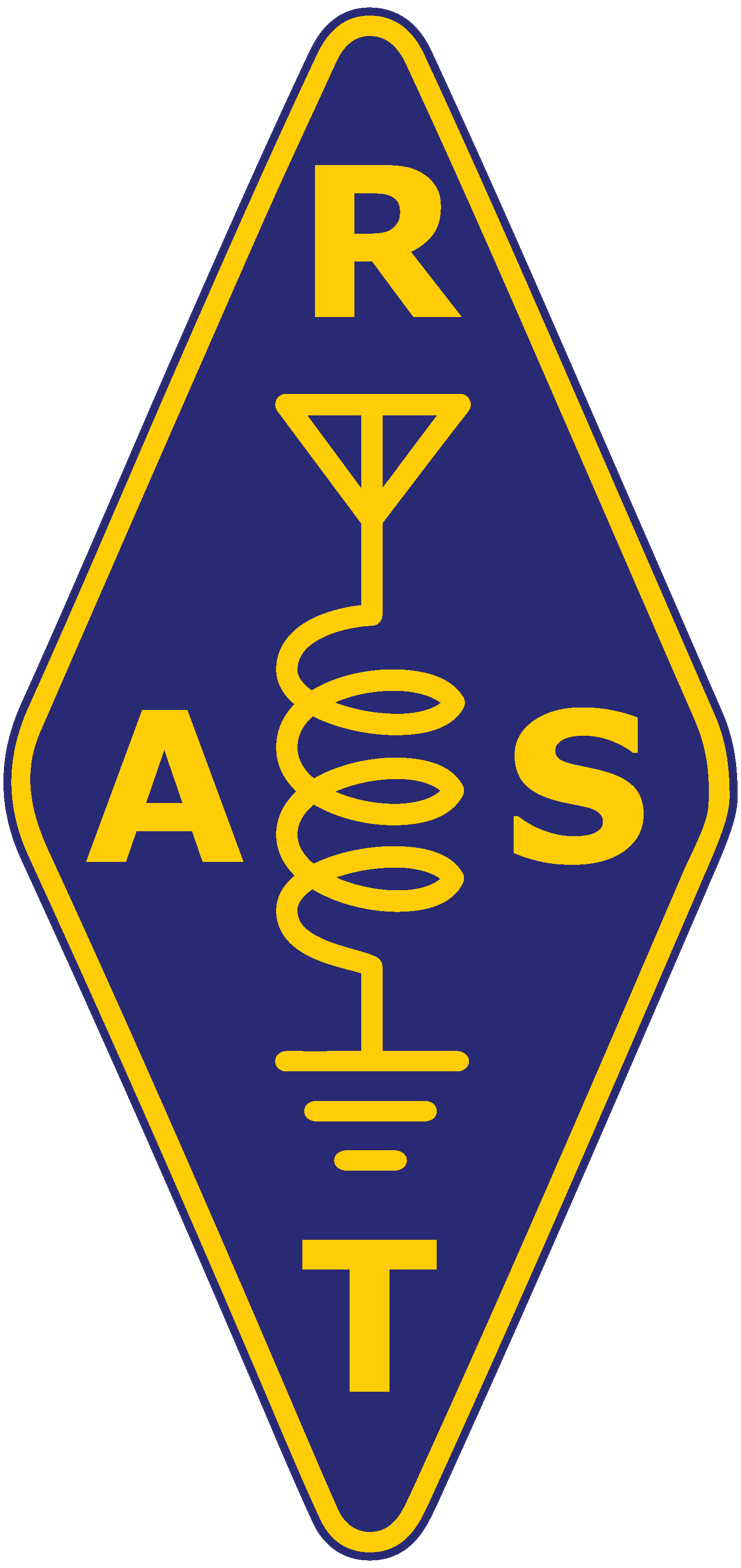
- Abbreviation: RAST
- Formation: August 22, 1963
- Type: Non-profit organization
- Location(s): Bangkok, Thailand OK04hb
- Region served: Thailand
- Official language: Thai
- President: Jakkree Hangtongkom HS1FVL
- Affiliations: International Amateur Radio Union
- Website: http://www.rast.or.th/

The Radio Amateur Society of Thailand under The Royal Patronage of His Majesty The King (RAST) (Thai: สมาคมวิทยุสมัครเล่นแห่งประเทศไทย ในพระบรมราชุปถัมภ์) is a national non-profit organization for amateur radio enthusiasts in Thailand. The organization is founded under the royal patronage of the King of Thailand, and qualifies as a charitable entity pursuant to a Thai Ministry of Finance declaration. The organization was founded on August 22, 1963, by a group of amateur radio operators who met at a restaurant in Bangkok. Among the first orders of business was to address official objections to the communications of radio amateurs in Thailand with amateur radio operators in other countries. The RAST represents the interests of Thai amateur radio operators and shortwave listeners before Thai and international telecommunications regulatory authorities. RAST is the national member society representing Thailand in the International Amateur Radio Union.

Amateur "ham" radio operations in Thailand are permitted via an examination in the Thai language for Thai nationals OR via a reciprocal awarding of a Thailand license based on the presentation of a valid license from a few other countries (the list includes USA and is expanding; the latest list is in the licensing section of the RAST website). Each reciprocal agreement must be arranged via treaty between Thailand and other nations. Licenses have a five-year term, renewable. The international assigned prefixes for ham call letters in Thailand are HS and E2; numbers and letters are added behind these letters to identify each individual licensee or radio club (example: HS0AC and E20AAA). There are about 300,000 licensed operators in Thailand, but only a few tens of operators are active on the HF frequencies; the others use the 2 meter band.

RAST usually holds monthly member meetings on the first Sunday of each month in a Bangkok venue, the Sena Place Hotel. During the pandemic, meetings have been less frequent and at different locations. Guests are welcome. Officers and board members are elected regularly and hold two year terms.

Membership to RAST costs 300 Baht plus 200 Baht per year to renew; alternatively it costs 2,100 Baht for lifetime membership, and there is a "gold" lifetime membership for 5,000 Baht. Membership is open to anyone.

== See also ==
- International Amateur Radio Union
