= Association of Radio Amateurs of Slovenia =

Amateur radio association

Zveza radioamaterjev Slovenije Association of Radio Amateurs of Slovenia
- Abbreviation: ZRS
- Type: Non-profit organization
- Purpose: Advocacy, education
- Location(s): Ljubljana, Slovenia; JN76tm
- Region served: Slovenia
- Official language: Slovene
- President: Bojan Majhenič S52ME
- Affiliations: International Amateur Radio Union
- Website: http://www.hamradio.si/

The Association of Radio Amateurs of Slovenia (Slovene: Zveza radioamaterjev Slovenije, acronym ZRS) is the national non-profit organization for amateur radio enthusiasts in Slovenia.

== Overview ==
Key membership benefits of ZRS include the sponsorship of amateur radio operating awards and radio contests. ZRS also supports local competitions in Amateur Radio Direction Finding as well as a national team that travels to regional and world championship events. ZRS represents the interests of Slovenian amateur radio operators before Slovenian and international telecommunications regulatory authorities. ZRS also publishes a membership magazine called CQ ZRS.

ZRS was the sponsoring organization for the 2000 World Radiosport Team Championships held in Ljubljana. ZRS is the national member society representing Slovenia in the International Amateur Radio Union.

== See also ==
- International Amateur Radio Union
