= Club de Radio Aficionados de El Salvador =

Club de Radio Aficionados de El Salvador El Salvador Amateur Radio Club
- Abbreviation: CRAS
- Type: Non-profit organization
- Purpose: Advocacy, Education
- Headquarters: San Salvador, El Salvador; EK53jq
- Region served: El Salvador
- Official language: Spanish
- President: Jose Arturo Molina YS1MS
- Affiliations: International Amateur Radio Union
- Website: https://ys1ys.org/

The Club de Radio Aficionados de El Salvador (CRAS) (n English, El Salvador Amateur Radio Club) is a national non-profit organization for amateur radio enthusiasts in El Salvador. Key membership benefits of the CRAS include a QSL bureau for those amateur radio operators in regular communications with other amateur radio operators in foreign countries, and a network to support amateur radio emergency communications. CRAS represents the interests of El Salvadoran amateur radio operators before El Salvadoran and international regulatory authorities. CRAS is the national member society representing El Salvador in the International Amateur Radio Union.

== See also ==
- International Amateur Radio Union
