= Malta Amateur Radio League =

- Abbreviation: MARL
- Formation: 1922
- Type: Non-profit organization
- Purpose: Advocacy, Education
- Headquarters: Attard, Malta
- Region served: Malta
- President: Emmanuel Grech 9H1GW
- Affiliations: International Amateur Radio Union
- Website: http://www.9h1mrl.org/

The Malta Amateur Radio League (MARL) is a non-profit organization for amateur radio enthusiasts in Malta. Since MARL was established in 1922, its aim has been to bring together people interested in amateur radio and electronics, and to discuss and defend amateur radio matters and opinions with local government authorities. MARL provides educational facilities for members with an interest in amateur radio and electronics, and also operates an equipped amateur radio station. MARL is the Maltese national radio society member of the International Amateur Radio Union.

MARL offers weekly courses in preparation for Amateur Radio Examination needed to obtain a Class B licence, and Morse Code Test needed to upgrade to a Class A licence.

The QSL card bureau was handed over to the Malta Amateur Radio League in 1973. MARL manages all incoming and outgoing QSL cards for the Maltese Islands.

The club used to publish a free quarterly newsletter in Maltese and English. The MARL clubhouse is equipped to operate on most amateur radio bands from its club station, and the group organises various field days and activities throughout the year to promote and advance amateur radio.

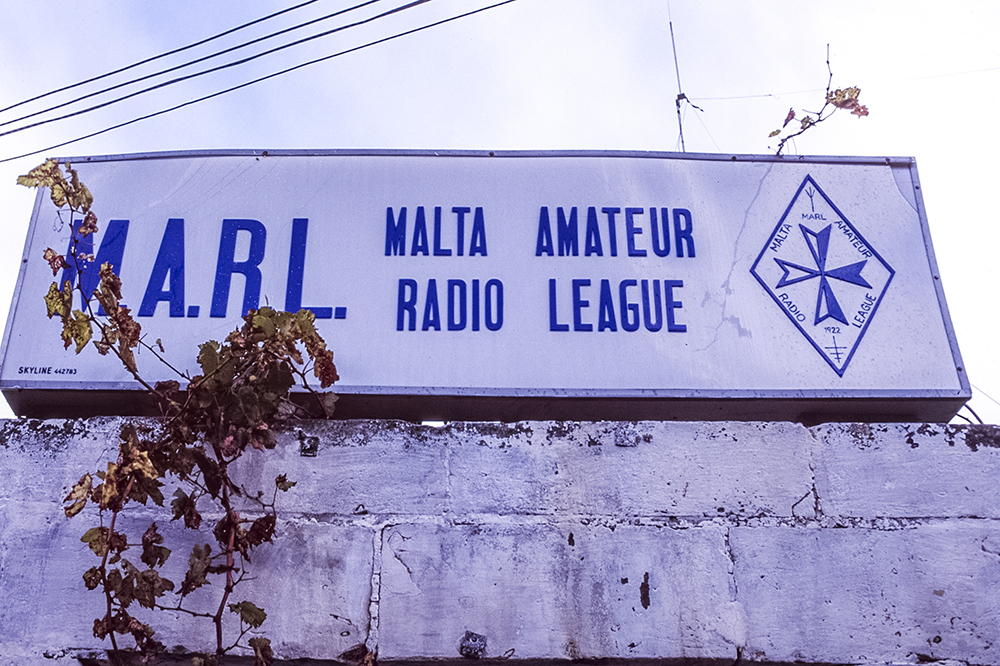
The sign at the entrance to the headquarters of Malta Amateur Radio League

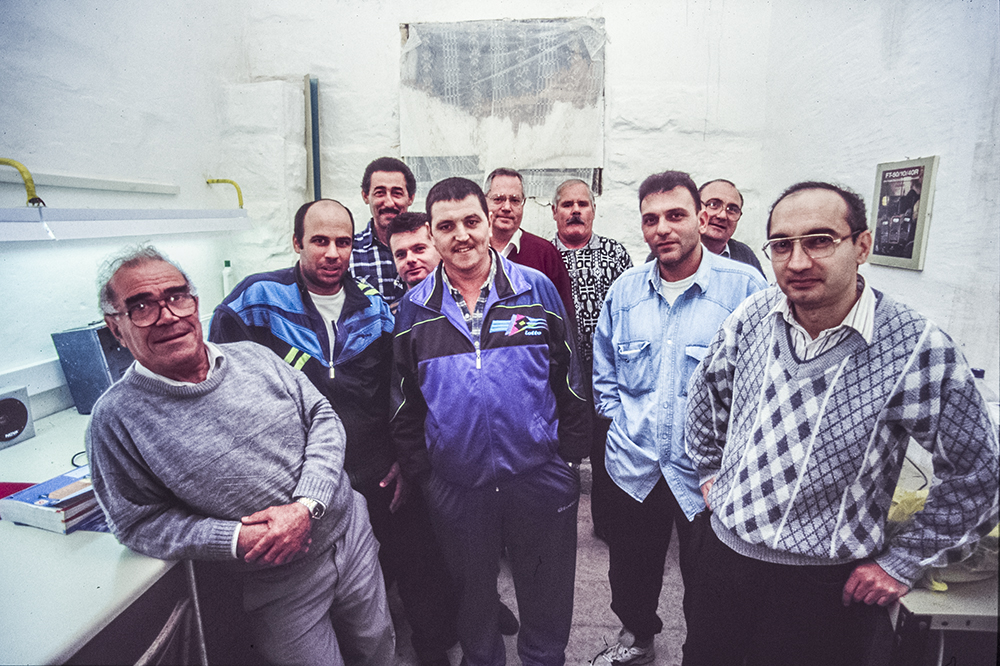
A group of radio amateurs at the headquarters of the Malta Amateur Radio League,

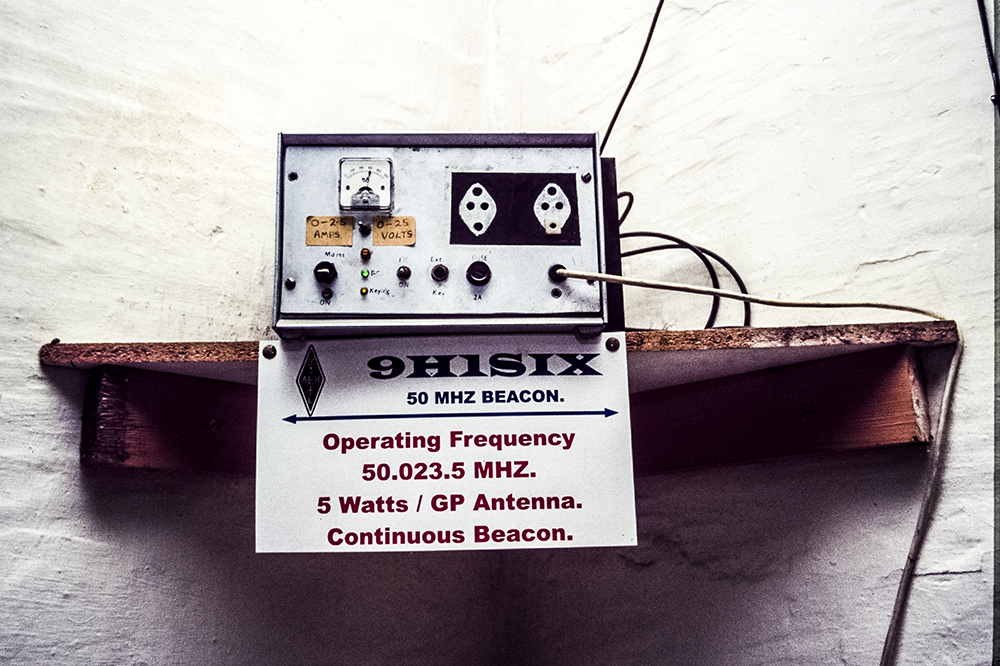
The radio beacon at the headquarters of the Malta Amateur Radio League

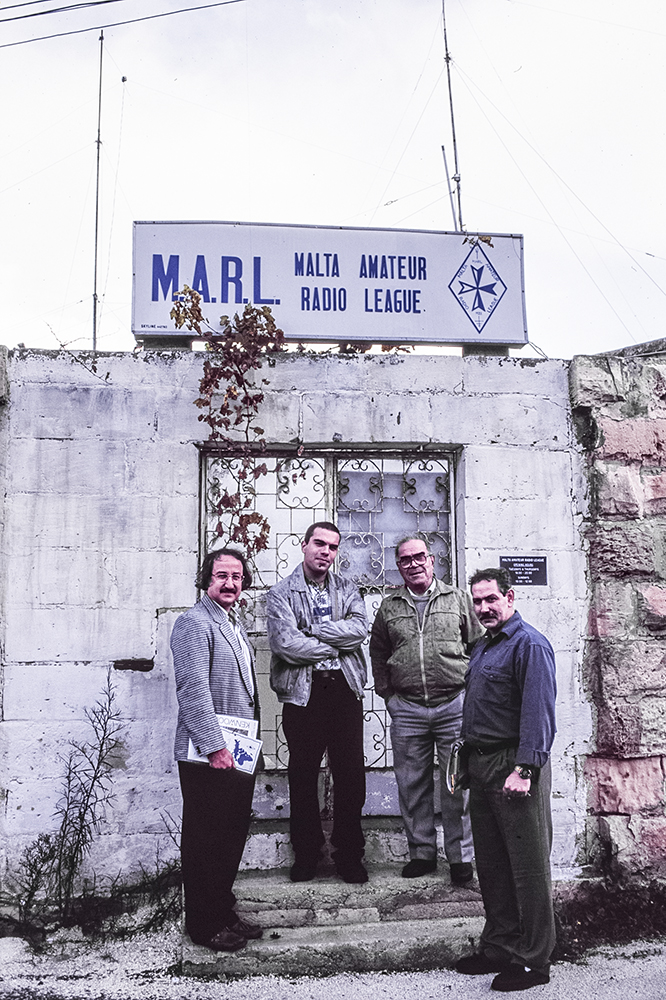
Entrance to the headquarters of Malta Amateur Radio League in Attard. Malta,
