= Réseau des Émetteurs Français =

French association

- Abbreviation: REF
- Formation: April 1925
- Type: Non-profit organization
- Purpose: Advocacy, Education
- Location(s): Tours, France; JN07ik
- Region served: France
- Official language: French
- President: Norman Hubert F4HXK
- Affiliations: International Amateur Radio Union
- Website: http://www.r-e-f.org/

The Réseau des Émetteurs Français (REF) (in English, literally "Network of French Radio Transmitters") is a national non-profit organization for amateur radio enthusiasts in France. Key membership benefits of the organization include QSL bureau services, a monthly membership magazine called Radio REF, and the promotion and sponsorship of radio contests and operating awards. REF promotes amateur radio by organizing classes and technical support to help enthusiasts earn their amateur radio license. The REF-Union also represents the interests of French amateur radio operators and shortwave listeners before French and international telecommunications regulatory authorities. REF is the national member society representing France in the International Amateur Radio Union.

== See also ==
- International Amateur Radio Union
