= Latvijas Radio Amatieru Līga =

Latvijas Radioamatieru Līga Latvian Amateur Radio League
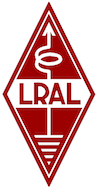
- Abbreviation: LRAL
- Type: Non-profit organization
- Purpose: Advocacy, education
- Location(s): Riga, Latvia; KO26bw
- Region served: Latvia
- Official language: Latvian
- Chairman: Arvis Soldāns (YL3MS)
- Affiliations: International Amateur Radio Union
- Website: http://www.lral.lv/

The Latvijas Radioamatieru Līga (LRAL) (in English, Latvian Amateur Radio League) is a national non-profit organization for amateur radio enthusiasts in Latvia. Key membership benefits of LRAL include the sponsorship of amateur radio operating awards and radio contests, and a QSL bureau for those members who regularly communicate with amateur radio operators in other countries. LRAL represents the interests of Latvian amateur radio operators before Latvian, European, and international telecommunications regulatory authorities. LRAL is the national member society representing Latvia in the International Amateur Radio Union.

== See also ==
- International Amateur Radio Union
