= Radio Club Paraguayo =

Amateur radio organization in Paraguay

Radio Club Paraguayo Radio Club of Paraguay
- Abbreviation: RCP
- Type: Non-profit organization
- Purpose: Advocacy, Education
- Location(s): Asunción, Paraguay GG14er
- Region served: Paraguay
- Official language: Spanish
- President: Carlos Mereles Somers ZP5MSC
- Affiliations: International Amateur Radio Union
- Website: Official website

The Radio Club Paraguayo (RCP; lit. 'Radio Club of Paraguay') is a national non-profit organization for amateur radio enthusiasts in Paraguay. The RCP operates a QSL bureau for those amateur radio operators in regular contact with amateur radio operators in other countries, and supports amateur radio operating awards and radio contests. Radio Club Paraguayo represents the interests of Paraguayan amateur radio operators before national and international regulatory authorities. RCP is the national member society representing Paraguay in the International Amateur Radio Union.

== See also ==
- International Amateur Radio Union
