= Rede dos Emissores Portugueses =

- Abbreviation: REP
- Formation: 1926
- Type: Non-profit organization
- Purpose: Advocacy, Education
- Headquarters: Lisbon, Portugal; IM58js
- Region served: Portugal
- Official language: Portuguese
- President: Jose Carlos B. Nora CT1END
- Affiliations: International Amateur Radio Union
- Website: http://www.rep.pt/

The Rede dos Emissores Portugueses (REP) (n English, Network of Portuguese Transmitters) is a national non-profit organization for amateur radio enthusiasts in Portugal. REP was founded in 1926 by Eugenio de Avillez P1AE, an early Portuguese radio experimenter. Key membership benefits of the REP include a QSL bureau for those amateur radio operators in regular communications with other amateur radio operators in foreign countries, and the sponsorship of amateur radio operating awards and radio contests. The REP represents the interests of Portuguese amateur radio operators before Portuguese and international regulatory authorities. REP is the national member society representing Portugal in the International Amateur Radio Union, which it joined in 1931.

== See also ==
- International Amateur Radio Union
