= Korean Amateur Radio League =

South Korean organization

한국아마추어무선연맹 Korean Amateur Radio League
- Abbreviation: KARL
- Formation: 1955
- Type: Non-profit organization
- Purpose: Advocacy, Education
- Headquarters: Seoul; PM37ml
- Region served: South Korea
- Official language: Korean
- President: Han Jeong Hoon HL2AGG
- Affiliations: International Amateur Radio Union
- Website: http://www.karl.or.kr/

The Korean Amateur Radio League (KARL) (Korean, 한국아마추어무선연맹) is a non-profit organization for amateur radio enthusiasts in South Korea. KARL was founded in 1955 by Korean radio communication enthusiasts. Due to advocacy efforts of KARL, the first amateur radio station in South Korea, HL2AA is Seoul, was licensed in 1959. KARL is the national member society representing South Korea in the International Amateur Radio Union. KARL was the host society for the 14th World Amateur Radio Direction Finding Championships held in Hwaseong, Gyeonggi, South Korea in September, 2008.

== See also ==
- International Amateur Radio Union
