= Liga de Amadores Brasileiros de Rádio Emissão =

Brazilian non-profit organization

- Abbreviation: LABRE
- Formation: February 2, 1934
- Type: Non-profit organization
- Purpose: Advocacy, Education
- Location(s): Brasília, Brazil; GH64ce
- Region served: Brazil
- Official language: Brazilian Portuguese
- President: Marcone Cerqueira, PY6MV
- Affiliations: International Amateur Radio Union
- Website: https://www.labre.org.br/

The Liga de Amadores Brasileiros de Rádio Emissão (LABRE) (English: League of Brazilian Amateur Radio Transmitters) is a national non-profit organization for amateur radio enthusiasts in Brazil. LABRE has separate organizations for each state of Brazil. LABRE is recognized by the Brazilian Ministry of Communications. LABRE is the supporting organization for the Rede Nacional de Emergência de Radioamadores (RENER), a voluntary amateur radio emergency communications network in Brazil. LABRE was one of the sponsoring organizations for the 2006 World Radiosport Team Championship held in Florianópolis. LABRE is the national member society representing Brazil in the International Amateur Radio Union.

== History ==
LABRE was originally founded on February 1, 1931, in São Paulo, with the purpose of representing Brazilian radio amateurs, officially recognized in Brazil since November 5, 1924 (the first news about radio amateurs in Brazil is from 1909). On February 13, 1933, RBR - Rede Brasileira de Radioamadores (Brazilian Radio Amateurs Network) - was founded in Rio de Janeiro (at the time, the federal capital).

As the two organizations had the same objectives, that of representing Brazilian radio amateurs, hams from São Paulo and Rio de Janeiro met on February 2, 1934 and sealed the unification of the two entities under the name LABRE - Liga de Amadores Brasileiros de Rádio-Emissão, located in Rio de Janeiro. On October 22, 1934, a ceremony officially celebrates the unification of the two associations. In the act of foundation, preserved at the LABRE headquarters, an excerpt stands out: "that since this day, there would be no more rivalries between Brazilian radio amateurs".

=== Organization ===
LABRE has its headquarters, located in Brasília-DF, and subsidiaries in almost all Brazilian states. Each of these state sub-offices represents radio amateurs from their respective state before the central administration of LABRE.

== See also ==
- International Amateur Radio Union
