= Radio Club Venezolano =

Radio Club Venezolano Venezuelan Radio Club
- Abbreviation: RCV
- Formation: 1934
- Type: Non-profit organization
- Purpose: Advocacy, Education
- Location(s): Caracas, Venezuela FK60nm
- Region served: Venezuela
- Official language: Spanish
- President: Alfredo Medina, YV5SF
- Affiliations: International Amateur Radio Union
- Website: http://www.radioclubvenezolano.org/

The Radio Club Venezolano (RCV) (in English Venezuelan Radio Club) is a national non-profit organization for amateur radio enthusiasts in Venezuela. Key membership benefits of RCV include the sponsorship of amateur radio operating awards and radio contests, and a QSL bureau for those members who regularly communicate with amateur radio operators in other countries. RCV represents the interests of Venezuelan amateur radio operators before Venezuelan and international telecommunications regulatory authorities. RCV is the national member society representing Venezuela in the International Amateur Radio Union.

== History ==
In 1934, a group of radio broadcasters and science enthusiasts in Venezuela decided to create an institution to organize, teach, and represent the interests of all amateur radio enthusiasts in Venezuela. The Radio Club of Venezuela was founded and experimentation in amateur radio grew in the country. On February 25, 1936, the Telecommunication Department of Venezuela was created. In July, 1936, the first radio amateur licenses in Venezuela were issued. One of the original call signs was YV5AJ, assigned as a club call sign to the Radio Club of Venezuela. On July 25, 1936, the Radio Club of Venezuela was admitted as a member of the International Telecommunication Union.

== National Emergency Network ==
The National Emergency Network is an amateur radio emergency communications network administered by the Radio Club of Venezuela. The network is called into service when it is required to establish emergency communications during a natural or civil disaster that affects the country. The National Emergency Network uses the volunteer services of amateur radio stations throughout Venezuela, making it possible to establish communications from one side of the country to the other.

== See also ==
- International Amateur Radio Union
