= Polski Związek Krótkofalowców =

Amateur radio enthusiast organization in Poland

Polski Związek Krótkofalowców Polish Amateur Radio Union
- Abbreviation: PZK
- Formation: 1930
- Type: Non-profit organization
- Purpose: Advocacy, Education
- Location(s): Augustyna Kordeckiego Street 66 lok. U1 04-355 Warsaw, Poland KO02nf
- Region served: Poland
- Official language: Polish
- President: Krzysztof Horoszkiewicz, SP5E
- Affiliations: International Amateur Radio Union
- Website: http://www.pzk.org.pl/

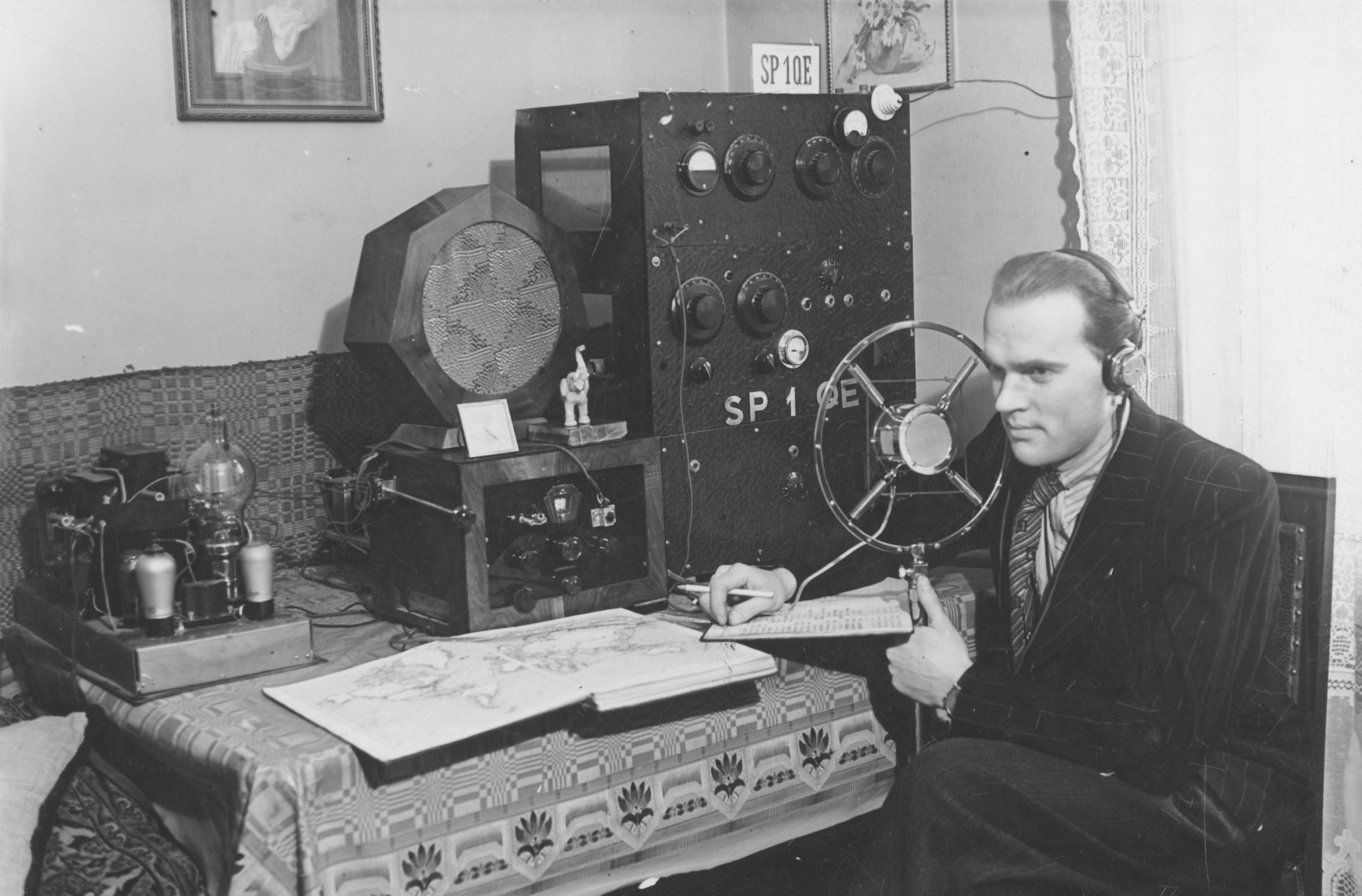
Polish amateur radiooperator Michał Wysokiński, callsign SP1QE, while working on an amateur radio station, transmitter AM, communications receiver AR-88

.

The Polski Związek Krótkofalowców (PZK) (in English, Polish Amateur Radio Union) is a national non-profit organization for amateur radio enthusiasts in Poland. Key membership benefits of the PZK include the sponsorship of amateur radio operating awards, radio contests, and a QSL bureau for members who regularly communicate with amateur radio operators in other countries. PZK is the national member society representing Poland in the International Amateur Radio Union.

== History ==
On February 22–24, 1930 Polski Zwiazek Krotkofalowcow (Polish Amateur Radio Union) was founded and professor Janusz Groszkowski of the Warsaw University of Technology was elected as its first President. World War II broke out in 1939 and amateur radio activities were ordered out of existence in Poland. It took years for PZK to be reborn on January 11, 1957, and to have amateur radio licenses being issued. PZK activities were financed by the government then on and the membership was obligatory for those who wanted to enjoy amateur radio privileges. Anatol Jeglinski (SP5CM) was elected as the new PZK President. Since 1990, PZK is financed by members & donors and its membership is no longer a requirement for licensing in Poland.

== Organizational structure ==
The PZK National Convention is supreme decision-making body, while daily affairs are run by Headquarters, the 5 member Presiding Committee. Committee members are elected for four years terms by the general membership delegates during National Convention and 33 field divisions directors. Executive officers are elected or appointed by the Committee itself.

== See also ==
- International Amateur Radio Union
