= Lietuvos Radijo Mėgėjų Draugija =

Lithuanian nonprofit organization

Lietuvos Radijo Mėgėjų Draugija Lithuanian Amateur Radio Society
- Abbreviation: LRMD
- Formation: 2 October 1938
- Type: Non-profit organization
- Purpose: Advocacy, Education
- Location(s): Vilnius, Lithuania; KO24pr
- Region served: Lithuania
- Official language: Lithuanian
- Chairman: Tadas Vyšniauskas LY2BAW
- Affiliations: International Amateur Radio Union
- Website: lrmd.lt

The Lietuvos Radijo Mėgėjų Draugija (LRMD) (in English, Lithuanian Amateur Radio Society) is a national non-profit organization for amateur radio enthusiasts in Lithuania. LRMD represents the interests of Lithuanian amateur radio operators before Lithuanian, European, and international telecommunications regulatory authorities. LRMD is the national member society representing Lithuania in the International Amateur Radio Union.

== History ==
=== Before WW2 ===
According to the LRMD web site, the society was founded in 1938 and was re-activated in 1988. In 1939, it was recognized as the national member for Lithuania by the IARU. In 1940, members LRMD were radio amateurs from two groups: 64 who had permits for transmitters and others as radio listeners. The LRMD has been legalised by the government as having all the rights of an official organization.

==== 1939 ====
Operations of Lithuanian radio amateurs was subject to the laws issued by the Lithuanian government in 1939. The permit to keep a short wave transmitter was given to individuals not younger than seventeen and who have passed the necessary examinations. During the first year, the newly licensed radio amateurs could work only telegraph, as telephone was permitted only from second year. The permit also gave the right to emit 50W of an anode power, but after two years it was possible to request for a permit to increase power to 1000W.

Owing to the war operations of 1939 coming very near the Lithuanian border, at 6 o’clock on 17 September 1939 the work of all the private radio transmitters in Lithuania, including amateur radio stations, was ceased.

On 28 October 1939, after the Battle of Wilno (1939), immediately after the Red Army withdrew from Vilnius, the first to visit Vilnius on that day were the radio amateurs Petras Vanagaitis LY1J and Julius Šatas, LY1S. During their visit, the Vilnius radio station (at the time known as Polish Radio Wilno and damaged by the bombing) was restored back into operations. Its transmitters in Liepkalnis worked on a frequency of 536 kHz (559,7 meter wavelength). During their visit in Vilnius, Vanagaitis and Šatas also visited local polish radio amateurs, but they found only a few, as most of them had joined to Polish army and left Vilnius, while others had joined the Red Army and left for SSSR.

==== 1940 ====
After the signing of the Soviet–Lithuanian Mutual Assistance Treaty, Lithuania went through several months of relative stability, therefore Lithuanian radio amateurs were allowed to operate transmitters again starting 7 January 1940, but communication between belligerent states in Europe was forbidden. Also on 7 January 1940, there was a general meeting of the LRMD members in Kaunas, at which a new LRMD committee was elected. Petras Vanagaitis-Jastržemskis LY1J was elected as president for the second time, Simas Grina LY1AR as secretary, Stepas Dedonis as treasurer, Antanas Sausionis (Sušinskas) LY1BG as QSL manager and Jonas Vilkaitis as the general manager.

=== Modern history ===
Most of the modern-time LRMD activity is documented in the LY-QTC magazine, which was published from 1989 till 2011.

In 2013, LRMD supported the LituanicaSAT-1 project, the first Lithuanian nanosatellite in low Earth orbit.

LRMD is a participant in the "Youngsters on the air" initiative by IARU since 2013. Together with Lietuvos Skautija, the primary national Scouting organization of Lithuania, LRMD is hosting annual Jamboree on the Air events.

=== Chairmen of the LRMD Board ===
- Tadas Vyšniauskas, LY2BAW (2018–present)
- Simonas Kareiva, LY2EN (2016–2018)
- Rolandas Mikalauskas, LY4Q (2010–2016)
- Tadas Vyšniauskas, LY2BAW (2006–2010)
- Gintautas Šėporaitis, LY2GV (1999–2006)
- Valdas Šležas, LY1BA (? – 1999)

== Member services ==
Key membership benefits of LRMD include the sponsorship of amateur radio operating awards and radio contests, and a QSL bureau for those members who regularly communicate with amateur radio operators in other countries. LRMD provides web page, photo gallery hosting and email services for its members upon request. The society is responsible for the annual amateur radio operator festival in Lithuania, the LRMD Hamfest.

According to the LRMD web site, the society has 375 active members.
