= Liga Colombiana de Radioaficionados =

Liga Colombiana de Radioaficionados Colombian Amateur Radio League
- Liga Colombiana de Radioaficionados
- Abbreviation: LCRA
- Formation: 1933
- Type: Non-profit organization
- Purpose: Advocacy, Education
- Location(s): Bogotá, Colombia; FJ24xr
- Region served: Colombia
- Official language: Spanish
- President: Jaime Hernando Duarte HK6W
- Main organ: General Assembly
- Affiliations: International Amateur Radio Union
- Website: lcra.org.co

The Liga Colombiana de Radioaficionados (LCRA) (in English Colombian Amateur Radio League) is a national non-for profit organization for amateur radio enthusiasts in Colombia. The organization was founded in 1933 by Italo Amore, Gustavo Uribe, Roberto Jaramillo Ferro, and other radio enthusiasts. At the time, all radio transmissions were authorized by the Ministry of Posts, who opposed a private amateur radio service. With LCRA lobbying efforts, private radio broadcasts were authorized in Colombia in 1936, and amateur radio was first licensed in Colombia in 1939.

Key membership benefits of LCRA include the sponsorship of amateur radio operating awards and radio contests, and a QSL bureau for those members who regularly communicate with amateur radio operators in other countries. LCRA represents the interests of Colombian amateur radio operators before Colombian and international telecommunications regulatory authorities. LCRA is the national member society representing Colombia in the International Amateur Radio Union.

== See also ==
- International Amateur Radio Union
