= Radio Club de Honduras =

Radio Club de Honduras Radio Club of Honduras
- Abbreviation: RCH
- Formation: July 26, 1958
- Type: Non-profit organization
- Purpose: Advocacy, Education
- Headquarters: San Pedro Sula, Honduras; EK55xl
- Region served: Honduras
- Official language: Spanish
- President: Antonio Handal HR2DX
- Affiliations: International Amateur Radio Union
- Website: www.hr2rch.com

The Radio Club de Honduras (RCH) (in English, Radio Club of Honduras) is a national non-profit organization for amateur radio enthusiasts in Honduras. RCH was founded on July 26, 1958, to support the scientific and technical interests of those in Honduras with an interest in radio. Key membership benefits of RCH include a QSL bureau for those amateur radio operators in regular communications with other amateur radio operators in foreign countries and sponsorship of amateur radio operating awards and radio contests. RCH represents the interests of Honduran amateur radio operators before Honduran and international regulatory authorities. RCH is the national member society representing Honduras in the International Amateur Radio Union.

== See also ==
- International Amateur Radio Union
