= Associazione Radioamatori Italiani =

National non-profit organization in Italy

- Abbreviation: ARI
- Formation: 1927
- Type: Non-profit organization
- Purpose: Advocacy, Education
- Headquarters: Milan, Italy; JN45ol
- Region served: Italy
- Official language: Italian
- President: Alessio Sacchi, IZ4EFN
- Affiliations: International Amateur Radio Union
- Website: Official website

The Associazione Radioamatori Italiani (ARI; English: Italian Amateur Radio Association) is a national non-profit organization for amateur radio enthusiasts in Italy.

== History ==
The ARI was founded in 1927 as the Associazione Radiotecnica Italiana (Italian Radio Technology Association) by Ernesto Montù, an early amateur radio operator. The organization recognized native Italian Guglielmo Marconi as the honorary President of the ARI until his death in 1937. Key membership benefits of the ARI include a QSL bureau for those amateur radio operators in regular communications with other amateur radio operators in foreign countries, and a monthly membership magazine called RadioRivista. The ARI represents the interests of Italian amateur radio operators before Italian and international regulatory authorities. ARI is the national member society representing Italy in the International Amateur Radio Union.

== See also ==
- International Amateur Radio Union
