= Iraqi Amateur Radio Society =

جمعية العراق لهواة اللاسلكي Iraqi Amateur Radio Society
- Abbreviation: IARS
- Formation: 1928
- Type: Non-profit organization
- Purpose: Advocacy, Education
- Location(s): Baghdad, Iraq; LM23eh
- Region served: Iraq
- Members: 110
- Official language: Arabic
- President: Salem A. Halboos, YI1SAL
- Affiliations: International Amateur Radio Union
- Website: http://www.iraqiars.com/

The Iraqi Amateur Radio Society (IARS) (in Arabic, هواة الراديو في المجتمع العراقي) is a national non-profit organization for amateur radio enthusiasts in Iraq. The organization uses IARS as its official international abbreviation, based on the English translation of the organization's name. IARS operates a QSL bureau for those members who regularly communicate with amateur radio operators in other countries and distributes a selection of Arabic-language books on amateur radio and radio technology. The IARS represents the interests of Iraqi amateur radio operators and shortwave listeners before Iraqi and international telecommunications regulatory authorities. Recognized in May 2005, IARS is the national member society representing Iraq in the International Amateur Radio Union.

== See also ==
- International Amateur Radio Union
