= Unión de Radioaficionados Españoles =

National non-profit organization for amateur radio enthusiasts in Spain

- Abbreviation: URE
- Type: Non-profit organization
- Purpose: Advocacy, Education
- Location(s): Madrid, Spain IN80dj
- Region served: Spain
- Members: 8,000
- Official language: Spanish
- President: Víctor M. Spínola Mena EA7FUN
- Affiliations: International Amateur Radio Union
- Website: http://www.ure.es/

The Unión de Radioaficionados Españoles (URE) (in English, Spanish Amateur Radio Union) is a national non-profit organization for amateur radio enthusiasts in Spain. The organization has approximately 8,000 members, predominantly amateur radio operators in Spain. URE promotes amateur radio by sponsoring amateur radio operating awards and radio contests. The URE also represents the interests of Spanish amateur radio operators and shortwave listeners before Spanish and international telecommunications regulatory authorities. URE is the national member society representing Spain in the International Amateur Radio Union.

== See also ==
- International Amateur Radio Union
