= Radio Club Peruano =

Radio Club Peruano Radio Club of Peru
- Abbreviation: RCP
- Formation: December 6, 1930
- Type: Non-profit organization
- Purpose: Advocacy, Education
- Location(s): Lima, Peru FH17lv
- Region served: Peru
- Official language: Spanish
- President: Oscar Pancorvo Romero OA4AMN
- Affiliations: International Amateur Radio Union
- Website: https://www.oa4o.pe/

The Radio Club Peruano (RCP) (in English, literally Radio Club of Peru) is a national non-profit organization for amateur radio enthusiasts in Peru. RCP was founded on December 6, 1930, and the first General Meeting of the organization was held in the halls of the Library of the Geographical Society in Lima, Peru in January, 1931. The RCP operates a QSL bureau for those amateur radio operators in regular contact with amateur radio operators in other countries, and supports amateur radio operating awards and radio contests. Radio Club Peruano represents the interests of Peruvian amateur radio operators before national and international regulatory authorities. RCP is the national member society representing Peru in the International Amateur Radio Union.

== Club Repeaters ==
Radio Club Peruano (RCP) operates four repeaters in the Lima metropolitan area, three within the two meter amateur radio allocation . One of the three 2 meter repeaters is dual analog and digital use, DMR being the digital encoding used. DMR has dual talk channels.

Frequency	Offset	Tone	Location	Country	Call	Use	Modes
146.88000	-0.6 MHz	82.5	Lima, Repetidora 3	PE	OA4EAC	OPEN	FM/DMR
146.96000	-0.6 MHz	82.5	Lima, Huaraz, Trujillo Repetidora 1	PE	OA4EBX	OPEN	FM
147.05000	+0.6 MHz	82.5	Lima, Repetidora 2	PE	OA4EEJ	OPEN	FM

DMR Enabled
Color Code:	1
DMR ID:	716003

== RENER ==
The National Amateur Radio Emergency Network (RENER) is a network made up of ALL Radio amateurs in Peru who have the desire and predisposition to provide support in situations in which help is needed by making emergency communications at the local and national level.

HF:	MODE	TONE	Emergency Use Description
3,730.0 kHz	(LSB)		Provinces phone link
7,078.0 kHz	(USB)		Digital Modes (JS8CALL) Local and International Link
7,100.0 kHz	(LSB)		Local and International Link - Primary Frequency
7,133.0 kHz	(LSB)		Local Link - Secondary Frequency
14,078.0 kHz	USB)		Digital Modes (JS8CALL) Local and International
14,137.0 kHz	(USB)		International Link - Primary Frequency
14,163.0 kHz	(USB)		International Link - Secondary Frequency
VHF:			
146.960 MHz	(-600 kHz)	Tone 82.5	Primary - RPT 1 (Lima, Huaraz, Trujillo)
147.365 MHz	(Direct)		RENER Emergency Frequency
147.050 MHz	(+600 kHz)	Tone 82.5	Secondary RPT 2 (Callao)

== See also ==
- International Amateur Radio Union
