= Croatian Amateur Radio Association =

Croatian Amateur Radio Association Hrvatski radioamaterski savez
- Abbreviation: HRS
- Formation: 1992
- Type: Non-profit organization
- Purpose: Advocacy, Education
- Location(s): Zagreb, Croatia; JN75xt
- Region served: Croatia
- Official language: Croatian
- President: Rolando Milin, 9A3MR
- Affiliations: International Amateur Radio Union
- Website: http://www.hamradio.hr/

The Croatian Amateur Radio Association (Croatian: Hrvatski radioamaterski savez, HRS) is a national non-profit organization for amateur radio enthusiasts in Croatia. Key membership benefits of HRS include the sponsorship of amateur radio operating awards and radio contests. HRS also supports local competitions in Amateur Radio Direction Finding as well as a national team that travels to regional and world championship events. HRS has been the sponsoring organization for the 2010 Amateur Radio Direction Finding World Championships held in Dubrovnik. HRS represents the interests of Croatian amateur radio operators before Croatian and international telecommunications regulatory authorities. HRS is the national member society representing Croatia in the International Amateur Radio Union.

== See also ==
- International Amateur Radio Union
