= Pakistan Amateur Radio Society =

- Abbreviation: PARS
- Type: Non-profit organization
- Purpose: Education
- Location(s): Islamabad, Pakistan; MM63mq
- Region served: Pakistan
- Official language: English
- President: Nasir H. Khan AP2NK
- Affiliations: International Amateur Radio Union
- Staff: 95
- Website: https://www.pakhams.com/

The Pakistan Amateur Radio Society (PARS) is a national non-profit organization for amateur radio enthusiasts in Pakistan. Headquartered in Islamabad, it operates a QSL bureau for those amateur radio operators in regular contact with amateur radio operators in other countries, and supports amateur radio operating awards and radio contests. It represents the interests of Pakistani amateur radio operators before national and international regulatory authorities. PARS is the national member society representing Pakistan in the International Amateur Radio Union.
