= Federacion Mexicana de Radio Experimentadores =

National non-profit organization for amateur radio enthusiasts in Mexico

- Abbreviation: FMRE
- Formation: 1932
- Type: Non-profit organization
- Purpose: Advocacy, Education
- Location(s): Mexico City, Mexico; EK09ji
- Region served: Mexico
- Official language: Spanish
- President: Alfonso Taméz Rodriguez XE2O
- Affiliations: International Amateur Radio Union
- Website: http://www.fmre.mx/

The Federacion Mexicana de Radio Experimentadores, A.C. (FMRE) (in English, literally Mexican Federation of Radio Experimenters) is a national non-profit organization for amateur radio enthusiasts in Mexico. Key membership benefits of the organization include QSL bureau services, the promotion and sponsorship of radio contests and operating awards, and an organization dedicated to emergency communications. FMRE promotes amateur radio by organizing classes and technical support to help enthusiasts earn their amateur radio license. Members receive a bimonthly magazine published by the organization, Onda corta. The FMRE also represents the interests of Mexican amateur radio operators before Mexican and international telecommunications regulatory authorities. FMRE is the national member society representing Mexico in the International Amateur Radio Union.

== See also ==
- International Amateur Radio Union
