= Royal Union of Belgian Radio Amateurs =

Koninklijke Unie van de Belgische Zendamateurs Union Royale Belge des Amateurs-Emetteurs Königliche Union der Belgischen Funkamateure
- Abbreviation: UBA
- Formation: January 25, 1947
- Type: Non-profit organization
- Purpose: Advocacy, Education
- Location(s): Brussels, Belgium JO20eu
- Region served: Belgium
- Members: 3,000
- Official language: Dutch, French, German
- President: Claude van Pottelsberghe de la Potterie ON7TK
- Affiliations: International Amateur Radio Union
- Website: http://www.uba.be/

The Royal Union of Belgian Radio Amateurs (UBA) (in Dutch, Koninklijke Unie van de Belgische Zendamateurs, in French Union Royale Belge des Amateurs-Emetteurs, in German Königliche Union der Belgischen Funkamateure) is a national non-profit organization for amateur radio enthusiasts in Belgium. UBA is the national member society representing Belgium in the International Amateur Radio Union.

== History ==
The UBA was founded on 25 January 1947, when separate amateur radio organizations based in Flanders and Wallonia merged. The Réseau Belge (literally, "Belgian Network") was founded in September, 1923 in Brussels and drew its membership primarily from the French-speaking radio amateurs in Brussels and Wallonia. In February 1926, the Réseau Belge began publishing a membership magazine called QSO. Flemish amateur radio operators were eager to see Dutch language articles in QSO, but were unable to persuade the editor of Réseau Belge to publish them. With the support of the publisher of a small Dutch language magazine called Radio, the Vlaamsche Radio Bond ("Flemish Radio Association") was founded in Ghent on September 22, 1929. The new organization established its own magazine called CQ VRB. After World War II, the two organizations agreed to combine into a unified national radio society for Belgium.

On January 9, 2001, the Royal Union of Belgian Radio Amateurs was officially recognised as an amateur association by ministerial decree under legislation dealing with the establishment of amateur radio stations.

== Services ==
UBA supports amateur radio operators in Belgium by sponsoring amateur radio operating awards, radio contests, and Amateur Radio Direction Finding competitions. The UBA also operates a QSL bureau for those members who regularly communicate with amateur radio operators in other countries. UBA represents the interests of Belgian amateur radio operators and shortwave listeners before Belgian and international telecommunications regulatory authorities. The UBA also publishes a monthly membership magazine called CQ QSO.
