= International Amateur Radio Union =

International confederation of organizations for amateur radio operators

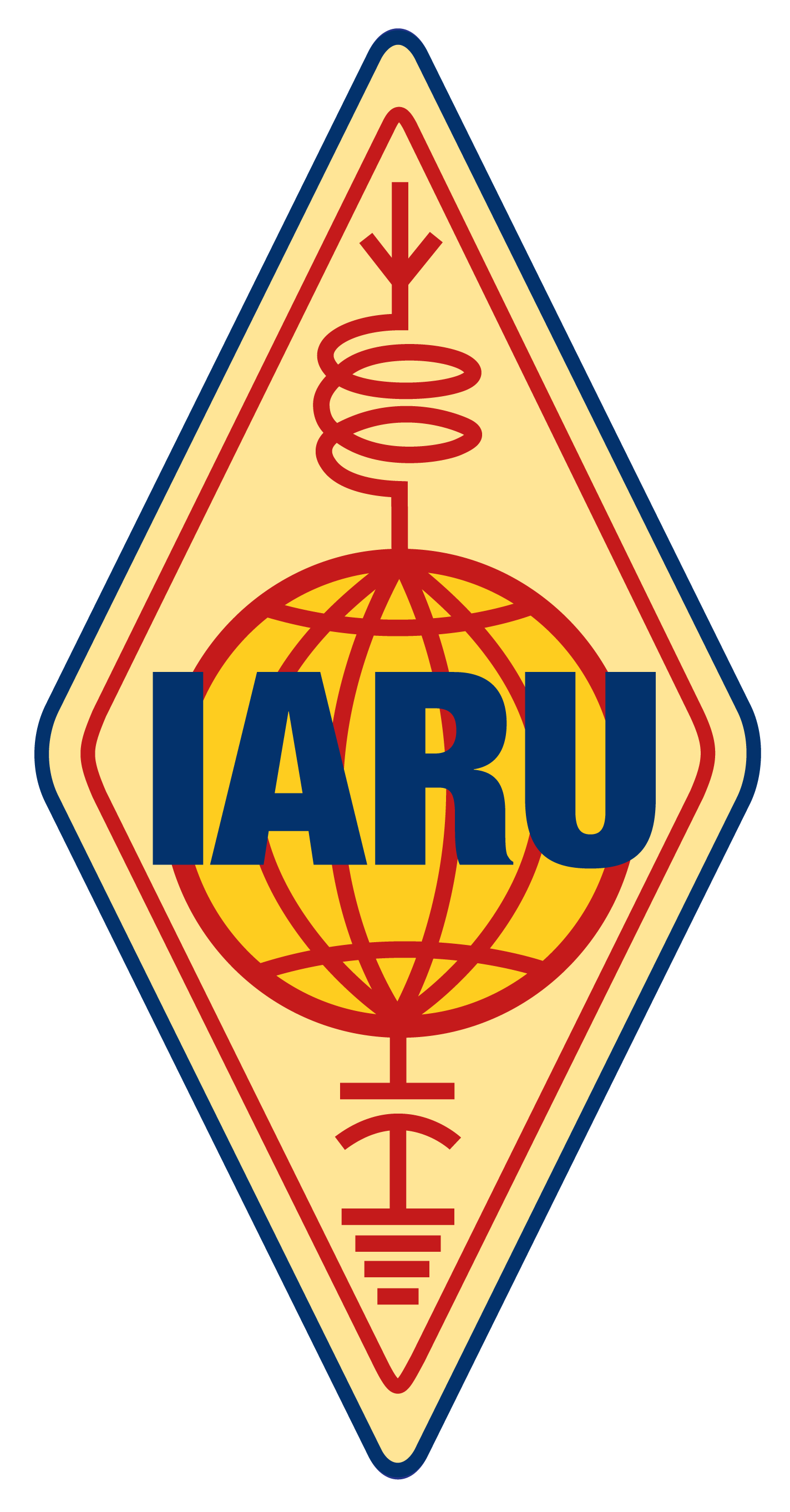
- Abbreviation: IARU
- Formation: 1925
- Type: International nongovernmental organization (INGO)
- Headquarters: Newington, Connecticut, US
- Region served: Worldwide
- Members: 174 national member societies
- Official language: English
- President: Tim Ellam, VE6SH
- Main organ: Administrative Council
- Website: www.iaru.org

The International Amateur Radio Union (IARU) is an international confederation of national organisations that allows a forum for common matters of concern to amateur radio operators worldwide, and collectively represents matters to the International Telecommunication Union (ITU). The International Amateur Radio Union was founded in 1925 and, as of July 2021, it is composed of 174 national member societies.

== History ==
Following an informal meeting in 1924 of representatives from France, Great Britain, Belgium, Switzerland, Italy, Spain, Luxembourg, Canada, and the United States, a plan was formulated to hold an International Amateur Congress in Paris, France, in April 1925. This Congress was held for the purpose of founding an international amateur radio organization. The Congress was attended by representatives of 23 countries in Europe, Americas, and Asia. A constitution for the IARU was adopted on April 17, and the formation of the International Amateur Radio Union was ratified on April 18, 1925. In the current era, this is the date (April 18) on which World Amateur Radio Day is celebrated.

The protocol of the congress was written in English, French and Esperanto.

== Governance ==
The IARU has an elected president and vice president, an appointed secretary and other officials (including regional representatives) forming an Administrative Council (IARU-AC). These office holders are presently Timothy Ellam, VE6SH (Canada), president; Thomas Wrede, DF2OO (Germany), vice-president; and Joel Harrison, W5ZN (United States), secretary. The IARU International Secretariat (IARU-IS) is operated by a member society after election by members. Currently, the American Radio Relay League (ARRL) operates the IARUIS from its headquarters in Newington, Connecticut, US.

== Regional organisation ==
Countries with IARU Member Societies. Region 1 (103 members) Region 2 (42 members) Region 3 (29 members)

The IARU is organised into three regions, named Region 1, Region 2, and Region 3. These regions correspond to the regulatory regions used by the International Telecommunication Union. Each region has an executive committee, typically composed of a president, vice-president, secretary, treasurer, and several directors. These regional officers are elected by representatives from the member societies at triennial regional conferences. Coordinators may be appointed by the executive committee of their region to support particular areas within the region, or to promote certain amateur radio activities within the region. All three regions have appointed coordinators for Amateur Radio Direction Finding, emergency communications, monitoring for electromagnetic interference

=== IARU Region 1 ===
IARU Region 1 includes the member societies representing amateur radio operators in Africa, Europe, the Middle East, and northern Asia. IARU Region 1 has the largest number of member societies among the three IARU regions, and has been the source of several international initiatives. IARU Region 1 lobbying efforts led to the creation of the 30 meter, 17 meter, and 12 meter amateur radio bands, improving the standardization of reciprocal licensing, promoting Amateur Radio Direction Finding and initiating youth related activities, known as "the Youngsters On the Air project" (YOTA).

Executive officers:

- President: (France) Sylvain Azarian, F4GKR
- Vice-President: (Lebanon) Hani Raad, OD5TE
- Secretary: (Sweden) Mats Espling, SM6EAN
- Treasurer: (Switzerland) Andreas Thiemann, HB9JOE

Country	Member Society	Abbreviation and website (if available)
Albania	Albanian Federation of Radio Amateurs	FSHRA
Algeria	Association of Algerian Radio Amateurs	ARA
Andorra	Andorran Amateur Radio Union	URA
Armenia	Federation of Radiosport of the Republic of Armenia	FRRA
Austria	Austrian Amateur Radio Society	OEVSV
Azerbaijan	Federation of Radiosport of the Republic of Azerbaijan	FRS
Bahrain	Bahrain Amateur Radio Society	BARS
Belarus	Belarusian Federation of Radioamateurs and Radiosportsmen	BFRR
Belgium	Royal Union of Belgian Radio Amateurs	UBA
Bosnia and Herzegovina	Amateur Radio Association of Bosnia and Hercegovina	ARAuBiH
Botswana	Botswana Amateur Radio Society	BARS
Bulgaria	Bulgarian Federation of Radio Amateurs	BFRA
Burkina Faso	Burkina Faso Amateur Radio Association	ARBF
Burundi	Burundian Amateur Radio and Television Association	ABART
Cameroon	Cameroon Amateur Radio Association	ARTJ
Ivory Coast	Ivorian Amateur Radio Association	ARAI
Croatia	Croatian Amateur Radio Association	HRS
Cyprus	Cyprus Amateur Radio Society	CARS
Czech Republic	Czech Radio Club	CRK
Democratic Republic of the Congo	Congolese Amateur Radio Association	ARAC
Denmark	Danish Amateur Radio Experimenters	EDR
Djibouti	Djibouti Amateur Radio Association	ARAD
Egypt	Egyptian Radio Amateurs Society for Development	ERASD
Estonia	Estonian Radio Amateurs' Union	ERAU
Eswatini	Radio Society of Eswatini	RSE
Ethiopia	Ethiopian Amateur Radio Society	EARS
Faroe Islands	Radio Amateurs of the Faroe Islands	FRA
Finland	Finnish Amateur Radio League	SRAL
France	Network of French Transmitters	REF
Gabon	Gabonese Amateur Radio Association	AGRA
Gambia	Radio Society of The Gambia	RSTG
Georgia	National Association of Radio Amateurs of Georgia	NARG
Germany	German Amateur Radio Club	DARC
Ghana	Ghana Amateur Radio Society	GARS
Gibraltar	Gibraltar Amateur Radio Society	GARS
Greece	Radio Amateur Association of Greece	RAAG
Guinea	Guinean Amateur Radio Association	ARGUI
Hungary	Hungarian Amateur Radio Association	MRASZ
Iceland	Icelandic Radio Amateurs	IRA
Iraq	Iraqi Amateur Radio Society	IARS
Ireland	Irish Radio Transmitters Society	IRTS
Israel	Israel Association of Radio Communication	IARC
Italy	Italian Amateur Radio Association	ARI
Jordan	Royal Jordanian Radio Amateur Society	RJRAS
Kazakhstan	Kazakhstan Federation of Radiosport and Radio Amateur	KFRR
Kenya	Amateur Radio Society of Kenya	ARSK
Kosovo	Association of Radio Amateurs of Kosovo	SHRAK
Kuwait	Kuwait Amateur Radio Society	KARS
Kyrgyzstan	Amateur Radio Union of the Kyrgyz Republic	ARUKR
Latvia	Latvian Amateur Radio League	LRAL
Lebanon	Radio Amateurs of Lebanon	RAL
Lesotho	Lesotho Amateur Radio Society	LARS
Liberia	Liberia Radio Amateur Association	LRAA
Libya	Libyan Communications Amateur Society	LCAS
Liechtenstein	Amateur Radio Association of Liechtenstein	AFVL
Lithuania	Lithuanian Amateur Radio Society	LRMD
Luxembourg	Luxembourg Amateur Radio Society	RL
Mali	Club of Radio Amateurs and Affiliates of Mali	CRAM
Malta	Malta Amateur Radio League	MARL
Mauritius	Mauritius Amateur Radio Society	MARS
Moldova	Amateur Radio Society of Moldova	ARM
Monaco	Monegasque Amateur Radio Association	ARM
Mongolia	Mongolian Radio Sport Federation	MRSF
Montenegro	Montenegrin Amateur Radio Pool	MARP
Morocco	Royal Moroccan Amateur Radio Association	ARRAM
Mozambique	Mozambique Amateur Radio League	LREM
Namibia	Namibian Amateur Radio League	NARL
Netherlands	Dutch Association for Experimental Radio Research	VERON
Nigeria	Nigeria Amateur Radio Society	NARS
North Macedonia	Radio Amateur Society of North Macedonia	RSM
Norway	Norwegian Radio Relay League	NRRL
Oman	Royal Omani Amateur Radio Society	ROARS
Poland	Polish Amateur Radio Union	PZK
Portugal	Network of Portuguese Transmitters	REP
Qatar	Qatar Amateur Radio Society	QARS
Republic of the Congo	Congolese Amateur Radio Union	URAC
Romania	Romanian Federation of Amateur Radio	FRR
Russia	Russian Amateur Radio Union	SRR
Rwanda	Rwanda Amateur Radio Union	RARU
San Marino	Radio Amateur Association of the Republic of San Marino	ARRSM
Saudi Arabia	Saudi Amateur Radio Society	SARS
Senegal	Senegalese Amateur Radio Association	ARAS
Serbia	Amateur Radio Union of Serbia	SRS
Seychelles	Seychelles Amateur Radio Association	SARA
Sierra Leone	Sierra Leone Amateur Radio Society	SLARS
Slovakia	Slovak Amateur Radio Association	SZR
Slovenia	Association of Radio Amateurs of Slovenia	ZRS
South Africa	South African Radio League	SARL
Spain	Spanish Amateur Radio Union	URE
Sudan	Sudan Amateur Radio Union	SARU
Sweden	Swedish Society of Radio Amateurs	SSA
Switzerland	Union of Swiss Short Wave Amateurs	USKA
Syria	Syrian Scientific Technical Amateur Radio Society	SSTARS
Tajikistan	Tajik Amateur Radio League	TARL
Tanzania	Tanzania Amateur Radio Club	TARC
Tunisia	Tunisian Amateur Radio Association	ARAT
Turkey	Turkish Amateur Radio Association	TRAC
Turkmenistan	League of Radio Amateurs of Turkmenistan	LRT
Uganda	Uganda Amateur Radio Society	UARS
Ukraine	Ukrainian Amateur Radio League	UARL
United Arab Emirates	Emirates Amateur Radio Society	EARS
United Kingdom	Radio Society of Great Britain	RSGB
Zambia	Radio Society of Zambia (withdrawn)	RSZ
Zimbabwe	Zimbabwe Amateur Radio Society	ZARS

=== IARU Region 2 ===
IARU Region 2 includes the member societies representing amateur radio operators in the Americas. The organization of IARU Region 2 was founded in 1964 when representatives from 15 national radio societies attended the First Panamerican Radio Amateur Congress in Mexico City, Mexico. Antonio Pita, XE1CCP was the region's first elected president.

Executive officers:

- President: (Mexico) Ramón Santoyo, XE1KK
- Vice-President: (El Salvador) José Arturo Molina, YS1MS
- Secretary: (Canada) George Gorsline, VE3YV
- Treasurer: (United States) John Bellows, K0QB

Country	Member society	Abbreviation and website (if available)
Anguilla	Anguilla Amateur Radio Society	AARS
Antigua and Barbuda	Antigua and Barbuda Amateur Radio Society	ABARS
Argentina	Argentine Radio Club	RCA
Aruba	Aruba Amateur Radio Club	AARC
Bahamas	Bahamas Amateur Radio Society	BARS
Barbados	Amateur Radio Society of Barbados	ARSB
Belize	Belize Amateur Radio Club	BARC
Bermuda	Radio Society of Bermuda	RSB
Bolivia	Radio Club of Bolivia	RCB
Brazil	League of Brazilian Amateur Radio Transmitters	LABRE
British Virgin Islands	British Virgin Islands Radio League	BVIRL
Canada	Radio Amateurs of Canada	RAC
Cayman Islands	Cayman Amateur Radio Society	CARS
Chile	Chilean Radio Club	RCCH
Colombia	Colombian Amateur Radio League	LCRA
Costa Rica	Radio Club of Costa Rica	RCCR
Cuba	Cuban Amateur Radio Federation	FRC
Curaçao	Dutch Caribbean Association for Experimental Radio Research	VERONA
Dominica	Dominica Amateur Radio Club	DARCI
Dominican Republic	Radio Club of the Dominican Republic	RCD
Ecuador	Guayaquil Radio Club	GRC
El Salvador	El Salvador Amateur Radio Club	CRAS
Grenada	Grenada Amateur Radio Society	GARS
Guatemala	Guatemala Amateur Radio Club	CRAG
Guyana	Guyana Amateur Radio Association (suspended)	GARA
Haiti	Haitian Radio Club	RCH
Honduras	Radio Club of Honduras	RCH
Jamaica	Jamaica Amateur Radio Association	JARA
Mexico	Mexican Federation of Radio Experimenters	FMRE
Montserrat	Montserrat Amateur Radio Society	MARS
Nicaragua	Nicaraguan Radio Experimenters' Club	CREN
Panama	Panamanian Amateur Radio League	LPRA
Paraguay	Radio Club of Paraguay	RCP
Peru	Radio Club of Peru	RCP
Saint Kitts and Nevis	St. Kitts-Nevis-Anguilla Amateur Radio Society	SKNAARS
Saint Vincent and the Grenadines	St. Vincent & the Grenadines Amateur Radio Club	SVGARC
Suriname	Association of Radio Amateurs of Suriname (suspended)	VRAS
Trinidad and Tobago	Trinidad and Tobago Amateur Radio Society	TTARS
Turks and Caicos Islands	Turks and Caicos Amateur Radio Society	TACARS
United States	American Radio Relay League (IARU International Secretariat)	ARRL
Uruguay	Radio Club of Uruguay	RCU
Venezuela	Radio Club of Venezuela	RCV

=== IARU Region 3 ===
IARU Region 3 includes the member societies representing amateur radio operators in Australia, most of Asia, and the Pacific Islands. Although most of their membership is located in other IARU regions, the American Radio Relay League and the Radio Society of Great Britain are full member societies of IARU Region 3. The ARRL represents amateur radio operators in American Samoa, Guam, the Northern Marianas, and other dependent territories in the Pacific Ocean. The RSGB represents amateur radio operators in the British Indian Ocean Territory. IARU Region 3 has a special emphasis on promoting the harmonization of license qualifications in an effort to promote easier reciprocal operations by amateur radio operators in the region.

Executive officers:

- President: (Indonesia) Wisnu Widjaja, YB0AZ
- Secretary: (Japan) Shizuo Endo, JE1MUI

Country	Member society	Abbreviation and website (if available)
Australia	Wireless Institute of Australia	WIA
Bangladesh	Bangladesh Amateur Radio League	BARL
Brunei	Brunei Darussalam Amateur Radio Association	BDARA
China	Chinese Radio Amateurs Club	CRAC
Republic of China	Chinese Taipei Amateur Radio League	CTARL
Fiji	Fiji Association of Radio Amateurs	FARA
French Polynesia	Oceanian Radio and Astronomy Club	CORA
Hong Kong	Hong Kong Amateur Radio Transmitting Society	HARTS
India	Amateur Radio Society of India	ARSI
Indonesia	Organisasi Amatir Radio Indonesia	ORARI
Japan	Japan Amateur Radio League	JARL
Macau	Macau Amateur Radio Society	ARM
Malaysia	Malaysian Amateur Radio Transmitters' Society	MARTS
Myanmar	Burma Amateur Radio Transmitting Society (suspended)	BARTS
New Caledonia	New Caledonian Amateur Radio Association	ARANC
New Zealand	New Zealand Association of Radio Transmitters	NZART
Pakistan	Pakistan Amateur Radio Society	PARS
Papua New Guinea	Papua New Guinea Amateur Radio Society (suspended)	PNGARS
Philippines	Philippine Amateur Radio Association	PARA
Pitcairn Islands	Pitcairn Island Amateur Radio Association	PIARA
Samoa	Samoa Amateur Radio Club	SARC
Singapore	Singapore Amateur Radio Transmitting Society	SARTS
Solomon Islands	Solomon Islands Radio Society	SIRS
South Korea	Korean Amateur Radio League	KARL
Sri Lanka	Radio Society of Sri Lanka	RSSL
Thailand	Radio Amateur Society of Thailand under The Royal Patronage of His Majesty The King	RAST
Tonga	Amateur Radio Club of Tonga	ARCOT
Vanuatu	Vanuatu Amateur Radio Society	VARS
Vietnam	Vietnam Amateur Radio Club	VARC

=== Countries without IARU member societies ===
* = Amateur radio licenses not issued in this country

Region 1	Region 2	Region 3
Angola; Benin; Cape Verde; Central African Republic; Chad; Comoros; Equatorial Guinea; Eritrea; Guinea-Bissau; Madagascar; Malawi; Mauritania; Niger; Palestine; Somalia; South Sudan; Togo; Uzbekistan; Vatican City; Yemen*	Greenland; Saint Lucia	Afghanistan; Bhutan; Cambodia; Cook Islands; Federated States of Micronesia; Iran; Kiribati; Laos; Maldives; Marshall Islands; Nauru; Nepal; Niue; North Korea*; Palau; Timor-Leste; Tuvalu

== GAREC - Global Amateur Radio Emergency Communications Conferences ==
The Global Amateur Radio Emergency Communications Conference or "GAREC" was a yearly conference held by the International Amateur Radio Union for discussion of amateur radio operation during natural disasters and other emergencies with the motto, "Saving lives through emergency communications". GAREC was first held in Tampere, Finland in 2005, coinciding with the adoption of the Tampere Convention, a globally binding emergency communications treaty that had been signed in Tampere in 1998. In later conferences, the venue has attempted to rotate in sequence through ITU Regions 1, 2 and 3 (though not necessarily in that particular order). The dedicated GAREC meetings eventually concluded in 2014.

== Radiosport ==
The IARU organises and promotes radiosport activities throughout the world. The IARU promulgates the rules used for high-speed telegraphy and sponsors regional and world championships. The IARU also promulgates the rules used by most competitions in amateur radio direction finding, including IARU-sponsored regional and world championships. The IARU also sponsors the annual IARU HF World Championship in amateur radio contesting. The IARU does not directly administer any of these radiosport events, but authorises and sponsors them through host organisations.

== Operating Station and the WAC Award ==
The IARU maintains a radio station at its headquarters in Newington, Connecticut. Its callsign is NU1AW. As an amateur radio station licensed by the U.S. Federal Communications Commission the "1" stands for its location in the New England area. "NU" was taken from the pre-1928 era when amateurs made up their own prefixes, and informally used these letters to show they were in "North America—USA". The "AW" suffix represents the connection with the American Radio Relay League, whose own station is W1AW. NU1AW is frequently active during amateur radio contests.

For many years the IARU has issued the Worked All Continents certificate to amateurs who contact fellow hams in the six permanently populated continental areas of the world. Special awards and endorsements for various bands and modes are also available.

== See also ==
- International distress frequency#Amateur radio frequencies
