= Belarusian Federation of Radioamateurs and Radiosportsmen =

Non-profit amateur radio organization

Беларуская федэрацыя радыёаматараў і радыёспартсменаў Belarusian Federation of Radioamateurs and Radiosportsmen
- Abbreviation: BFRR
- Type: Non-profit organization
- Purpose: Advocacy, Education
- Location(s): Minsk, Belarus; KO33sw
- Region served: Belarus
- Official language: Belarusian
- President: Aliaksey Albertavich Artsiushyn (EU1OA)
- Affiliations: International Amateur Radio Union
- Website: http://www.bfrr.net/

The Belarusian Federation of Radioamateurs and Radiosportsmen (Belarusian: Беларуская федэрацыя радыёаматараў і радыёспартсменаў, romanized: Bielaruskaja fiederacyja radyjoamataraŭ i radyjospartśmienaŭ) is a national non-profit organization for amateur radio enthusiasts in Belarus. The organization uses BFRR as its acronym, based on the standard Romanization of the Belarusian name of the organization. The name of the organization reflects an early purpose of the organization: to support radiosport activities within Belarus. In addition to High Speed Telegraphy and Amateur Radio Direction Finding, BFRR now supports a wide variety of amateur radio activities. Key membership benefits of BFRR include the sponsorship of amateur radio operating awards and radio contests, and a QSL bureau for those members who regularly communicate with amateur radio operators in other countries.

BFRR represents the interests of Belarusian amateur radio operators before Belarusian, European, and international telecommunications regulatory authorities. BFRR is the national member society representing Belarus in the International Amateur Radio Union.
