= Contesting technology =

Tools for amateur radio sport

The sport of amateur radio contesting has been responsible for the development of contesting technology specific to the sport. The most competitive stations participating in contests employ new and innovative technology, hardware, and software. Some of these innovations are exclusively used in the sport of contesting; others have seen wider application in amateur radio at large.

== Computer-generated CW ==
One of the most widely used contesting technologies is computer-generated CW. Most contest logging software packages support the use of a parallel port or serial port interface that connects to the keying input on amateur radio transceivers for sending Morse code. Some interfaces also include an input for a telegraph key. CW can be generated from text typed on the computer keyboard, from a telegraph key, or from memories in the computer associated with steps in the process of making contest contacts. Some software can use databases of additional information about other amateur radio stations on the air to include personalized greetings during two-way contacts.

== Station automation ==
"Station automation" refers to the use of technology to connect the operation of several discrete hardware components to accomplish a larger task. One common example of station automation is the automatic switching of antennas, filters, amplifiers, SWR meters, or other equipment when a radio changes frequency. Most modern amateur radio transceivers include some sort of computer control interface, often implemented with the RS-232 protocol. Information from the radio about its current frequency of operation can be used by contest logging software or external hardware devices known as band decoders to automatically configure the operation of amplifiers, antenna switches, filters, or other devices.

A particular station automation device used in VHF and microwave contest stations is known as a sequencer. A sequencer uses a series of relays to switch a number of components from their reception state to their transmission state. In a station with a transceiver, transverter, preamp, and amplifier, it is important that some devices are switched from their reception state before others are switched into their transmission state to avoid damage to very sensitive electronic components.

== SO2R technology ==
Single operator two radios contesting requires certain specialty radio hardware. The most important is a device capable of switching the microphone, Morse code key, or sound card interface for digital mode transmissions, between two radio transceivers. Another necessity is the ability to switch or mix audio from two different radios to a single pair of headphones. This is generally accomplished with a single hardware device known as an SO2R Switch Box. Some contest logging software packages can use simple parallel port or serial port interfaces to communicate with these switch boxes and allow the SO2R operator to switch radio or audio focus directly from the computer keyboard.
