= World Radiosport Team Championship =

Amateur radio competition

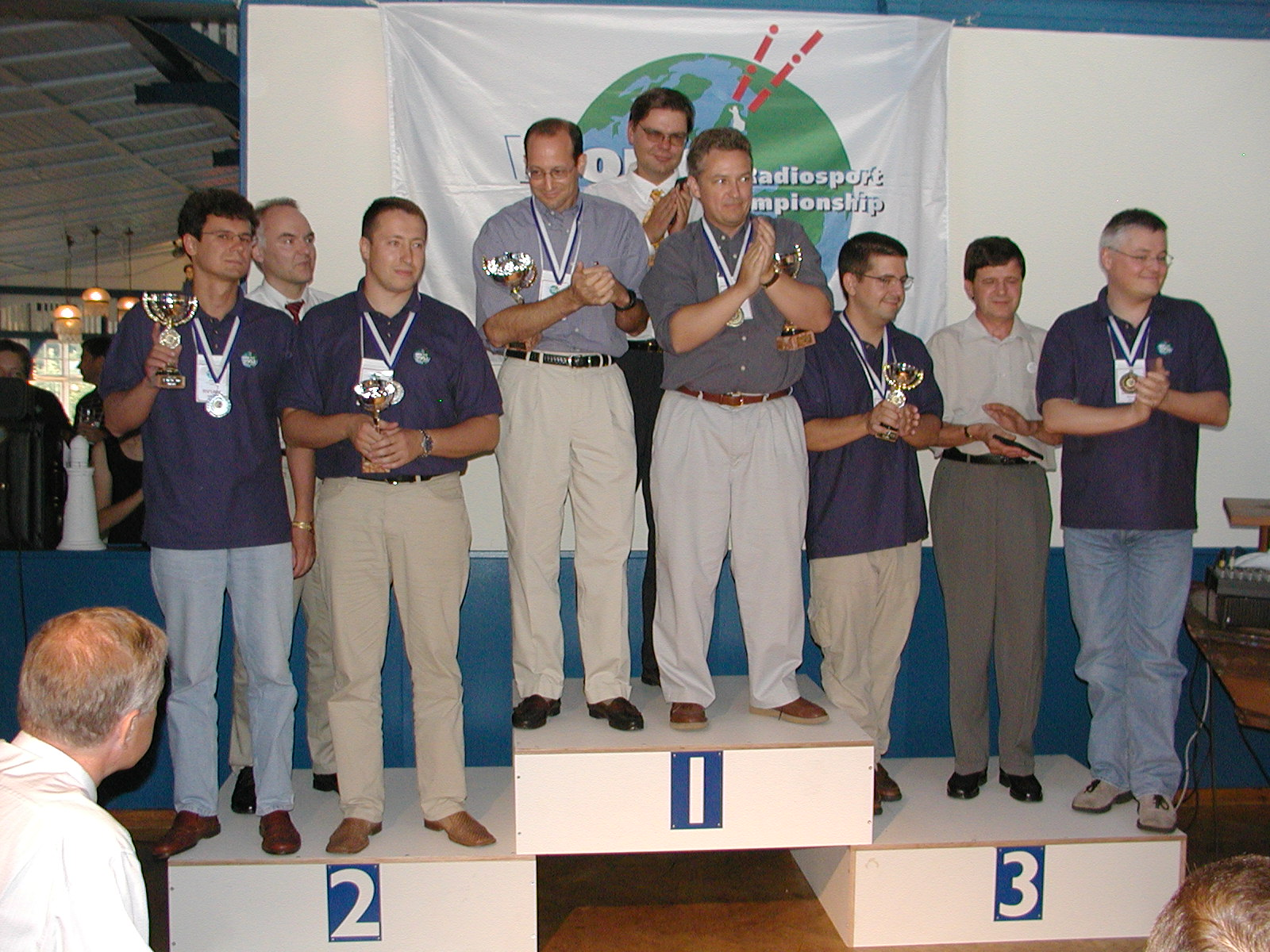
Champions of WRTC 2002

The World Radiosport Team Championship is an amateur radio competition. Participation is by invitation only. Entry to each quadrennial WRTC requires qualification through high positions in major world radio contests. The main principle of the WRTC is to provide a level playing field for the qualified contestants from around the world to compete against one another using amateur radio stations located in areas with the same propagation terrain and equipped with identical antennas, operating with referee oversight. Each WRTC event is organised by a volunteer group of Radio Amateurs in the locality where the competition will be held. The WRTC is the closest thing to a world championship in the sport of radio contesting. In 2018 over 1000 people were involved with a cost of over half a million Euros. WRTC2018 web page

== History ==
WRTC 2014 was held in New England USA.

The first World Radiosport Team Championship event was held in July, 1990 in Seattle, Washington, United States and was timed to coincide with the Goodwill Games being held that summer in the same city. Teams of two competitors each operated in a unique, one-time contest, created specifically to coincide with WRTC. All of the stations used by the WRTC teams were located at existing amateur radio stations in the Seattle area. Twenty-two teams of two operators each represented 15 different countries. In addition to the two team members, a referee was present at each station to monitor compliance with the WRTC rules. First place went to the team of John Dorr, K1AR and Doug Grant, K1DG of the United States, second place to the team of Mike Wetzel, W9RE and Chip Margelli, K7JA of the United States, and third place went to Jeff Steinman, KRØY and Bob Shohet, KQ2M of the United States.

The next WRTC event was held in the San Francisco, California, USA area in July, 1996. The format continued to be teams of two competitors each, operating at stations with similar antenna and power restrictions, participating in the IARU HF World Championship, a world-wide operating event that includes both phone and CW operation. A major innovation at WRTC 1996 was the assignment of special-event call signs to each of the competitive stations, randomly assigned to each team. Fifty-two teams of two operators each represented twenty-four countries and all six inhabited continents. First place went to the team of Jeff Steinman, KRØY and Dan Street, K1TO of the United States, second place to the team of John Laney III, K4BAI and Bill Fisher, KM9P of the United States, and third place went to the team of Dave Hachadorian, K6LL and Steve London, N2IC of the United States.

WRTC 2000 was held in July in Slovenia. While the event headquarters were in the resort city of Bled, the competitive stations were spread throughout the country. WRTC 2000 was the first event where all stations were equipped with identical antennas. Fifty-three teams of two operators each represented twenty-five nations. First place went to the team of Jeff Steinman, N5TJ (formerly KRØY) and Dan Street, K1TO of the United States, second place to the team of Igor Booklan, RA3AUU and Andrei Karpov, RV1AW of Russia, and third place went to the team of Doug Grant, K1DG and John Dorr, K1AR of the United States.

WRTC 2002 was held in July in Helsinki, Finland. A major innovation in Finland was a near-real-time scoreboard publish on a web site during the event. On-site referees at each WRTC competition station used cellular phones to send their station's running contact totals and score to a central database each hour. The scores were published during the event on a web site that listed only the call signs of the operators at each site, without disclosing the call sign being used on the air. Fifty-two teams of two operators each represented twenty-eight countries. First place went to the team of Jeff Steinman, N5TJ and Dan Street, K1TO of the United States, second place to the team of Igor Booklan, RA3AUU and Andrei Karpov, RV1AW of Russia, and third place went to the team of Frank Grossmann, DL2CC and Bernd Och, DL6FBL of Germany.

WRTC 2006 was held in Florianópolis, Brazil, and introduced a qualification scoring system for potential competitors. Teams were provided with larger antennas and 700 watt amplifiers in 2006, to help compensate for the greater distance from Brazil to the main centers of contesting activity in Europe and North America. After winning three WRTCs in a row, Jeff Steinman, N5TJ and Dan Street, K1TO did not compete in the 2006 event. First place went to John Sluymer VE3EJ and James Roberts VE7ZO of Canada, the first time a team from outside the United States had won the WRTC competition. Dan Craig N6MJ and Dave Mueller N2NL of the United States achieved second place, and third place went to Doug Grant, K1DG and Andy Blank, N2NT of the United States.

WRTC 2010 was held in Moscow, Russia, organized by the Russian Amateur Radio Union. 48 teams representing 24 countries participated. For the first time, all operating sites were chosen to be as equal as possible. All competitors operated "Field Day style" using portable electric generators. Also new in WRTC 2010, both operators were allowed to operate at the same time, interleaving contacts with only one transmitted at a time, an operating style borrowed from the Russian Radiosport Team Championship (RRTC). First place went to the Russian team of Vladimir Aksenov, RW1AC and Alexey Mikhailov, RA1AIP. Tõnno Vähk, ES5TV and Toivo Hallikivi, ES2RR from Estonia came in second. Dan Craig, N6MJ and Chris Hurlbut, KL9A from the U.S.A. finished third.

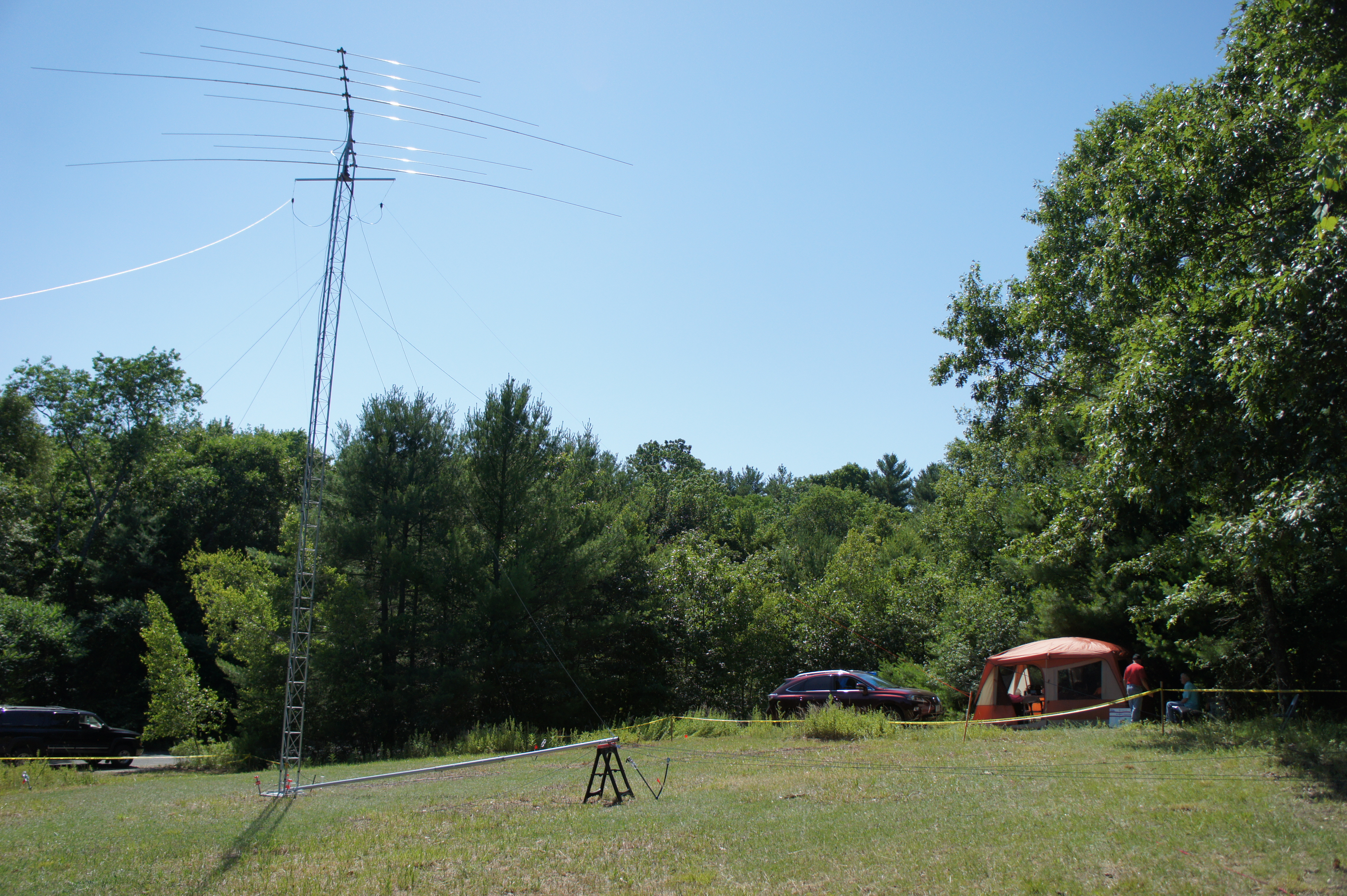
WRTC 2014 station in Massachusetts, USA

WRTC 2014 was held primarily in Eastern Massachusetts, USA. 59 teams representing 39 countries. Similar to WRTC 2010, temporary locations with tents, generators, a 40-foot tower with tri-band Yagi and inverted vee antennas were constructed by local volunteers. For the first time, both operators were allowed to transmit simultaneously, as in a "Multioperator, Two-Transmitter" (M/2) competition. First place went to Dan Craig, N6MJ and Chris Hurlbut, KL9A from the U.S.A. Rastislav Hrnko, OM3BH, and Jozef Lang, OM3GI from Slovakia, finished second. Manfred Wolf, DJ5MW and Stefan von Baltz, DL1IAO from Germany finished third, just edging out the American team of Kevin Stockton, N5DX and Steve London, N2IC, by a single multiplier.

WRTC 2018 was held in Wittenberg, Germany. First place went to Gediminas Lucinskas, LY9A and Mindaugas Jukna, LY4L from Lithuania.

WRTC 2022 was held in 2023 in Bologna, Italy. The results were revised in September 2026 and two teams were disqualified. After adjudication, the German team of Manfred Wolf, DJ5MW and Stefan von Baltz, DL1IAO were declared the winners.

WRTC 2026 was be held in East Anglia, UK in July 2026. Initial scoring announced on July 13th, 2026 was adjusted on September 1st, 2026. Violating of WRTC rules caused four cases of disqualification of the teams and the winners were announced to be Manfred Wolf, DJ5MW and Ulrich Ann, DM5EE.

== Competition ==
The process of selection and invitation to compete in the World Radiosport Team Championship has varied with each event. The selection process has recently been structured to ensure a certain number of contesters from each part of the world will be invited to the competition. Participants selected to compete in WRTC are generally not sponsored and must pay their own travel and lodging expenses in order to attend.

Each team of two contesters participates in the IARU HF World Championship radio contest, held on the second full weekend of July. A random draw is done to assign each team to a particular station, referee, and call sign. Teams are generally allowed to bring their own transceivers, headphones, microphones, telegraph keys, and contest logging software, but are required to use the antennas provided for them at their assigned station. On-site referees are present to ensure compliance with the WRTC competition rules. Many WRTC site referees are former WRTC competitors.

== See also ==
- Radiosport
