= National Contest Journal =

- National Contest Journal cover, Nov./Dec., 2000.
- Editor: John Pescatore, K3TN
- Categories: Amateur radio
- Frequency: Bimonthly
- Circulation: 2600
- Publisher: American Radio Relay League
- First issue: Jan/Feb, 1973
- Country: USA
- Based in: Newington, Connecticut
- Language: English
- Website: www.ncjweb.com
- ISSN: 0899-0131

The National Contest Journal (also referred to by the acronym NCJ) is a bimonthly magazine published by the American Radio Relay League, with an independent volunteer editor. The magazine covers topics related to amateur radio contesting. NCJ publishes articles aimed at and written by amateur radio operators at all levels of contest still. The magazine is published in English and draws its subscription base primarily from the United States of America and Canada.

== History ==
The National Contest Journal was founded by Minnesotan contester Tod Olson, K0TO. In his editorial for volume 1, issue 1 (January/February, 1973), Olson described the motivational purpose of the publication: "We believe that a genuine desire exists for more information about Radio Contests. Most of us have an interest in learning about other stations, operators, etc that we find in competition with us." Olson relied upon the National Traffic System to gather claimed scores in order to print tables of likely competition winners months before the official results were published by the contest sponsors. Publication for the first three years was done with typewriters and offset printing. Each issue was 16 pages in 5" x 7.5" format. After printing, issues were assembled at Olson's home and mailed from a local post office.

== Editors ==
In over 50 years of publication, the National Contest Journal has had 18 different editors. The first editor, and founder of the magazine, was Tod Olson, K0TO. Olson was one of three editors to have served multiple times in that capacity for the magazine.

Editor	Years
Tod Olson, K0TO	1973-1975
Pete Grillo, W0RTT	1975-1978
Tod Olson, K0TO	1978-1979
Randy Thompson, K5ZD	1979-1980
Tom Taormina, K5RC	1981
John Crovelli, W2GD	1981-1982
Rick Niswander, K7GM	1982-1983
Randy Thompson, K5ZD	1983-1984
Dave Pruett, K8CC	1985-1987
Randy Thompson, K5ZD	1988-1989
Tom Taormina, K5RC	1989-1993
Trey Garlough, N5KO	1993-1994
Bruce Draper, AA5B	1994-1996
Dave Patton, NN1N	1997
Dennis Motschenbacher, K7BV	1998-2002
Carl Luetzelschwab, K9LA	2002-2007
Al Dewey, K0AD	2008-2011
Kirk Pickering, K4RO	2012-2014
Pat Barkey, N9RV	2015-2017
Scott Wright, K0MD	2018-2020
Lee Finkel, KY7M	2021-2023
John Pescatore, K3TN	2024-

== Contest sponsorship ==
The magazine organizes, adjudicates, and publishes the results of two series of annual radio competitions, the North American QSO Party (NAQP) and the North American Sprint. The NAQP has three separate events (for CW, voice, and RTTY) run twice a year, managed by volunteers. The Sprint has two separate events (for CW and RTTY) run twice a year, managed by volunteers. The competitions focus on participation from stations in North America. The National Contest Journal publishes the contest rules and results in the magazine and on the magazine's web site.
