= Friendship Radiosport Games =

International multi-sport event

The Friendship Radiosport Games (FRG) is an international multi-sport event that includes competitions in the various sports collectively referred to as radiosport. The Friendship Radiosport Games began in 1989 as a result of a sister city agreement between Khabarovsk, Russia and Portland, Oregon, United States. Since then, participation has been extended to other sister cities in the Pacific Rim. The Friendship Radiosport Games are generally held in the month of August.

The most recent Friendship Radiosport Games were held on August 19–21, 2016, in Portland, Oregon. Planning for the next games in Khabarovsk is starting with a target date of 2018.

== History ==
The first Friendship Radiosport Games were held in 1989 in Khabarovsk, Russia, which was then still a part of the Soviet Union. The games were organized as a result of the signing of a sister city agreement between the Far Eastern Russia city of Khabarovsk and the city of Portland, Oregon, on the west coast of the United States. The origination of the idea for a friendly radiosport competition between the two cities can be credited to Yevgeny Stavitsky UAØCA, an active amateur radio operator in Khabarovsk. Participants from Portland traveled to Khabarovsk to participate in the games, an event that would not have been possible only a few years before, as the two nations squared off against one another in the Cold War. In 1991, the second Friendship Radiosport Games were held in Portland, hosted by the Friendship Amateur Radio Society, and participants from Khabarovsk traveled to Oregon to attend the event. This would start a tradition of holding the event in August of every odd-numbered year.

Extending the event to additional sister cities, the host for the 1993 Friendship Radiosport Games was Victoria, British Columbia, Canada. In addition to competitors from Canada, Russia, and the United States, competitors from the sister city of Niigata, Japan also came to the event in 1993. The 1995 Friendship Radiosport Games were held in Khabarovsk, Russia for the second time, and representatives from all four cities were in attendance. Tokyo, Japan became the fourth host city for the Friendship Radiosport Games when the event has held there in 1997. The 1999 games returned to Portland, Oregon, United States, where the ARDF event was also designated the IARU Region II Championships, the first such IARU sanctioned championships in the Americas. The event returned to Victoria, British Columbia, Canada in 2001, where for the first time competitors from Melbourne, Victoria, Australia were also in attendance. Breaking with the established pattern, the Friendship Radiosport Games were not held in 2003, but were instead held in 2004, again in Khabarovsk, Russia. The invitation to participation was further extended to radio clubs in the Pacific Rim sister cities of Harbin, China, and Bucheon, Korea.

== Events ==
1. 1989 - Khabarovsk, Russia
2. 1991 - Portland, Oregon, U.S.A.
3. 1993 - Victoria, British Columbia, Canada
4. 1995 - Khabarovsk, Russia
5. 1997 - Tokyo, Japan
6. 1999 - Portland, Oregon, U.S.A.
7. 2001 - Victoria, British Columbia, Canada
8. 2004 - Khabarovsk, Russia
9. 2008 - Portland, Oregon, U.S.A.
10. 2011 - Khabarovsk, Russia
11. 2016 - Portland, Oregon

== Competition ==
The Friendship Radiosport Games have traditionally included events from all of the three activities collectively known as radiosport. This includes HF contesting, Amateur Radio Direction Finding, and High Speed Telegraphy. Some competitors participate in only one of these activities, while others have been competitive in multiple events.

=== Overall Team Competition Winner ===
1989 Team Khabarovsk
1991 Team Portland
1993 Team Khabarovsk
1995 Team Khabarovsk
1997 Team Khabarovsk
1999 Team Portland
2001 Team Portland
2004 Team Khabarovsk
2008 Team Khabarovsk
2011 Team Khabarovsk
2016 Team Khabarovsk

== See also ==
- Amateur radio
- Radiosport
- Contesting
- Amateur Radio Direction Finding
- High Speed Telegraphy
