= Mongolian Amateur Radio Society =

Organization based in Ulaanbaatar, Mongolia

Монголын радио сонирхогчдын холбоо Mongolian Amateur Radio Society
- Abbreviation: MARS
- Type: Non-profit organization
- Purpose: Advocacy, Education
- Location: Ulaanbaatar, Mongolia
- Region served: Mongolia
- Official language: Mongolian
- Website: http://www.qsl.net/jt1kaa/

The Mongolian Amateur Radio Society (MARS; Mongolian: Монголын радио сонирхогчдын холбоо) is a national non-profit organization for amateur radio enthusiasts in Mongolia. Key membership benefits of MARS include the sponsorship of amateur radio operating awards and radio contests. In the spring of 2008, MARS purported to be a successor organization to the Mongolian Radio Sport Federation, and supplied the International Amateur Radio Union with documentation regarding a name change and updated organizational constitution. The name change from Mongolian Radio Sports Federation to Mongolian Amateur Radio Society was recognized by the IARU Region I Executive Committee at its April, 2008 meeting. Subsequent to that meeting, the IARU determined that the name change documentation was not authorized by the Mongolian Radio Sport Federation, which had in fact not changed its name or constitution, and continued to exist as a separate organization. The IARU currently recognizes the MRSF as the IARU member society representing Mongolia.
