= Russian Amateur Radio Union =

Russian organization for amateur radio enthusiasts

Союз радиолюбителей России Russian Amateur Radio Union
- Abbreviation: CPP, SRR
- Formation: 1992
- Type: Non-profit organization
- Purpose: Advocacy, Education
- Location(s): Moscow, Russia KO85st
- Region served: Russia
- Official language: Russian
- President: Igor Grigoriev RV3DA
- Affiliations: International Amateur Radio Union
- Website: http://www.srr.ru/

The Russian Amateur Radio Union (in Russian, Союз радиолюбителей России, Romanized as Soyuz Radiolyubitelei Rossii) is a national non-profit organization for amateur radio enthusiasts in Russia. The organization often uses SRR as its official abbreviation, based on the standard Romanization of the Russian name. The organization was founded in 1992.

SRR promotes amateur radio by sponsoring amateur radio operating awards and radio contests. SRR was the host organization for the 2010 World Radiosport Team Championship, held in Moscow. The SRR also represents the interests of Russian amateur radio operators and shortwave listeners before Russian and international telecommunications regulatory authorities. SRR is the national member society representing Russia in the International Amateur Radio Union.

== See also ==
- International Amateur Radio Union
