= Mongolian Radio Sport Federation =

Organization based in Ulaanbaatar, Mongolia

Монголын Радио Спортын Холбоо Mongolian Radio Sport's Federation
- Abbreviation: MRSF
- Formation: 1967
- Type: Non-profit organization
- Purpose: Amateur Radio
- Location(s): Ulaanbaatar, Mongolia; ON37kw
- Region served: Mongolia
- Official language: Mongolian
- Affiliations: International Amateur Radio Union
- Website: https://sport.gov.mn/radio

The Mongolian Radio Sport's Federation (MRSF; Mongolian: Монголын Радио Спортын Холбоо) is a national non-profit organization for amateur radio enthusiasts in Mongolia. Early activities of the organization focused on radiosport, and the MRSF was active in promoting Amateur Radio Direction Finding competitions throughout the country. MRSF supports local competitions in Amateur Radio Direction Finding as well as a national team that travels to regional and world championship events. Although the MRSF has broadened its scope and now supports many kinds of radio activities, the organization's name continues to reflect this early heritage. MRSF represents the interests of Mongolian amateur radio operators before Mongolian and international telecommunications regulatory authorities. MRSF is the national member society representing Mongolia in the International Amateur Radio Union.

== See also ==
- Mongolian Amateur Radio Society
