= WARC bands =

Amateur radio frequency bands

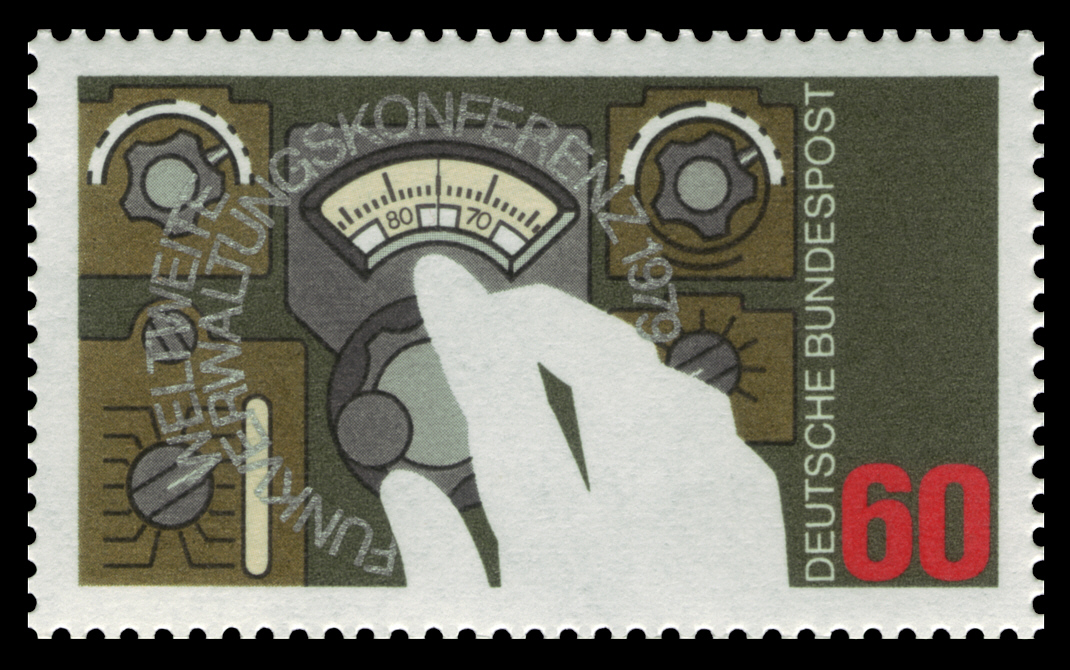
Western German stamp, World Administrative Radio Conference 1979 in Geneva

The World Administrative Radio Conference (WARC) bands are three portions of the shortwave radio spectrum used by licensed and/or certified amateur radio operators. They consist of 30 meters (10.1–10.15 MHz), 17 meters (18.068–18.168 MHz), and 12 meters (24.89–24.99 MHz). They were named after the World Administrative Radio Conference, which in 1979 created a worldwide allocation of these bands for amateur use. The bands were opened for use in the early 1980s. Due to their relatively small bandwidth of 100 kHz or less, there is a gentlemen's agreement that the WARC bands may not be used for general contesting. This agreement has been codified in official recommendations, such as the IARU Region 1 HF Manager's Handbook, which states: "Contest activity shall not take place on the 5, 10, 18, and 24 MHz bands."

Non-contesting radio amateurs are recommended to use the contest-free HF bands (30, 17, and 12m) during the largest international contests.

== 12-meter band plan ==
=== IARU Region 1 ===
| License class | 24.89–24.915 | 24.915-24.925 | 24.925-24.929 | 24.929-24.931 | 24.931-24.94 | 24.94-24.99 |
|---|---|---|---|---|---|---|
| Effective 1 January 2008 | CW only | CW, narrow-band digital | CW, narrow-band digital, unattended stations | Beacons | CW, narrow-band digital, unattended stations | All modes |

=== IARU Region 2 ===
| License class | 24.89–24.915 | 24.915-24.925 | 24.925-24.929 | 24.929-24.931 | 24.931-24.94 | 24.94-24.99 |
|---|---|---|---|---|---|---|
| Effective 1 January 2008 | CW only | CW, narrow-band digital | CW, narrow-band digital, unattended stations | Beacons | CW, narrow-band digital, unattended stations | All modes |

==== Canada ====
Canada is part of region 2 and as such is subject to the IARU band plan. Radio Amateurs of Canada offers the bandplan below as a recommendation for use by radio amateurs in that country.

| License class | 24.89–24.92 | 24.920-24.925 | 24.925-24.94 | 24.94-24.975 | 24.975-24.978 | 24.978-24.99 |
|---|---|---|---|---|---|---|
| Basic (+), Advanced | CW only | Digital only | CW, narrow-band digital, wide band digital | Phone only | TV only | Phone only |

==== United States ====
| License class | 24.89–24.93 | 24.93-24.99 |
|---|---|---|
| Extra, Advanced, General | CW, narrow-band digital | CW, phone, image |

=== IARU Region 3 ===
| License class | 24.89–24.92 | 24.92-24.9295 | 24.9295-24.9305 | 24.94-24.99 |
|---|---|---|---|---|
| Effective as of 2009 | CW only | CW, narrow-band digital | Beacons | All modes 2 kHz max BW |

=== Japan ===
| License class | 24.89–24.900 | 24.900-24.930 | 24.930-24.990 |
|---|---|---|---|
| ALL Class | CW only | CW, narrow-band digital | Narrowband all modes |

== 17-meter band plan ==
=== IARU Region 1 ===
| License class | 18.068-18.095 | 18.095-18.105 | 18.105-18.109 | 18.109-18.111 | 18.111-18.120 | 18.12-18.168 |
|---|---|---|---|---|---|---|
| Effective 1 January 2008 | CW only | CW, narrow-band digital | CW, narrow-band digital, unattended stations | Beacons | All modes, unattended stations | All modes |

=== IARU Region 2 ===
| License class | 18.068-18.095 | 18.095-18.105 | 18.105-18.109 | 18.109-18.111 | 18.111-18.120 | 18.120-18.168 |
|---|---|---|---|---|---|---|
| Effective 1 January 2008 | CW only | CW, narrow-band digital | CW, narrow-band digital, unattended stations | Beacons | All modes, unattended stations | All modes |

==== Canada ====
Canada is part of region 2 and as such is subject to the IARU band plan. Radio Amateurs of Canada offers the bandplan below as a recommendation for use by radio amateurs in that country.

| License class | 18.068-18.095 | 18.095-18.1 | 18.1-18.11 | 18.11-18.168 |
|---|---|---|---|---|
| Basic (+), Advanced | CW only | CW, narrow-band digital, wide band digital | Digital only | Phone only |

==== United States ====
| License class | 18.068-18.11 | 18.11-18.168 |
|---|---|---|
| Extra, Advanced, General | CW, narrow-band digital | CW, phone |

=== IARU Region 3 ===
| License class | 18.068-18.095 | 18.095-18.105 | 18.105-18.1095 | 18.1095-18.1105 | 18.1105-18.168 |
|---|---|---|---|---|---|
| Effective as of 2009 | CW only | CW, narrow-band digital | CW, narrow-band digital, wide band digital | Beacons | All modes |

=== Japan ===
| License class | 18.068-18.08 | 18.08-18.11 | 18.11-18.168 |
|---|---|---|---|
| ALL class | CW only | CW, narrow-band digital | Narrowband all modes |

== 30-meter band plan ==
=== IARU Region 1 ===
| License class | 10.1-10.13 | 10.13-10.15 |
|---|---|---|
| Effective 1 June 2016 | CW only | CW, narrow-band digital |

Throughout most of the world, the 30-meter band generally cannot be used for "phone" (voice) communications. SSB may be used during emergencies involving the immediate safety of life and property and only by stations actually involved in the handling of emergency traffic.

However, a part of Region 1 is permitted to use phone at certain times. The band segment 10.12 to 10.14 may only be used for SSB transmissions in the area of Africa south of the equator during local daylight hours.

=== IARU Region 2 ===
| License class | 10.1-10.13 | 10.13-10.14 | 10.14-10.15 |
|---|---|---|---|
| Effective 1 January 2008 | CW only | CW, narrow-band digital | All modes except phone |

==== Canada ====
Canada is part of Region 2 and as such is subject to the IARU band plan. Radio Amateurs of Canada offers the bandplan below as a recommendation for use by radio amateurs in that country.

| License class | 10.1-10.13 | 10.13-10.14 | 10.14-10.15 |
|---|---|---|---|
| Basic (+), Advanced | CW only | Digital only | CW, narrow-band digital, wide band digital |

==== United States ====
| License class | 10.1-10.15 |
|---|---|
| Extra, Advanced, General (200 watts) | CW, narrow-band digital |

The USA limits amateur radio users to 200 watts peak envelope power on this band.

=== IARU Region 3 ===
| License class | 10.1-10.14 | 10.14-10.15 |
|---|---|---|
| Effective 2009 | CW only | CW, narrow-band digital |

==== Australia ====
Australia (VK, region 3) has a unique set of privileges on 30 meters which allows voice operation on a section of the band for advanced license holders. The digital segment is 10.13-10.15 MHz. The current band plan has telephony from 10.12–10.135 MHz, with CW only below 10.12. These are WIA recommendations only as ACMA does not restrict Australian amateurs' modes within HF allocations beyond requiring less than 8 kHz occupied bandwidth per channel below 28 MHz.

==== Japan ====
| License class | 10.1-10.12 | 10.12-10.15 |
|---|---|---|
| 1st and 2nd | CW only | narrow-band All modes |

Note: The occupied bandwidth shall be less than 2kHz.

== Key for band plans ==
| = CW only |
| = CW, narrow band digital ( <= 500 Hz ) |
| = CW, narrow band digital ( <= 500 Hz ), unattended stations |
| = CW, narrow band digital ( <= 500 Hz ), wide band digital |
| = Beacons |
| = CW, phone |
| = All modes, unattended stations |
| = All modes except phone |
| = Digital only |
| = Phone only |
| = TV only |
| = All modes |

== See also ==
- Amateur radio frequency allocations
- International Telecommunication Union
- World Radiocommunication Conference
- Regional Radiocommunication Conference
- Radio Regulations
- Federal Communications Commission
- Radio Amateurs of Canada
- Ofcom

| Range | Band | ITU Region 1 | ITU Region 2 | ITU Region 3 |
|---|---|---|---|---|
| LF | 2200 m | 135.7–137.8 kHz | | |
| MF | 630 m | 472–479 kHz | | |
| MF | 160 m | 1.810–1.850 MHz | 1.800–2.000 MHz | |
| HF | 80 / 75 m | 3.500–3.800 MHz | 3.500–4.000 MHz | 3.500–3.900 MHz |
| HF | 60 m | 5.3515–5.3665 MHz | | |
| HF | 40 m | 7.000–7.200 MHz | 7.000–7.300 MHz | 7.000–7.200 MHz |
| HF | 30 m^{[t2]} | 10.100–10.150 MHz | | |
| HF | 20 m | 14.000–14.350 MHz | | |
| HF | 17 m^{[t2]} | 18.068–18.168 MHz | | |
| HF | 15 m | 21.000–21.450 MHz | | |
| HF | 12 m^{[t2]} | 24.890–24.990 MHz | | |
| HF | 10 m | 28.000–29.700 MHz | | |
| VHF | 8 m^{[t3]} | 40.000–40.700 MHz | —N/a | |
| VHF | 6 m | 50.000–52.000 MHz (50.000–54.000 MHz)^{[t4]} | 50.000–54.000 MHz | |
| VHF | 5 m^{[t3]} | 58.000–60.100 MHz | —N/a | |
| VHF | 4 m^{[t3]} | 70.000–70.500 MHz | —N/a | |
| VHF | 2 m | 144.000–146.000 MHz | 144.000–148.000 MHz | |
| VHF | 1.25 m | —N/a | 220.000–225.000 MHz | —N/a |
| UHF | 70 cm | 430.000–440.000 MHz | 430.000–440.000 MHz (420.000–450.000 MHz)^{[t4]} | |
| UHF | 33 cm | —N/a | 902.000–928.000 MHz | —N/a |
| UHF | 23 cm | 1.240–1.300 GHz | | |
| UHF | 13 cm | 2.300–2.450 GHz | | |
| SHF | 9 cm | 3.400–3.475 GHz^{[t4]} | 3.300–3.500 GHz | |
| SHF | 5 cm | 5.650–5.850 GHz | 5.650–5.925 GHz | 5.650–5.850 GHz |
| SHF | 3 cm | 10.000–10.500 GHz | | |
| SHF | 1.2 cm | 24.000–24.250 GHz | | |
| EHF | 6 mm | 47.000–47.200 GHz | | |
| EHF | 4 mm^{[t4]} | 75.500 GHz^{[t3]} – 81.500 GHz | 76.000–81.500 GHz | |
| EHF | 2.5 mm | 122.250–123.000 GHz | | |
| EHF | 2 mm | 134.000–141.000 GHz | | |
| EHF | 1 mm | 241.000–250.000 GHz | | |
| THF | Sub-mm | Some administrations have authorized spectrum for amateur use in this region; others have declined to regulate frequencies above 300 GHz. | | |
| [t1] | All allocations are subject to variation by country. For simplicity, only common allocations found internationally are listed. See a band's article for specifics. | | | |
| [t2] | HF allocation created at the 1979 World Administrative Radio Conference. These are commonly called the "WARC bands". | | | |
| [t3] | This is not mentioned in the ITU's Table of Frequency Allocations, but many individual administrations have commonly adopted this allocation under "Article 4.4". | | | |
| [t4] | This includes a currently active footnote allocation mentioned in the ITU's Table of Frequency Allocations. These allocations may only apply to a group of countries. | | | |
See also: Radio spectrum, Electromagnetic spectrum
