= Radiosport =

Formal competition among amateur radio operators

The World Radiosport Team Championship 2002 was held in Helsinki, Finland.

Radiosport (or radio sport) is formal competition among amateur radio operators in any of three amateur radio activities: ARDF, DXing, and contesting. The Friendship Radiosport Games is an international multi-sport event that includes all three types of radiosport.

== History ==
Since 1977, the International Amateur Radio Union has sponsored the IARU HF World Championship (originally named the IARU Radiosport Championship). The World Radiosport Team Championship is another international competition.

== Amateur radio contesting ==
The most common use of the term radiosport is as a synonym for amateur radio contesting (ham radio contesting). Contesting is an activity where amateur radio stations attempt to make as many two-way contacts with other stations as possible, following certain defined parameters of the competition, to maximize a score. At least two specific contests have used the term radiosport in their event names; the IARU HF World Championship, a worldwide contest sponsored by the International Amateur Radio Union, was known as the IARU Radiosport Championship from its inception in 1977 until the name of the contest changed in 1986. The term radiosport also appears in the name of the World Radiosport Team Championship, the radio contest considered by many to be the closest that contesting has to a world championships.

== Amateur radio direction finding ==
The Victorian ARDF Group, a regional ARDF organization in Australia, uses the two-word form of the term radio sport in its logo.

Radiosport also can refer to the sport of amateur radio direction finding (ARDF). Although they represent a broad range of amateur radio interests in their nations today, several member societies of the International Amateur Radio Union were originally formed for the promotion and organization of the sport of ARDF and continue to use the term radiosport in their society name. These include the Radio Sport Federation of Armenia, the Belarusian Federation of Radioamateurs and Radiosportsmen, the Chinese Radio Sports Association, the Kazakhstan Federation of Radiosport and Radio Amateur, the Mongolian Radio Sport Federation, All-Russian public radiosport and radioamateur organization «Soyuz Radiolyubiteley Rossii», Ukrainian League of Radio amateurs and the now defunct Radio Sport Federation of the USSR.

== SOTA (Summits On The Air) ==
Summits or peaks are allocated unique identifiers if the mountain summit meets certain criteria (i.e. height, distance from other peaks) and is allocated potential points to be scored by activating it. There are two ways to score SOTA points; a) as an activator, meaning the operator climbs the summit and makes at least 4 contacts from it or b) as a chaser, that is, an operator who makes contact with an operator on a summit. Summit to summit contacts attract bonus points, as does operating certain summits during pre-defined Winter periods. Certificates are issued at point intervals. Other variants of this radio-sport along the same lines exist, for example WWFF (World Wide Flora and Fauna in Amateur Radio) where activators set up a station in a nature area and chasers contact an operator who is in the nature area.

== RaDAR (Rapid Deployment of Amateur Radio) ==
Originally called SIAS (Shack in a sack), this radio-sport combines speed, a portable station and efficient communications. The operator picks a four hour time-frame within which to operate and deploy their portable station as quickly as possible. Once deployed, the operator makes a maximum of five contacts, exchanging name, signal report and exact (8 digit or more) maidenhead location digits. Once five contacts have been made, the operator packs up the station and moves it at least 1 km on foot or 6 km by car. Other modes of transport are also used, each with its own minimal distance. The operator then deploys their station at the new location, makes five more contacts, packs up and moves again, until the four hours are up. The operator with the highest contact count at the end of the day, for their chosen four hour period of operation, wins.

== High Speed Telegraphy ==
High Speed Telegraphy competitions challenge individuals to correctly receive and copy Morse code transmissions sent at very high speeds. International competitions typically involve several events, some of which are based on simulations of amateur radio activity. One event in the Radioamateur Practicing Tests (RPT) uses a computer program that sends amateur radio call signs at high speed for a specified period of time, and generates a score for the competitor based on errors in copying. Another event is the "pileup" competition, where competitors must copy as many individual call signs as possible while many are being sent simultaneously over a defined period of time.
