= Single operator two radios =

Single operator two radios (SO2R) is an operating practice employed by some competitors in the sport of amateur radio contesting. By using two transceivers attached to separate antennas, competitors can listen to one amateur radio band while transmitting on another. This capability enables the operator to more efficiently locate other amateur radio stations participating in the competition with which to make contact and score points.

== Description ==
Radio contests typically have different operator categories for Single or Multiple people using a single station in the contest. SO2R is an operating technique used by some competitors in the single-operator categories in contesting. While single-operator means that only one transmitter can be active at any time, in SO2R, a single station operator uses two radios to listen simultaneously to two different radio frequencies. When the two radios are on different radio bands, an operator can be listening to one radio while the other is transmitting. This can result in increased operating efficiency, as the operator can always be looking for new contacts to increase his or her score. SO2R operation can be a challenge to learn and requires practice to achieve proficiency.

While SO2R offers the advantage of listening to the second radio while the first is transmitting, this added activity can also become a challenge to the operator. There are some that consider SO2R use in HF contests to be controversial. The critics feel that the extra expense, complexity, and improved performance that can be achieved from SO2R operation merits the separation of SO2R operations into a distinct competitive entry class from other single operators. While no major contests have yet done this, some will list individual scores in contest results with an SO2R designation where the station self-reports that SO2R was used.

SO2R has now been in use for over ten years, becoming a widely accepted practice. While SO2R formalizes the practice of using multiple receivers during a contest, this has always been accepted in the rules of radio contests. Several manufacturers now offer hardware and software specifically aimed at the SO2R operator.

== Callsign ==
SO2R is also a valid amateur radio callsign issued to an active contest station in Poland.
