= Five Nine =

Japanese amateur radio magazine

- Categories: Amateur radio
- Frequency: Monthly
- Founded: 1984
- Final issue: September 2014
- Country: Japan
- Based in: Tokyo
- Language: Japanese
- Website: Official website

Five Nine (also referred to as 59) was a monthly magazine published in Tokyo, Japan. The magazine was established in 1984. It stributed in Japan. The name of the magazine is derived from the international amateur radio R-S-T system report of 59, indicating the highest level of signal readability and signal strength. The 59 signal report is commonly used in radio DXing, regardless of the actual signal readability or strength of the station receiving the report.

The magazine organized, adjudicated, and published the results of an annual international radio competition, the Japan International DX Contest, which focused on encouraging communications between amateur radio stations in Japan with other amateur radio stations around the world.

Five Nine ceased publication in September 2014.
