= High-speed telegraphy =

Type of radiosport

In amateur radio, high-speed telegraphy (HST) is a form of radiosport that challenges amateur radio operators to accurately receive and copy, and in some competitions to send, Morse code transmissions sent at very high speeds. This event is most popular in Eastern Europe. The International Amateur Radio Union (IARU) sponsors most of the international competitions.

== History ==
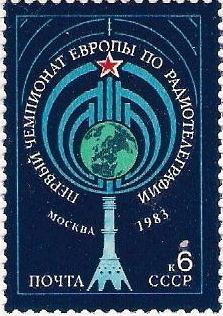
The first European Championship in wireless telegraphy, Moscow 1983. Ostankino Tower. Post of USSR, 1983.

The first international high-speed telegraphy competition was the HST European Championship held in Moscow, Russia, in 1983. Two more HST European Championships were held; one in 1989 in Hannover, Germany, and another in 1991 in Neerpelt, Belgium. The first HST World Championship was held in Siófok, Hungary, in 1995. A world championship has been held in every odd-numbered year since then.

Most international, national, and local HST competitions are held in the countries of the former Eastern Bloc. Every world championship has been held in Europe. While many competitors are licensed amateur radio operators, there is no requirement that competitors have an amateur radio license, and many pursue the sport without one.

== Competition events ==
The 2003 HST World Championships were hosted in Minsk, Belarus.

There are three main competitive events at HST meets. One standard event is the copying or sending of five-character groups of text. Two of the events are based on simulations of amateur radio activity and are referred to as the Radioamateur Practicing Tests (RPT). The RPT includes the copying of amateur radio call signs and a "pileup" competitions, where competitors must distinguish between call signs sent during several simultaneous transmissions. Not all competitors are required to enter every competition, and some competitors specialize in just one competitive event.

In the five character groups event, random letters and numbers are sent in Morse code, five characters at a time, at a high speed. Separate competitions are held for the reception of just the twenty-six letters of the Latin alphabet, just the ten Arabic numerals, or a mixed content of letters, numbers, and some punctuation symbols. Competitors may choose to record the text by hand on paper or by typing on a computer keyboard. The competition starts with one minute of transmission sent at an initial speed defined for the entry category (usually 50 letters per minute for juniors and 80 letters per minute for the other age categories). After each test, the copy of the competitors is judged for errors. Subsequent tests are each conducted at an increased speed until no competitor remains who can copy the text without excessive error.

In addition to reception tests, some competitions feature transmission tests where competitors must try to send five character groups in Morse code as fast as possible. Competitors send a printed message of five character groups at a specific speed, which is judged for its accuracy by a panel of referees. Like the receiving tests, there are separate competitions for sending five character groups of just the twenty-six letter of the Latin alphabet, just the ten Arabic numerals, or a mixed content of letters, numbers, and some punctuation symbols. Most transmission tests restrict the type of equipment that may be used to send the Morse code message.

The Amateur Radio Call Sign Receiving Test use a software program called RufzXP that generates a score for each competitor. Rufz is the abbreviation of the German word "Rufzeichen-Hören" which means "Listening to Call Signs". In the RufzXP program, competitors listen to an amateur radio call sign sent in Morse code and must enter that call sign with the computer keyboard. If the competitor types in the call sign correctly, their score improves and the speed at which the program sends subsequent call signs increases. If the competitor types in the call sign incorrectly, the score is penalized and the speed decreases. Only one call sign is sent at a time and the event continues for a fixed number of call signs (usually 50). Competitors can choose the initial speed at which the program sends the Morse code, and the winner is the competitor with the highest generated score.

The Pileup Trainer Test simulates a "pileup" situation in on-air amateur radio operating where numerous stations are attempting to establish two-way contact with one particular station at the same time. This competition uses a software program called MorseRunner. In the MorseRunner software, more than one amateur radio call sign is sent at a time. Each call sign is sent in Morse code generated at different audio frequencies and speeds, timed to overlap each other. Competitors must record as many of the call signs as they can during a fixed period of time. They may choose to do this either by recording the call signs by hand on paper, or by typing them in with a computer keyboard. The winner is the competitor with the most correctly recorded call signs.

The rules of international and European championships are defined in the document IARU Region 1 Rules for High Speed Telegraphy Championships.

== Entry categories ==
HST competitions generally separate the competitors into different categories based on age and gender. The following are the entry categories specified in the IARU rules used for European and World Championships:

- Women aged 16 years and younger (A).
- Men aged 16 years and younger (B).
- Women aged 17 to 21 years old (C).
- Men aged 17 to 21 years old (D).
- Women, regardless of their age (E).
- Men, regardless of their age (F).
- Women aged 40 years and older (G).
- Men aged 40 to 49 years old (H).
- Men aged 50 years and older (I).

Note that there is an additional male category, which is justified by the high number of participants in the corresponding age group. A maximum of 18 competitors from those 9 categories can take part as a national team.

== Past IARU Championships ==
IARU World Championships take place in odd year, starting 1995. Since 2004, an IARU Region 1 Championship takes place each even year.

- 2016 Herceg-Novi, Montenegro
- 2014 Bar, Montenegro
- 2012 Beatenberg, Switzerland
- 2009 Obzor, Bulgaria
- 2008 Pordenone, Italy
- 2007 Belgrade, Republic of Serbia
- 2006 Primorsko, Bulgaria
- 2005 Ohrid, Republic of Macedonia
- 2004 Niš, Republic of Serbia
- 2003 Minsk, Belarus
- 2001 Constanţa, Romania
- 1999 Pordenone, Italy
- 1997 Sofia, Bulgaria
- 1995 Siófok, Hungary

== Regional Championships ==
- 2013 1st Balkan High Speed Telegraphy Championship, 31 May - 2 June, 2013. Lovech, Bulgaria
- 2014 2nd Balkan High Speed Telegraphy Championship, 13–15 June 2014. Piatra Neamţ, România
- 2015 3rd Balkan High Speed Telegraphy Championship, 15-17 May, 2015. Svilajnac, Serbia

== 13th IARU World HST Championship ==
13th IARU World HST Championship was held in Herceg-Novi, Montenegro from 21 till 25 September 2016. Competing in 9 categories with 8 types of tests, there was more than 120 competitors from 21 countries around the world.

Top ten team scores
Rank	Country	Score
1	Belarus	6397.9
2	Russia	5515.5
3	Romania	4777.6
4	Hungary	3079.9
5	Bulgaria	2340.7
6	United States	1708.4
7	Switzerland	1564.2
8	Germany	915.6
9	Serbia	806.0
10	Mongolia	669.7

World records
Callsign	Name	M/F	Team	Test	Record	Old record
EW8NK	Hanna Shavialenka	F	Belarus	Receiving Figures	310	310
EW8NK	Hanna Shavialenka	F	Belarus	Receiving Mixed	240	240
RA4FVL	Anna Sadukova	F	Russia	Receiving Mixed	240	240

== IARU world records ==
The IARU Region 1 HST working group maintains a list of HST world records, set at official IARU HST competitions. Top speeds vary strongly between the different events of the competition and categories. While reception and transmission of letter groups are limited to approximately 300 characters per minute, mainly due to physiologic difficulties in sending or writing at high speeds respectively, the maximum speeds in the RufzXP competition are more than twice as fast.

Note that the system to measure the telegraphy speed at IARU HST events has changed. Before 2004, the PARIS standard was used, which has since been changed to real characters. Old records have been recalculated accordingly.

== Successful teams ==
The sum of all team scores of the top ten nations from all HST events since 1999 are tabulated below. Note that some teams did not take part in all competitions. Last updated in September 2009 after the World Championships in Obzor, Bulgaria.

Top ten team scores
Rank	Score	Country	Entries
1	48286.2	Belarus	9
2	45237.4	Russia	9
3	34874.8	Romania	9
4	26858.5	Hungary	9
5	13140.5	North Macedonia	9
6	12902.3	Bulgaria	9
7	10365.1	Serbia	7
8	9631.1	Ukraine	9
9	8961.4	Germany	9
10	7449.7	Czech Republic	6

== See also ==
- Friendship Radiosport Games
- Theodore Roosevelt McElroy
- Morse code
- Prosigns for Morse code
- Telegraph key
- Telegraphy
- Telegraphist
