= Twisted Oak Winery =

American winery located in California

Coordinates: 38.08597°N 120.48845°W

- Location: Vallecito, California, USA
- Appellation: Calaveras County
- Founded: 2001
- First vintage: 2002
- Key people: Jeff and Mary Stai, Founders; Ryan Teeter, Winemaker
- Cases/yr: 8,000
- Known for: The Spaniard
- Varietals: Tempranillo, Grenache, Syrah, Petite Sirah, Graciano, Mourvedre, Viognier, Verdelho, Marsanne, Roussanne
- Distribution: United States, limited
- Tasting: open to public
- Website: http://www.twistedoak.com/

Twisted Oak Winery was a family-owned boutique winery in Vallecito, California specializing in wine made from grape varieties native to the Mediterranean regions of western Europe. The winery was located on a hilltop at 2280 ft (695 m) above sea level in the foothills of the Sierra Nevada Mountains, and most of the grapes for the wines are sourced from nearby vineyards in Calaveras County. The winery name and logo design are derived from a California Blue Oak tree on the property. The winery closed in September 2024.

== History ==
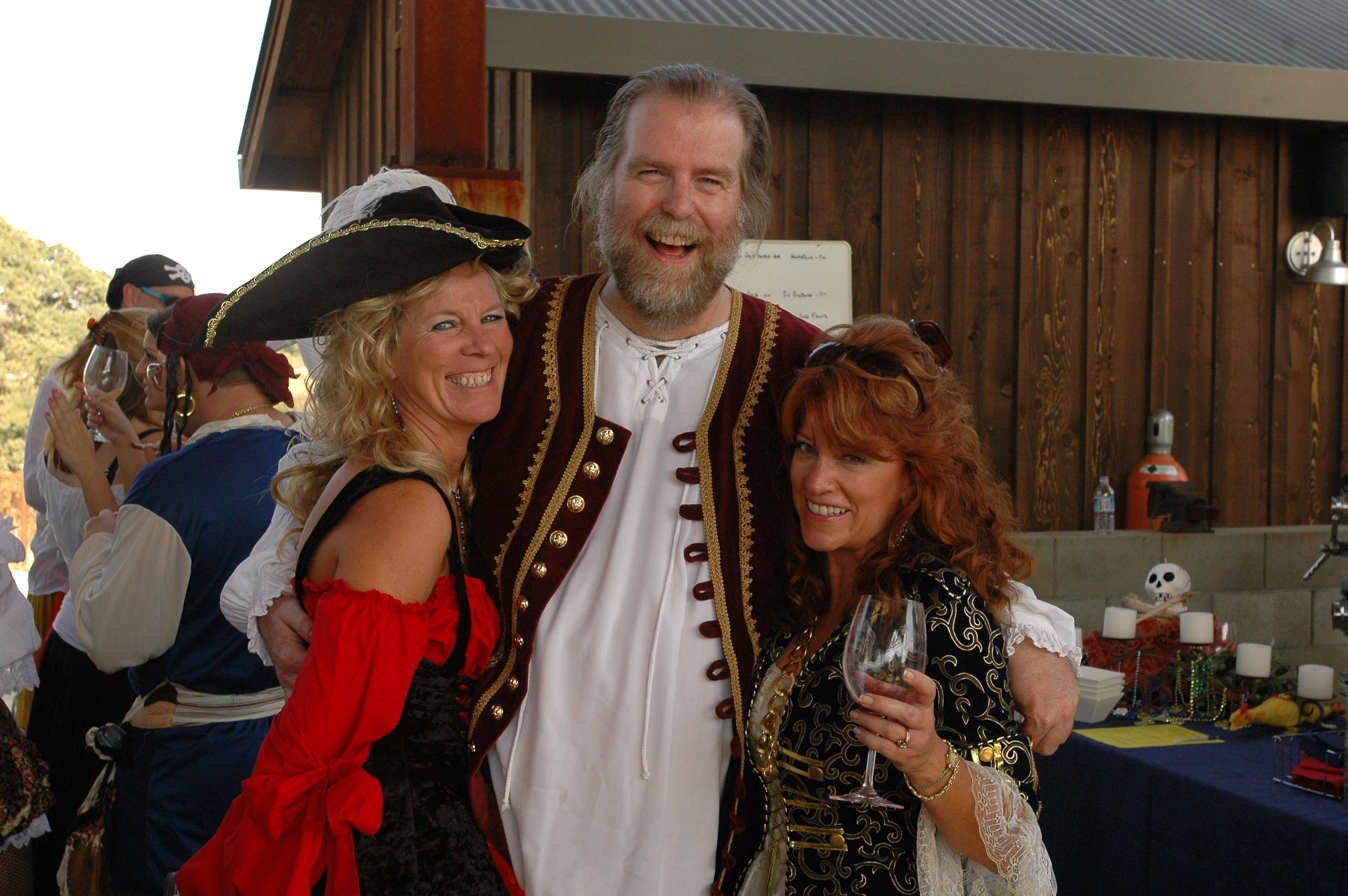
Jeff Stai (middle), owner of Twisted Oak, at a release party for one of their wines.

The winery was founded by Jeff and Mary Stai, and opened in 2001. The Stais hired Scott Klann, a native of Murphys, who had over a decade of experience in the Calaveras County wine industry, as Twisted Oak's first winemaker. The original 10 acre (4 ha) vineyard on the 120 acre (48.5 ha) property was planted to Tempranillo, Grenache, and Graciano, grape varieties native to the Mediterranean regions of France, Spain and Portugal. The decision to plant Iberian grape varieties, uncommon in California, was in part due to a dinner that Stai and Klann attended at a Spanish restaurant in which they tried many Spanish wines that impressed them.

The winery's first vintage was 2002, when they produced 10 different wines, all made from purchased grapes. The wines were produced in a custom crush facility at the Olde Lockeford Winery in the town of Lockeford, California. The first vintage began a tradition of naming wines with exclusively non-alphabetic symbols (in a style often used to replace profane words in written English), such as the *%#&@!, a red blend of Mourvedre, Syrah, and Grenache grapes, and the %@#$!, a white wine made of Marsanne and Roussanne grapes (introduced two years later). The unusual wine names were inspired from the owner and winemaker's frustration at being unable to come up with a good name for the red blend. The unique wine labels have been the subject of doctoral research in communications. The 2002 Calaveras County The Spaniard would be well received by wine critics, scoring 92 points in a review for Wine Enthusiast magazine.

With their own winery facility still under construction, Twisted Oak's 2003 vintage was produced at the facilities of Hatcher Winery in the nearby town of Murphys. The winery opened a tasting room on Main Street in Murphys in July 2003. The tasting room is located in the childhood home of Albert Abraham Michelson, the first American to win a Nobel Prize in the sciences (in 1907, for physics). The winery's own winemaking facility and estate tasting room were completed in July 2004, and included a 300 ft (91 m) cave for barrel storage. The winery's first vintage at the Vallecito hilltop facility was 2004, and it produced 14 different wines. Seven of the wines carried the Calaveras County appellation designation, and five were sold under the Sierra Foothills AVA appellation designation. Some of the wines were estate grown and others were made from grapes grown in the Tanner and Dalton Vineyards of Calaveras County or the Sumu Kaw Vineyard in El Dorado County. In the vintages since the winery's completion, Twisted Oak has bottled between 8,000 and 14,000 cases of wine. The winery facility is designed to support the production of 13,000 to 14,000 cases of wine at capacity.

For the 2007 vintage, about 20% of the grapes used by the winery were estate-grown, including all the fruit for The Spaniard and Torcido label wines, with the rest purchased from other vineyards. A tasting room at the winery is open to the public daily, and a tasting room on Main Street in downtown Murphys is open year round. The winery also has its own wine club, which it calls "The Twisted Few".

== Wines and vineyards ==
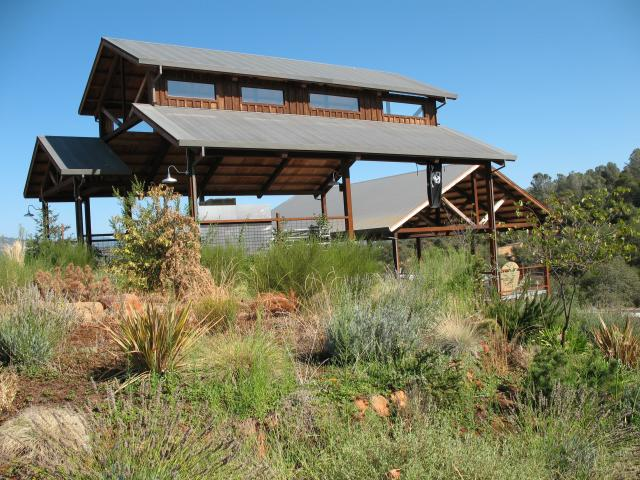
A portion of the winery facility at Twisted Oak Winery

Twisted Oak Winery produced both red and white wines made from the grape varieties native to Spain and southern France. White wines included varietal Viognier and Verdelho bottlings as well as blends made from Marsanne, Rousanne, and Viognier. The winery produced one rosé made from Grenache. The winery's signature red wine bottling, The Spaniard, was a blend of Tempranillo, Grenache, and Graciano grapes. Other red bottlings include varietal Tempranillo, Syrah, Petite Sirah, and Grenache bottlings, as well as red blends made with grapes including Cabernet Sauvignon, Mourvedre, Petit Verdot, Syrah, and Grenache. The winery aged their waines in American, French, and Hungarian Oak barrels. In 2007, the 2003 Syrah and the 2003 Spaniard both won gold medals in the San Francisco Chronicle Wine Competition. Two of Twisted Oak Winery's wines won gold medals at the Orange County Fair. Later in the year, the Torcido won a double-gold and the Tempranillo won Best of Sierra Foothills AVA appellation at the California Exposition and State Fair.

The winery had two estate vineyards, one located on the property in Vallecito, and the other located on property owned by the winery near Murphys. The winery purchased grapes from ten other vineyards in Calaveras County and three in other parts of California. Silvaspoons Vineyard, located in the Alta Mesa AVA, was the only vineyard outside of the Sierra Foothills AVA from which Twisted Oak Winery sources grapes.

== Custom releases ==
To help promote the winery, owner Jeff Stai has personally donated about 50 bottles of wine each year for use as trophies in recognition of winning category performances in the California QSO Party, an annual amateur radio competition. About half of the wines are awarded to competitors in California and half to those outside of California. The wine trophies are personalized with custom front labels.

== See also ==
- California wine
