= Contest logging software =

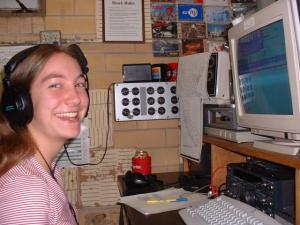
The use of a computer to log contacts has become an integral part of radio contesting.

Contest logging software refers to specialized computer software programs designed for use by competitors in amateur radio contesting. Most contest logging software is written by individual programmers who are active radio contesters.

== Purpose ==
The primary purpose of contest logging software is to record the details of two-way radio contacts made during amateur radio contests. At a minimum, these details include the time, band or frequency of operation, the call sign of the other station, and the received "exchange" data. This log data is recorded in a binary or ASCII format. Most contest logging software packages will also compute a running score for the contest during operation and will help track which multipliers have been "worked" and which have not. Typical contest logging software includes features for post-contest processing of the log to prepare it for submission to the contest sponsor. There is great variation in the features offered and their specific implementation, which can lead to passionate debates among the supporters of specific software packages.

== Common features ==
Many programs offer advanced features for controlling external devices; this can include controlling the frequency of a radio, sending Morse code over a serial port or parallel port interface, interfacing with sound cards used for the transmission and reception of digital modes such as RTTY, or controlling antenna or amplifier hardware. Some software programs include specific features for single operator two radios (SO2R) operations. A related market exists for software designed to analyze, convert, or manipulate log data recorded during radio contests.

Contest logging software, whether free or commercial, is available for DOS, Linux, and Windows platforms. Some contesters dedicate older computers specifically to running their favorite contest logging software.
