= Olde Lockeford Winery =

American winery located in California

- Location: Lockeford, California, USA
- Coordinates: 38.15356°N 121.16271°W
- Appellation: Lodi AVA
- Formerly: Lockeford Cooperative Winery
- Founded: 1998
- First vintage: 2000
- Key people: Don Litchfield, Owner
- Cases/yr: < 2500
- Varietals: Mourvedre, Sangiovese, Zinfandel, Petite Verdot, Merlot, Petite Sirah, Cabernet Sauvignon, Barbera, Chardonnay, Viognier
- Distribution: United States direct sales only
- Tasting: open to public
- Website: http://www.vinopiazza.com/oldelockeford/

Olde Lockeford Winery is a winery and custom crush facility in Lockeford, California, United States. The winery was founded in 1946 as the Lockeford Cooperative Winery, but had closed more than a decade before being purchased by Don Litchfield in 1998. The winery complex was renamed Vino Piazza, and reconfigured to house multiple "micro-wineries". Olde Lockeford Winery is one of several wineries in the complex. In addition to the wineries that lease space in the Vino Piazza, the facility also offers a custom crush facility that can be leased by winery operations in other parts of the state.

== History ==
Olde Lockeford Winery was founded in 1946 as the Lockeford Cooperative Winery. The winery had closed by the 1970s, and the site suffered from environmental damage. Don Litchfield purchased the 75,000 square feet (6,968 m^{2}) facility in 1998 intending to remodel the space to resemble a Tuscan castle that would house a wine museum. After discussing the project with Mark Chandler, executive director of the Lodi-Woodbridge Winegrape Commission, Litchfield decided to convert the facility into a site where multiple "micro-wineries" could occupy shared space and facilities. Investing over $3 million in the project, Litchfield renamed the facility Vino Piazza and called his own winery operation at the facility Olde Lockeford Winery.

== Wines and vineyards ==
Like other wineries at Vino Piazza, Olde Lockeford Winery produces less than 2500 cases of wine per year. Most of the grapes used by Olde Lockeford Winery comes from vineyards in the nearby regions in the Lodi AVA. Olde Lockeford Winery produces a wide variety of wines, including varietal Mourvedre, Sangiovese, Petit Verdot, Merlot, Petite Sirah, Cabernet Sauvignon, Barbera, Riesling, Viognier, Chardonnay, Muscat Canelli, and Black Muscat. They also produce a small number of blended wines, a sparkling wine, a rosé, and several dessert wines.
