= YASME Foundation =

Non-profit involved with amateur radio

Yasme Foundation
- Logo of the Yasme Foundation; the legendary yacht – Yasme – appears on the left.
- Formation: 1960
- Type: Non-profit corporation
- Headquarters: Castro Valley, CA, United States
- President and Director: Ward Silver
- Revenue: $23,079 (2016)
- Expenses: $40,648 (2016)
- Website: "yasme.org".

The Yasme Foundation is a non-profit corporation organized to conduct scientific and educational projects related to amateur radio, including DXing (long distance communication) and the introduction and promotion of amateur radio in underdeveloped countries. It is located in Castro Valley, California.

== History ==
The foundation was established in 1960 and named after the legendary yacht Yasme, the boat that carried Danny Weil on “DXpeditions” to many remote places from which he operated amateur radio, sometimes for the first time. (Note: Cain, James (2003). Yasme: The Danny Weil and Colvin Radio Expeditions. American Radio Relay League (ARRL). ISBN 978-0872598935. ISBN 0-87259-893-4 — also called “The Yasme book”.) Initially the main purpose of the Yasme Foundation was to help raise money for Weil's expeditions and to organize the distribution of his QSL cards. He was one of the first to travel to more than one location to operate, and to travel from place to place, often solo in a sailboat and lugging hundreds of pounds of radio equipment, specifically to provide DXers with a ‘new one’. When he retired from amateur radio, the foundation closely cooperated with the radio expeditions of Lloyd and Iris Colvin. The Colvins perfected the DXpedition and took it into the modern age in the 1970s and 1980s, with operations from more than 100 countries, using modern transport methods and state of the art radio equipment.

== Foundation Award ==
The Yasme Foundation offers the Yasme Trophy and the Yasme Plaque to anyone who submits QSL cards showing contacts with 30 different callsigns of Yasme officers, directors and/or operations.
