= Amateur radio station =

Station receiving radio waves

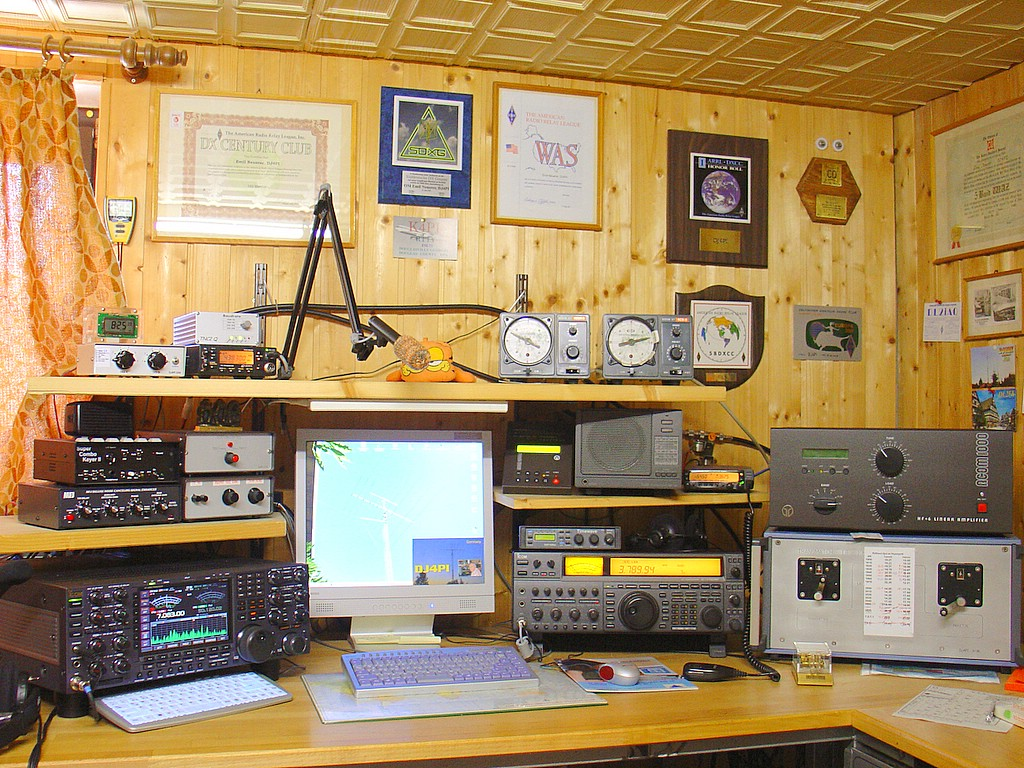
Fixed station of a German amateur radio operator

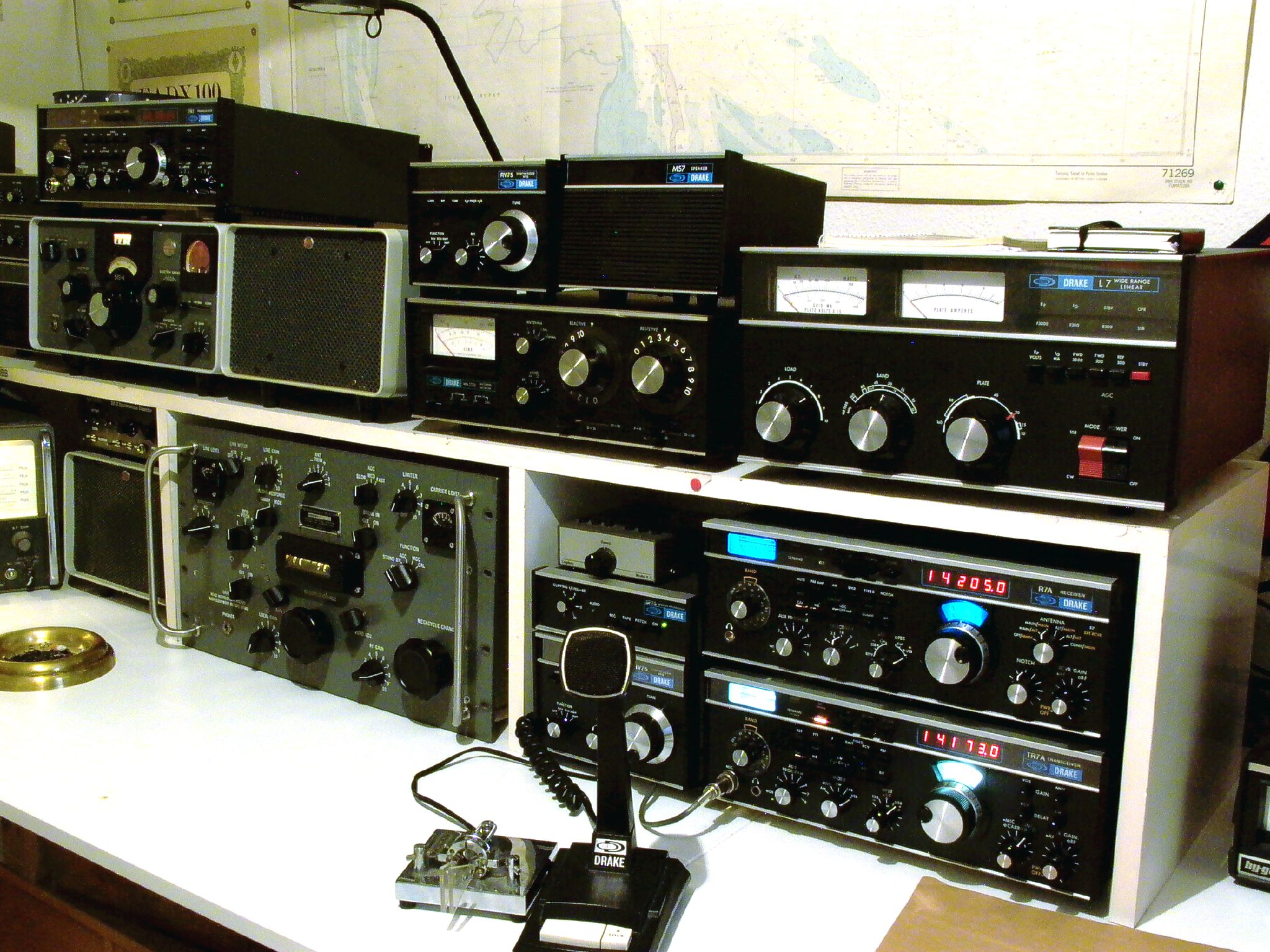
Fixed amateur radio station in the United States featuring vintage equipment

An amateur radio station is a radio station designed to provide radiocommunications in the amateur radio service for an amateur radio operator. Radio amateurs build and operate several types of amateur radio stations, including fixed ground stations, mobile stations, space stations, and temporary field stations. A slang term often used for an amateur station's location is the shack, named after the small enclosures added to the upperworks of naval ships to hold early radio equipment and batteries.

== Types of stations ==
=== Fixed stations ===
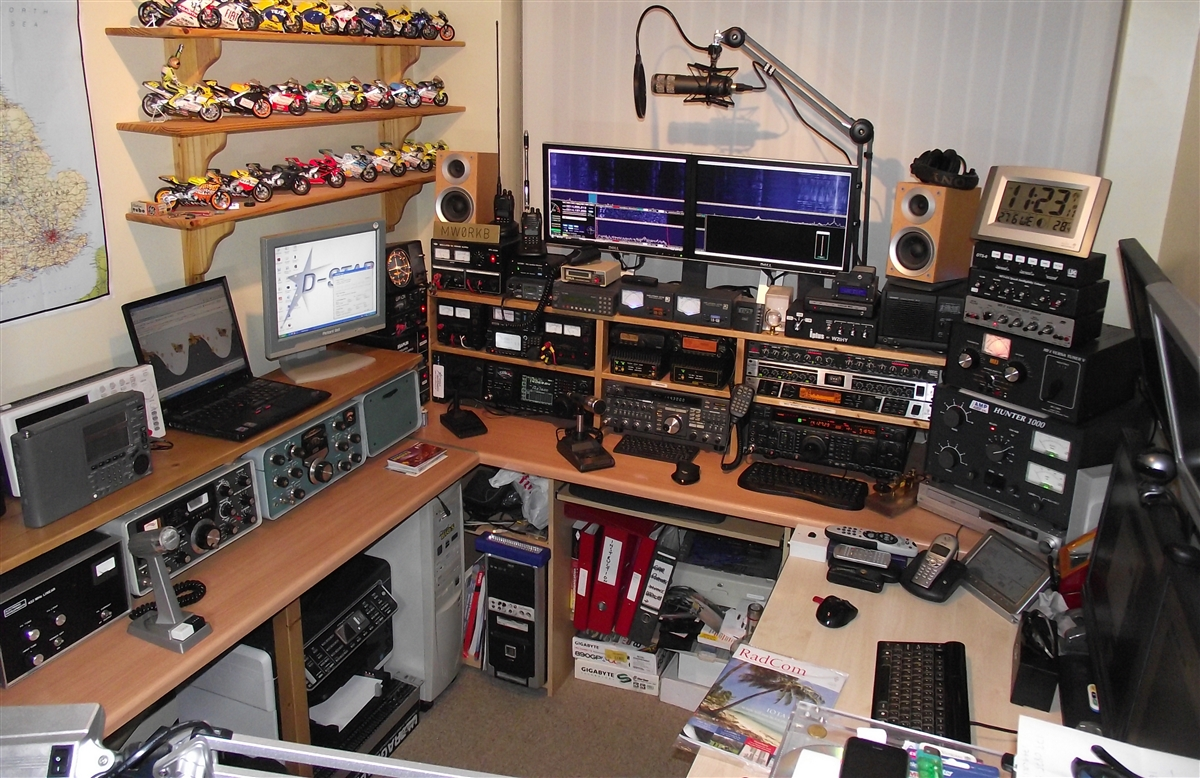
An amateur fixed station in the United Kingdom.

An amateur radio station established in a permanent structure with equipment that is not intended for portable operation is referred to as a fixed station. This is the most common form of amateur radio station, and can be found in homes, schools, and some public buildings. A typical fixed station is equipped with a transceiver and one or more antennas. For voice communications, the station will be equipped with a microphone; for communications using Morse code, a telegraph key is common; and for communications over digital modes such as RTTY and PSK31, a station will be equipped with a specialized interface to connect the transceiver to a computer sound card. While not a requirement for radiocommunications, most fixed amateur radio stations are equipped with one or more computers, which serve tasks ranging from logging of contacts with other stations to various levels of station hardware control. Fixed stations might also be equipped with amplifiers, antenna rotators, SWR meters, antenna tuners, and other station accessories.

Fixed stations are generally powered from the AC mains electrical supply available in the building. Some equipment in fixed stations may run off low voltage DC instead of AC, and require a separate power supply. Some fixed stations are equipped with auxiliary sources of power, such as electrical generators or batteries for use in emergencies.

=== Mobile stations ===
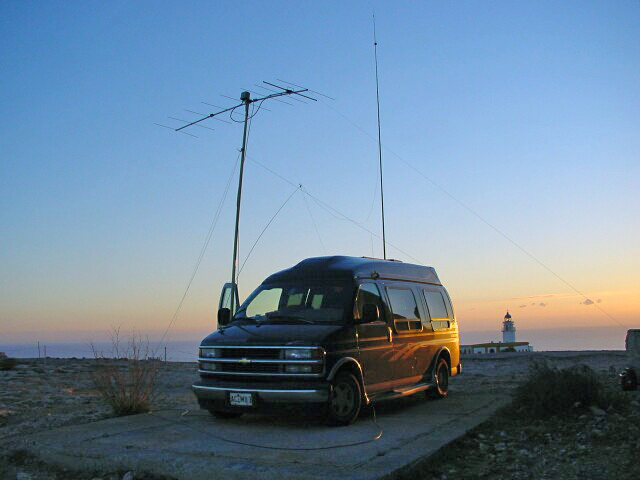
An amateur mobile radio station.

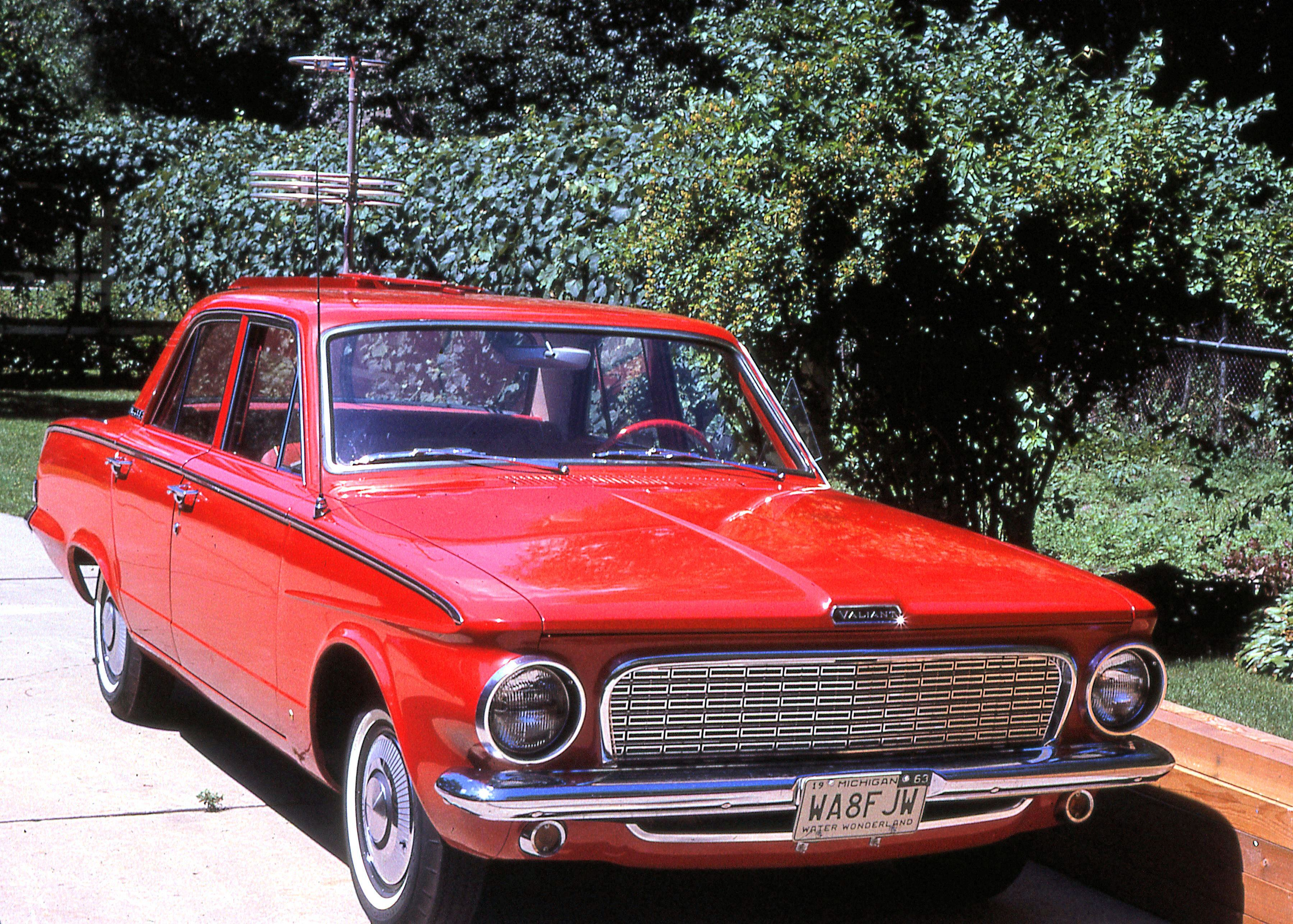
Mobile Station WA8FJW with roof-mounted Halo antennas for 6-meter and 2-meter communication.

An amateur radio station installed in a vehicle is referred to as a mobile station. A typical mobile station is equipped with a transceiver, one or more antennas, and a microphone. The transceiver may be specially designed for installation in vehicles. It may be much smaller than transceivers designed for fixed station use, to facilitate installation under a seat or in a trunk, and it may feature a detachable control head that can be mounted in a separate location from the rest of the radio. Antennas designed for mobile stations must accommodate the unique physical constraints of the vehicle and travel lanes which it occupies, allowing for clearance under overpasses and bridges, and safe passage by vehicles in adjacent lanes. Most antennas used in mobile stations are omnidirectional. Few mobile stations are equipped to communicate with Morse code or digital modes. Most mobile stations are designed to be operated by the vehicle operator while driving.

Most transceivers installed in vehicles are designed to run on 12-16 VDC, and are generally powered by the starting battery in the vehicle. Because of the power demands placed on the vehicle battery, most mobile stations either do not include external amplifiers or include amplifiers with power outputs that are more modest than those commonly found in fixed stations.

A specialized form of mobile station used for competition in a VHF amateur radio contest in North America is called a rover station. A rover station is often designed to be operated by a passenger in the vehicle rather than the driver, and may include multiple transceivers, transverters, directional antennas, and a laptop computer to log contacts made.

While it may not be a regulatory requirement, many mobile stations will append a /M to end of their call sign (pronounced as "slash mobile" on phone) while operating to identify themselves to other stations as a mobile station. Rover station operating in a VHF contest will append a /R to the end of their call sign (pronounced "slash rover").

Maritime mobile stations are mobile stations installed in a watercraft, usually an ocean-going vessel. When in international waters, these stations are operated under the regulatory authority of the flag under which the vessel is registered. In addition to the regulatory requirements of amateur radio, operation of maritime mobile stations also requires the permission of the captain of the vessel. Maritime mobile stations append a /MM to end of their call sign (pronounced as "slash maritime mobile").

Aeronautical mobile stations are mobile stations installed in an aircraft. In addition to the regulatory requirements of amateur radio, operation of aeronautical mobile stations also requires the permission of the pilot of the aircraft. Aeronautical mobile stations append a /AM to end of their call sign (pronounced as "slash aeronautical mobile").

==== Portable stations ====
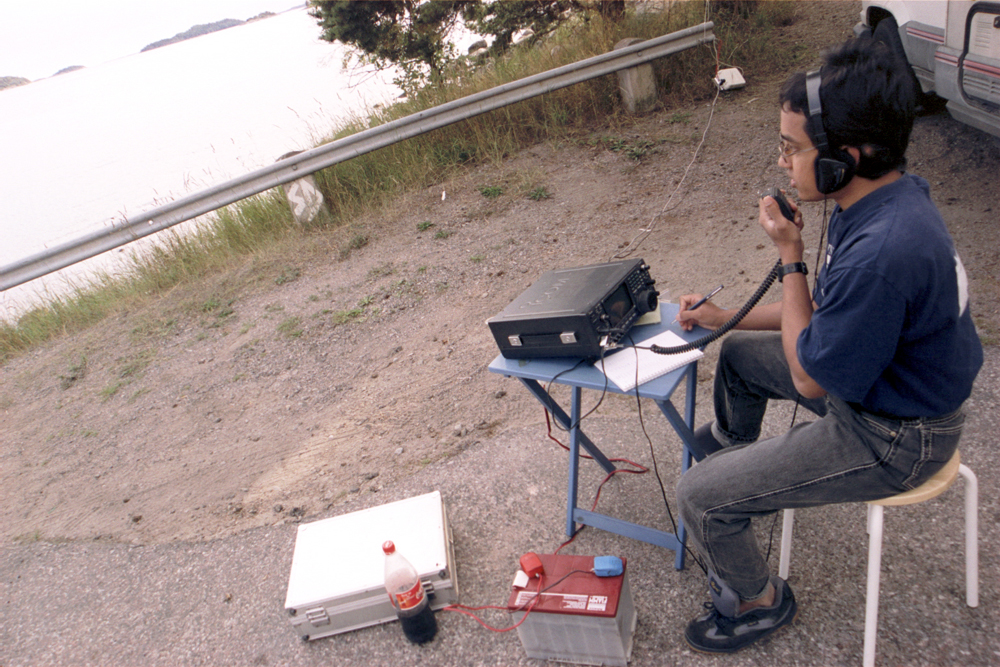
An amateur radio operator at a portable amateur radio station.

An amateur radio station set up in a temporary location is referred to as a portable station. A portable station might be established to provide emergency communications in a disaster area, to provide public service communications during a large organized event such as a charity bicycle ride, to provide communications during an expedition, or for the recreational enjoyment of operating outdoors. Portable stations include the same basic equipment as fixed and mobile stations, although transportation of the transceiver, antennas, power supplies or batteries and necessary accessories often influences the particular selection. Equipment that does not weigh very much, or that can be broken down for shipment or transportation in luggage is especially popular with amateur radio operators travelling on DX-peditions.

Most portable stations rely upon generator or battery power. Because this form of power might be of limited supply, portable stations often operate at lower transmitter power output to conserve energy.

Some portable stations append a /P to end of their call sign (pronounced as "slash portable") to indicate their status as a portable operation. In some countries, this is a regulatory requirement, whereas in others it is done at the option of the operator.

=== Space stations ===
An amateur radio station that is located in a satellite, the Space Shuttle, or on the International Space Station is referred to as a space station. Some countries, including the United States, have additional or different regulations regarding the operation of space stations than other amateur radio stations. Most space stations are located on satellites that orbit the Earth. These stations are frequently either transponders or repeaters that operate under automatic control and can be used by ground stations (any station that is not a space station) to relay their signal to other ground stations.

=== Handheld stations ===
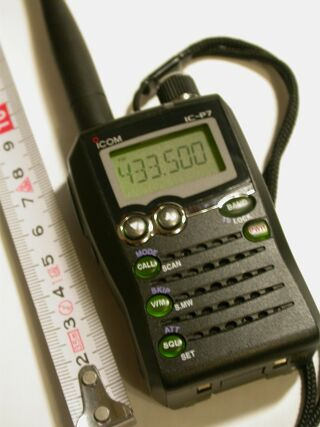
A handheld VHF/UHF transceiver, 2007.

Handheld radios contain all the necessary equipment for radiocommunications with another station. A typical radio used as a handheld station integrates a transceiver with an antenna and a battery in one handheld package. Most handheld transceivers used in amateur radio are designed for operation on the VHF or UHF amateur radio bands and most often are capable of only FM voice communications transmissions. To conserve battery power, they have limited transmitter power, often below 1W, to cover a local range of typically a few km or miles.

=== Repeater stations ===
An amateur radio repeater is a specialty amateur radio station that extends the range of communications for other stations. A repeater uses a receiver tuned to one radio frequency and a transmitter tuned to another radio frequency. Other stations using a repeater station transmit on one frequency but listen for signals on the other frequency. If a repeater station is in a favorable location, such as on a tall tower, the top of a tall building, or on a mountaintop, stations that otherwise would not be able to communicate with each other can each use the repeater and establish two-way communications.

Repeater stations generally operate under automatic control. The control equipment is responsible for transmitting the repeater station's call sign at regular intervals. This identification is often done in Morse code. Some US repeater stations append a /R to end of their call sign or not (used to be required in the 80s and early 90s but no longer). Some may still have a vanity "WR#xxx" repeater license where #=0 thru 9 and xxx is any 3 letter combo but these callsigns won't be renewed and will be forced to change when their current license expires.

== Computer-control software ==
Some modern amateur transceivers have embedded computers with firmware which is executed to provide the functions and features of the transceiver. This software must be provided by the original manufacturer of the equipment. Another type of software is that required to control a receiver (or transceiver) without a front panel provided. Examples of this are the Kenwood TS-B2000 and the Ten-Tec Pegasus; both transceivers are sold with PC software to provide the human interface for operation. Most transceivers with front control panels (and many receivers popular among shortwave listeners) have a computer interface such as a serial port, USB or Ethernet port. These ports are useful for satellite-tracking frequency control (Doppler tuning), station logging, digital operation, internet and special-needs accessibility. In many cases, the software adds improved or extra functions and features beyond those provided by the original design. For this reason, some operators purchase radio-control software for non-computerized operation even if their radio has a front control panel.

== Station identification ==
During transmissions, an amateur radio station must identify itself with a call sign issued by the authorized regulatory authority of the country in which the station is located.

Most regulatory agencies worldwide issue amateur radio call signs to the operator licensee, and not to the station: In effect, any radio transmitter a licensed operator touches the controls of, becomes the radio station on that amateur's license. An amateur radio station may be operated under the call sign of the owner of the station (if they are near the controls), or the call sign of the person operating the station as a guest.

In some countries, special call signs might be made available for clubs, and are frequently used at a club station established for use of the club's members. Other special call-signs similar to club stations are sometimes temporarily assigned for "event stations" on special occasions, such as public events or radio-amateur expeditions to transmit from distant locations (DX-peditions). Like a club station, all the operators present for the event use the event call sign rather than their own.

== Gallery ==
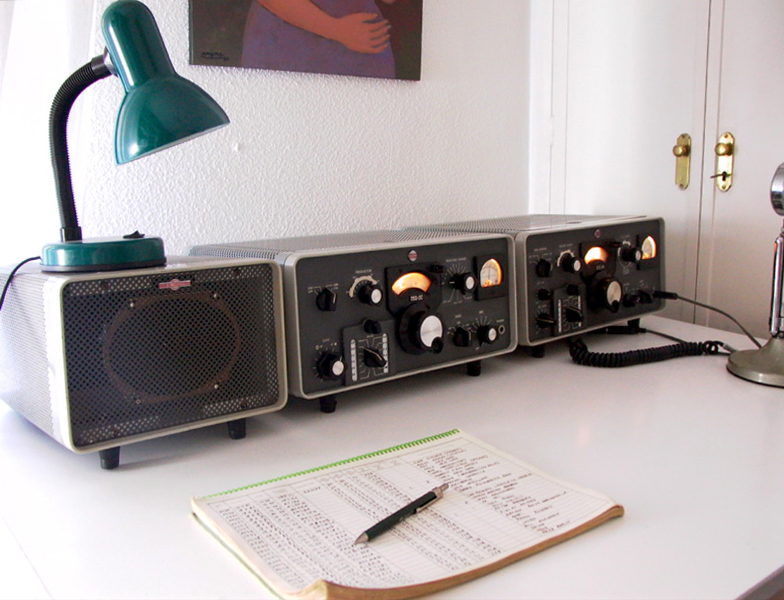
Amateur station with separate transmitter, receiver and power supply

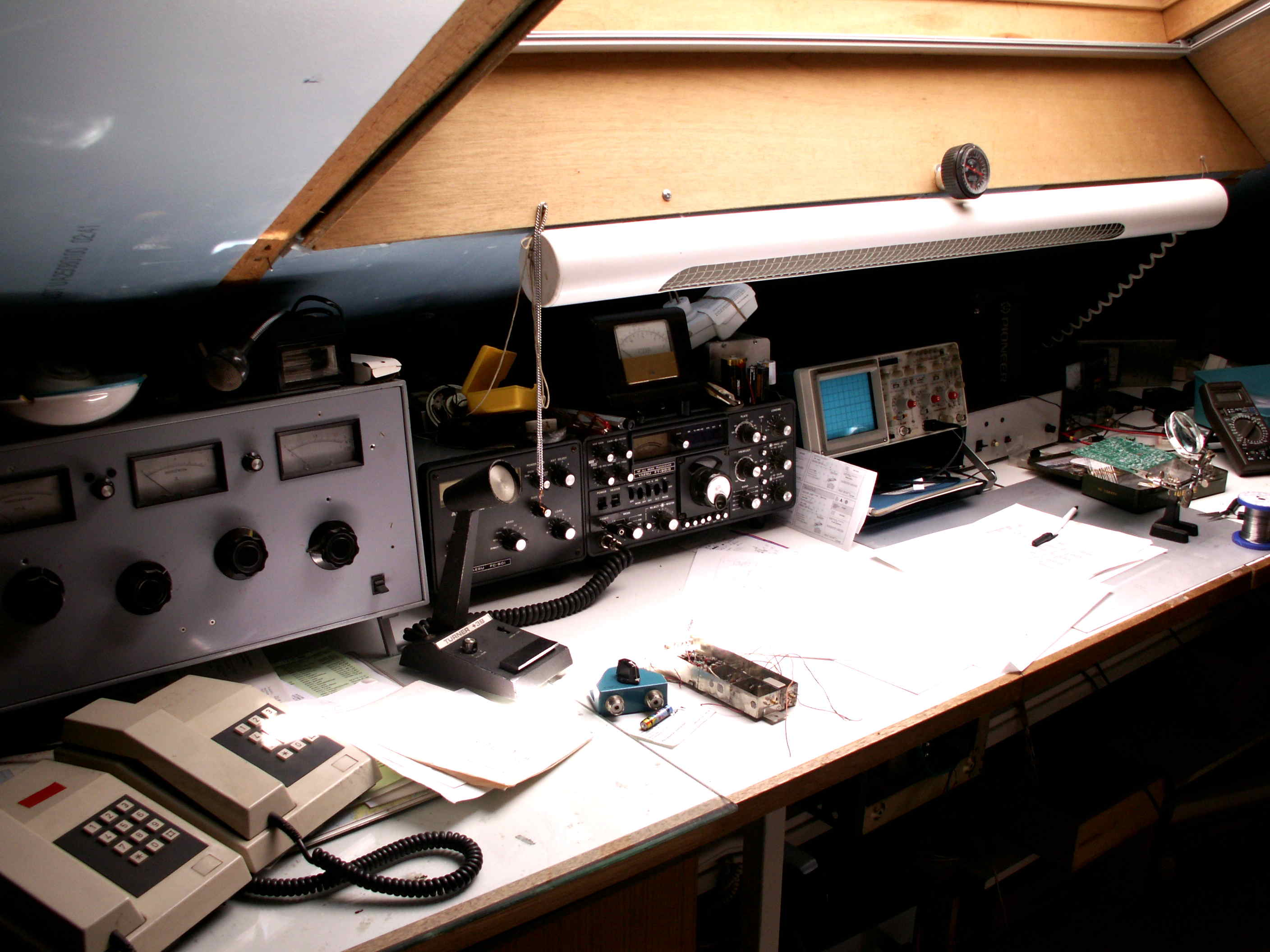
Amateur station featuring some older transceivers

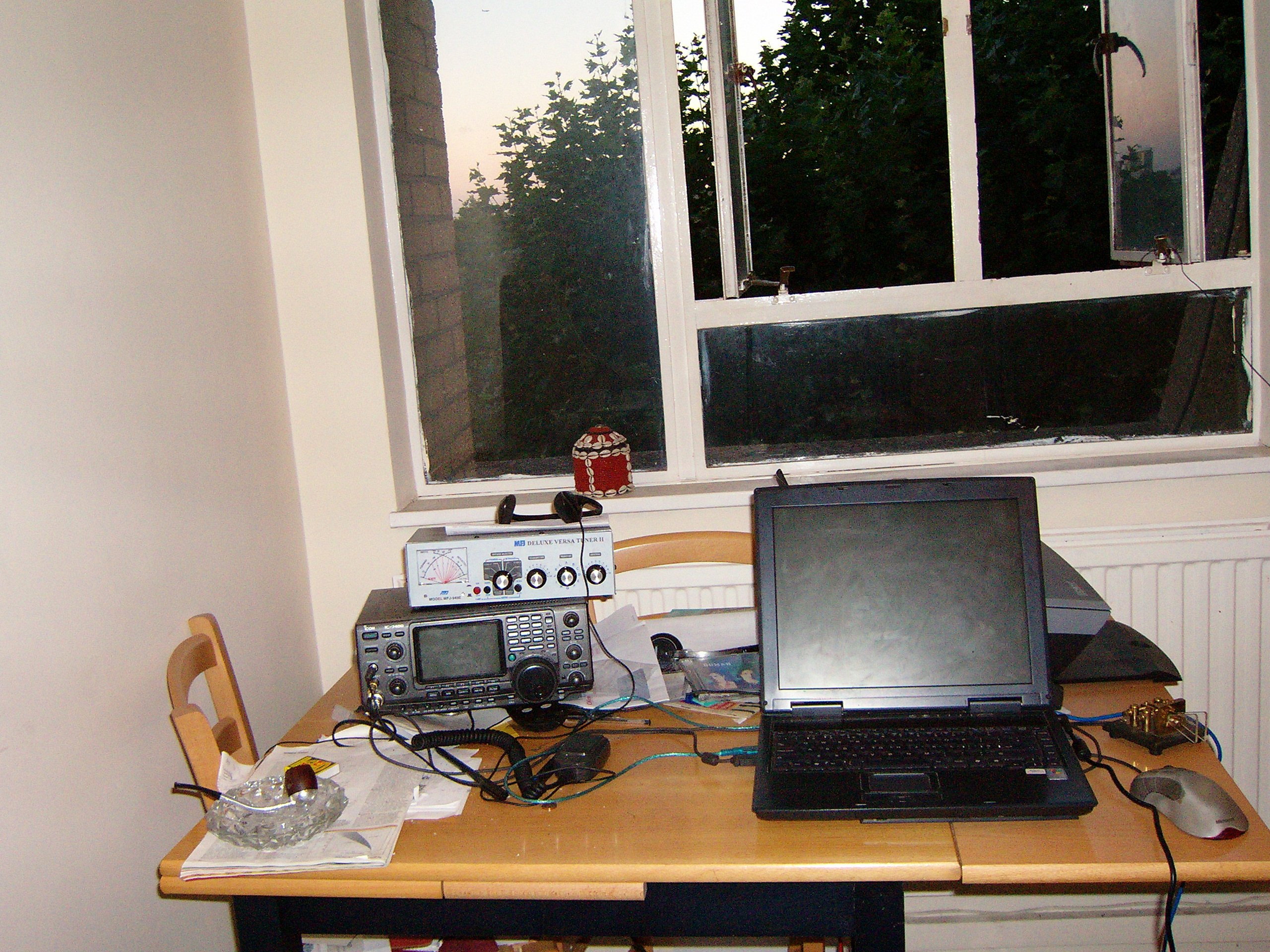
A compact amateur station in Central London, England

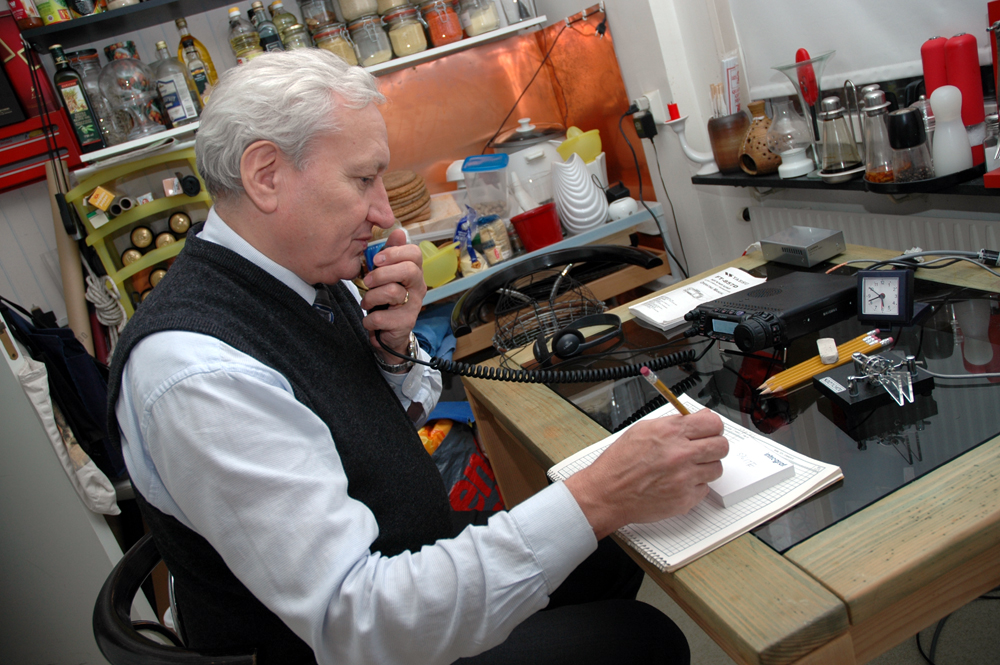
A temporary amateur station set up on a kitchen table

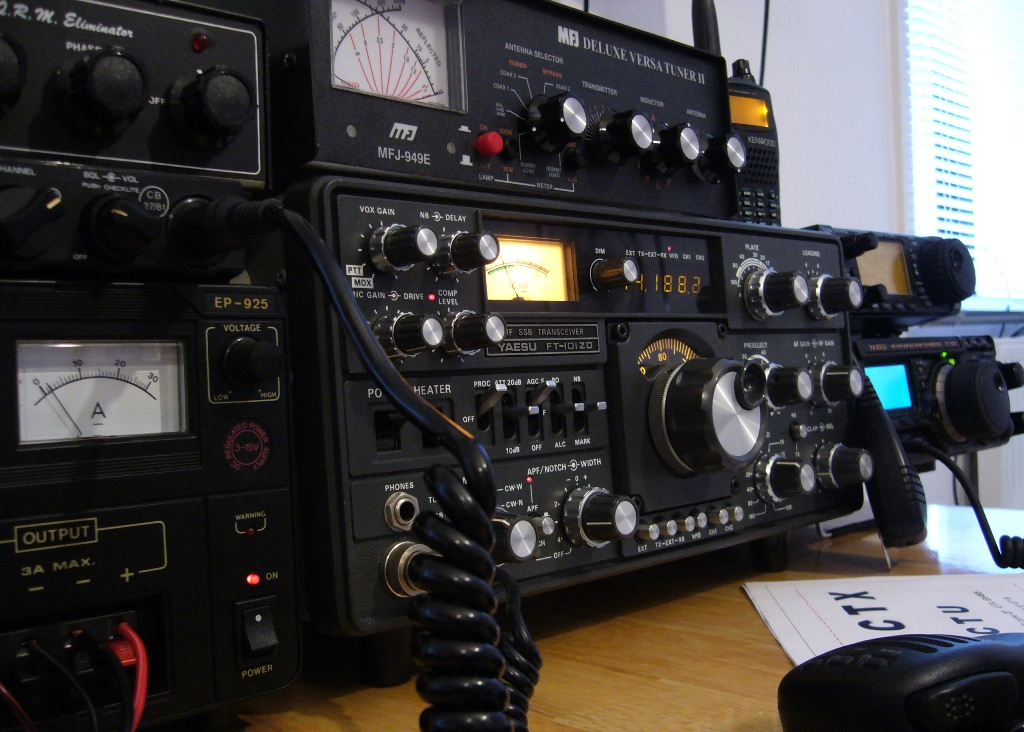
Amateur station M0TCX featuring modern and old transceivers

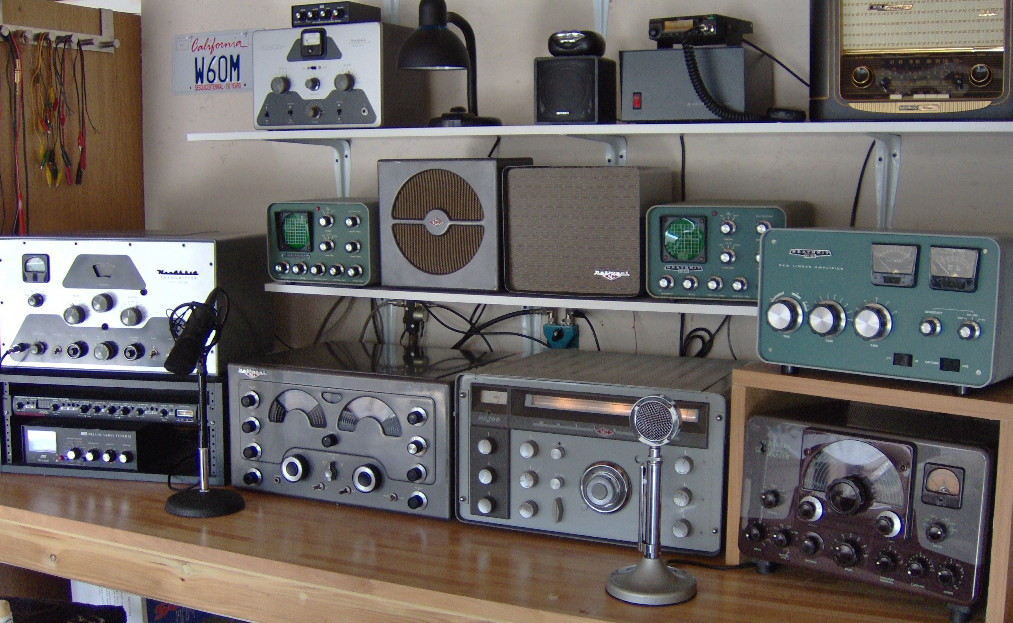
Amateur station W6OM featuring all vintage radio equipment

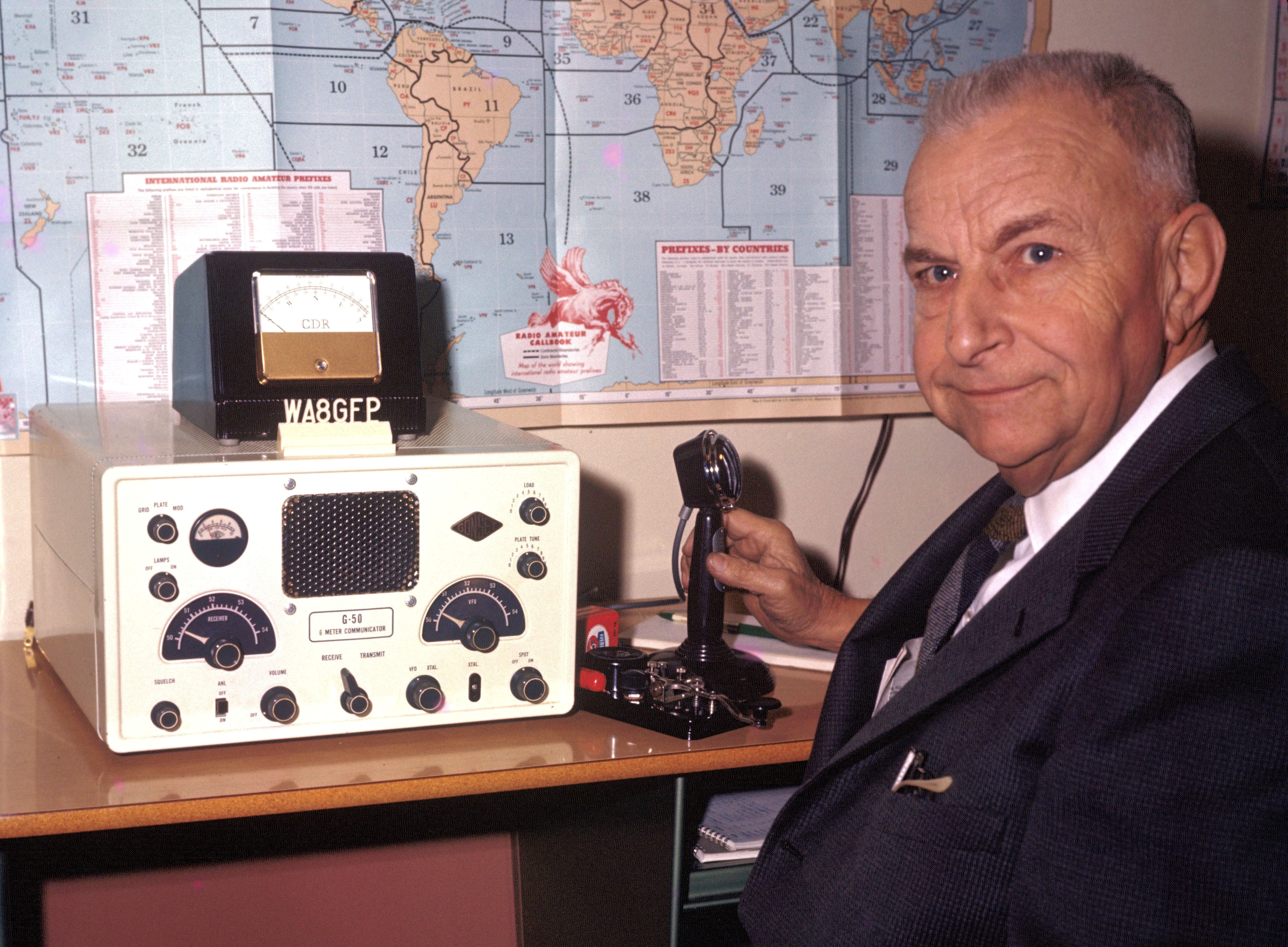
VHF amateur station (WA8GFP) for communication on the 6-meter band

== General references ==
Australia

- Wireless Institute of Australia (2005). The Foundation License Manual: Your Entry into Amateur Radio. Wireless Institute of Australia, November, 2005. ISBN 0-9758342-0-7

Canada

- Cleveland-Iliffe, John, and Smith, Geoffrey Read (1995). The Canadian Amateur Study Guide for the Basic Qualification. Fifth Edition, Second Printing. Ottawa, Ontario, Canada: Radio Amateurs of Canada. ISBN 1-895400-08-2

India

- Amateur radio licensing in India. Retrieved Aug. 13, 2007.

United Kingdom

- Betts, Allen (2001). Foundation Licence - Now!. London, United Kingdom: Radio Society of Great Britain, December, 2001. ISBN 1-872309-80-1

United States

- Straw, R. Dean, Reed, Dana G., Carman, R. Jan, and Wolfgang, Larry D. (ed.) (2003). Now You're Talking!. Fifth Edition. Newington, Connecticut, U.S.: American Radio Relay League, May, 2003. ISBN 0-87259-881-0
- American Radio Relay League (2003). The ARRL FCC Rule Book: Complete Guide to the FCC Regulations. 13th Edition. Newington, Connecticut, U.S.: American Radio Relay League, August, 2003. ISBN 0-87259-900-0
- Silver, H. Ward (2004). Ham Radio For Dummies. John Wiley and Sons, Ltd., April, 2004. ISBN 0-7645-5987-7
