= List of amateur radio organizations =

This is a list of amateur radio organizations. It includes notable amateur radio international, national, regional, and local organizations. It also includes lists of organisations from dependent and overseas territories and other territories.

== International ==
- Amateur Radio Digital Communications - amateur radio and Internet protocol coordination and funding
- Amateur Radio Lighthouse Society - devoted to maritime communications, amateur radio, lighthouses, and lightships
- European Radio Amateurs' Organization (EURAO)
- International Amateur Radio Club
- International Amateur Radio Union (IARU) - League of National Societies of Amateur Radio.
- International League of Esperantist Radio Amateurs
- Quarter Century Wireless Association - an organization of amateur radio operators first licensed 25 or more years ago
- Radio Amateur Satellite Corporation (AMSAT) - Organization dedicated exclusively to amateur radio communications via artificial orbiting satellites
- Royal Naval Amateur Radio Society - a specialised group or club for amateur radio operators who have a link with maritime employment
- Tucson Amateur Packet Radio (TAPR) - Dedicated to packet radio, digital communications and digital technology in amateur radio including software-defined radio
- Young Ladies Radio League

== National organisations ==
Country	Organization(s)	Comments
Algeria	Amateurs Radio Algeriens	a national non-profit organization for amateur radio enthusiasts in Algeria
Andorra	Unió de Radioaficionats Andorrans	a national non-profit organization for amateur radio enthusiasts in Andorra
Argentina	Radio Club Argentino	a national non-profit organization for amateur radio enthusiasts in Argentina
Aruba	Aruba Amateur Radio Club	a national non-profit organization for amateur radio enthusiasts in Aruba
Australia	Wireless Institute of Australia	a national non-profit organization for amateur radio enthusiasts in Australia
Austria	Österreichischer Versuchssenderverband	a national non-profit organization for amateur radio enthusiasts in Austria
Bangladesh	Bangladesh Amateur Radio League	National Association of Bangladeshi Radio Amateur. Member society of IARU
Bangladesh	Bangladesh NGOs Network for Radio and Communication	
Belarus	Belarusian Federation of Radioamateurs and Radiosportsmen	a national non-profit organization for amateur radio enthusiasts in Belarus
Belgium	Royal Union of Belgian Radio Amateurs (UBA)	a national non-profit organization for amateur radio enthusiasts in Belgium
Brazil	Liga de Amadores Brasileiros de Rádio Emissão (LABRE)	national non-profit organization of amateur radio in Brazil. Founded in 1934. Member society of IARU.
Bulgaria	Bulgarian Federation of Radio Amateurs	
Canada	Radio Amateurs of Canada (RAC)	
Canada	Manitoba Amateur Radio Museum	a national non-profit organization of amateur radio enthusiasts in Canada
Chile	Radio Club de Chile	Santiago, Chile
China	Chinese Radio Sports Association (CRSA)	a national non-profit organization for amateur radio enthusiasts in the People's Republic of China, national member society in the IARU, have affiliations such as Shanghai Radio Sports Association
China	Hong Kong Amateur Radio Transmitting Society (HARTS)	National Society of Radio Amateurs in Hong Kong (VR2HK), Member society of IARU, Non-profit organization.
China	Associação dos Radioamadores de Macau	
Colombia	Liga Colombiana de Radioaficionados	
Costa Rica	Radio Club de Costa Rica	
Croatia	Hrvatski Radioamaterski Savez	
Cuba	Federacion de Radioaficionados de Cuba	
Denmark	Experimenterende Danske Radioamatører	
El Salvador	Club de Radio Aficionados de El Salvador	
Estonia	Eesti Raadioamatööride Ühing	
Finland	Suomen Radioamatööriliitto	Finnish Amateur Radio League
France	Réseau des Émetteurs Français	
Germany	Deutscher Amateur Radio Club e.V. (DARC)	Largest national association for the German Radio Amateur. Member society of IARU
Germany	Verband der Funkamateure in Telekommunikation und Post e.V. (VFDB)	Second largest national association for the German Radio Amateur.
Greece	Radio Amateur Association of Greece	
Guatemala	Club de Radioaficionados de Guatemala	
Honduras	Radio Club de Honduras	
Iceland	Íslenskir Radíóamatörar	
India	Amateur Radio Society of India	National Association for the Indian Radio Amateur. Member society of IARU
India	National Institute of Amateur Radio	Government funded organization based in Hyderabad, India which is set up to promote Amateur Radio in India.
Indonesia	Organisasi Amatir Radio Indonesia	
Iraq	Iraqi Amateur Radio Society	
Ireland	Irish Radio Transmitters Society	
Israel	Israel Association of Radio Communication	
Italy	Associazione Radioamatori Italiani	Italian Amateur Radio Society - IARU member for Italy
Japan	Japan Amateur Radio League	National Amateur Radio Society of Japan (JARL), Member society of IARU
Korea	Korean Amateur Radio League	Member society of IARU
Kosovo	Association of Radio Amateurs of Kosovo	Member society of IARU Region 1
Kuwait	Kuwait Amateur Radio Society	
Latvia	Latvijas Radio Amatieru Līga	
Lesotho	Lesotho Amateur Radio Society	
Lithuania	Lietuvos Radijo Mėgėjų Draugija	Lithuanian Amateur Radio Society
Luxembourg	Radioamateurs du Luxembourg (RLX)	Member society of IARU
Luxembourg	Luxembourg Amateur Radio Union (LARU)	an independent national organization
Malaysia	Malaysian Amateur Radio Transmitters' Society (MARTS)	National organization and representation for amateur radio since 1952.
Malta	Malta Amateur Radio League	
Mauritius	Mauritius Amateur Radio Society	
Mexico	Federacion Mexicana de Radio Experimentadores	
Moldova	Asociația Radioamatorilor din Moldova	
Mongolia	Mongolian Radio Sport Federation	
Montenegro	Montenegrin Amateur Radio Pool	Montenegrin Amateur Radio Pool representing radio amateurs in Montenegro. Member society of IARU
Morocco	Association Royale des Radio Amateurs du Maroc	
New Zealand	New Zealand Association of Radio Transmitters	National Amateur Radio Association representing amateur radio in New Zealand. Member society of IARU
Nicaragua	Club de Radioexperimentadores de Nicaragua	
North Macedonia	Radioamaterski Sojuz na Makedonija	
Norway	Norsk Radio Relæ Liga	
Pakistan	Pakistan Amateur Radio Society	
Panama	Liga Panameña de Radioaficionados	
Panama	Radio Club de Panamá	
Panama	Asociacion de Radioaficionados del Canal de Panama (PCARA)	a non-profit organization of amateur radio enthusiasts in the Panama Canal
Panama	Liga Panameña de Radioaficionados Zona Octava (H.P.8.L.R.)	
Panama	Asociación Liga Panameña de Radioaficionado Barú (HP3-L.R. Barú)	
Panama	Liga Panameña de Radioaficionados Zona HP3LR	
Panama	Union Panameña de Radio Aficionados (U.P.R.A.)	
Panama	Grupo de Radioaficionados y Emergencias de Panamá (GREMPA)	
Panama	Colón DX Group (CDXG)	
Panama	Grupo Digital C4FM Panamá	a national non-profit organization of amateur radio enthusiasts in Panama
Paraguay	Radio Club Paraguayo	
Peru	Radio Club Peruano	
Philippines	Philippine Amateur Radio Association	
Poland	Polski Związek Krótkofalowców	
Portugal	Rede dos Emissores Portugueses	National Amateur Radio Association representing amateur radio in Portugal. Member society of IARU
Qatar	Qatar Amateur Radio Society	
Romania	Federatia Romana de Radioamatorism	Romanian Amateur Radio Federation
Russia	Russian Amateur Radio Union	
Serbia	Savez Radio-Amatera Srbije	
Singapore	Singapore Amateur Radio Transmitting Society (SARTS)	
Slovakia	Slovenský Zväz Rádioamatérov	
Slovenia	Zveza radioamaterjev Slovenije	
South Africa	South African Radio League	
Spain	Unión de Radioaficionados Españoles	Spanish Amateur Radio Union - IARU member for Spain
Sweden	Föreningen Sveriges Sändareamatörer	Swedish Radio Amateur Society - IARU member for Sweden
Switzerland	Union of Swiss Short Wave Amateurs	
Syria	Syrian Scientific Technical Amateur Radio Society	
Taiwan	Chinese Taipei Amateur Radio League	
Thailand	Radio Amateur Society of Thailand	
Trinidad and Tobago	Trinidad and Tobago Amateur Radio Society	National IARU affiliated amateur radio society.
Turkey	Türkiye Radyo Amatörleri Cemiyeti	The primary Turkish national amateur radio society with IARU & CEPT affiliation.
Ukraine	Ukrainian Amateur Radio League	
United Kingdom	Radio Society of Great Britain (RSGB)	
United Kingdom	Radio Amateur Emergency Network (RAYNET)	a national organization devoted to emergency communications.
United Kingdom	British Amateur Television Club	specializing in Fast Scan (LIVE) Amateur Television
United Kingdom	First Class CW Operators' Club	a club for amateur radio operators who regularly make use of Morse code
United States	Amateur Radio Emergency Service	a program of the ARRL
United States	American Radio Relay League (ARRL)	The National Association for Amateur Radio of United States of America
United States	National Amateur Radio Alliance (NARA)	Another US-based National Association
United States	Military Auxiliary Radio System	a United States Department of Defense sponsored program
Uruguay	Radio Club Uruguayo	
Venezuela	Radio Club Venezolano	

== Regional and local clubs ==
=== In Canada ===
- Halifax Amateur Radio Club, founded in Halifax, Nova Scotia, in 1933, is one of Canada's oldest amateur radio clubs.

=== In India ===
- JNA Wireless Association, one of the oldest amateur radio clubs in Mumbai
- Mumbai Amateur Radio Society, a group of ham radio enthusiasts in Mumbai

=== In Luxembourg ===
- Association des Radioamateurs du Kayldall (ADRAD), a local organization based in Rumelange

=== In Portugal ===
- Associacao de Radioamadores da Linha de Cascais, Cascais Local Radio Amateurs Association

=== In the United States ===
- Frankford Radio Club, founded in Philadelphia in 1927
- South Jersey Radio Association
- Texas DX Society

== Organisations of dependent and overseas territories ==
Dependent territory	Organization(s)
Aruba	Aruba Amateur Radio Club
Hong Kong	Hong Kong Amateur Radio Transmitting Society
Macao	Macau Amateur Radio Society

== Other organisations ==
List of amateur radio organisations based in other territories / entities or unrecognized countries

Country / Territory / Entity	Organization(s)	Comments
Kosovo	Shoqata e Radioamatorëve të Kosovës (SHRAK)	SHRAK is a non-profit organization for the amateur radio service in the Republic of Kosovo
Sovereign Military Order of Malta	The Order of Malta’s Italian Relief Corps (CISOM) Amateur Radio Station	Amateur radio station operating from Sovereign Military Order of Malta under callsign 1A0C
