= AARC =

AARC may refer to:

- Ad Astra Rocket Company
- Ak-Sar-Ben Amateur Radio Club
- Alberta Adolescent Recovery Centre
- Alps-Adriatic Rectors' Conference
- American Association for Respiratory Care
- Aruba Amateur Radio Club
- AustralAsia Rail Corporation
