= LARU =

LARU and similar can mean:

- Lambertsen Amphibious Respiratory Unit, an early USA frogman's rebreather
- Laru language spoken in Africa
- Laru, Iran, a village in Kohgiluyeh and Boyer-Ahmad Province, Iran
- The USA railroad reporting code for Lanan, Inc.
- Luxembourg Amateur Radio Union, a national amateur radio organization from Luxembourg

== Distinguish from ==
- Larue
- LaRue (disambiguation)
- La Rue (disambiguation)
- Larus, a genus of seagulls.
