= Nordic Radio Amateur Union =

- Abbreviation: NRAU
- Formation: 1935
- Type: Non-profit organization
- Purpose: Advocacy, Education
- Region served: Nordic countries
- Official language: Finnish, Norwegian, Swedish, Danish, Icelandic, Faroese
- Affiliations: International Amateur Radio Union, Finnish Amateur Radio League, Norwegian Radio Relay League, Swedish Society of Radio Amateurs, Icelandic Radio Amateurs, Faroese Amateur Radio Association, Danish Amateur Radio Experimenters
- Website: http://www.nrau.net/

Nordic Radio Amateur Union is a Regional Radio Amateur Alliance. It was founded in 1935 by the Radio Amateur Societies of the Nordic countries.

Its works towards common solutions for Nordic amateurs. Members, being delegates from member societies, meet ahead of each IARU meeting to prepare joint positions.

It organises the NRAU Activity Contest (NAC), from 28 MHz (10 m) and up; and the Scandinavian Activity Contest (SAC) on the five original HF bands. There are SSB and CW (Morse) divisions.

== See also ==
- International Amateur Radio Union
- Finnish Amateur Radio League
- Norwegian Radio Relay League
- Swedish Society of Radio Amateurs
- Icelandic Radio Amateurs
- Faroese Amateur Radio Association
- Danish Amateur Radio Experimenters
