= LX National QSL Bureau =

- Location: Luxembourg
- Region served: Luxembourg

The LX National QSL Bureau provides a service by volunteers to exchange amateur radio QSL cards between Luxembourgish amateur radio operators and amateur radio operators from the world. The LX National QSL Bureau was founded in July 2014 by the Association des Radioamateurs du Kayldall (ADRAD) and by the Luxembourg Amateur Radio Union (LARU).

The LX National QSL Bureau was closed in July 2015 on an initiative of the ADRAD Kayldall.
