= Alpe-Adria =

European bioregion

Alpe-Adria is a bioregion in Central Europe, embracing all of Slovenia, the Austrian states of Carinthia and Styria, and the Italian regions of Friuli-Venezia Giulia and Veneto. As of 2004, it is the subject of a proposal to create the world's first organic bioregion.

Italy and Austria were the pioneers in organic farming and are today leading the field, with Austria having over 23% and Italy 15% organic agriculture as of 2017. Slovenia has been gradually catching up since its independence in 1991. Its organic sector grew from being less than 0.1% of Slovenian agriculture in 1998, to reaching 10% as of 2017, surpassing the European Union average of 7%.

== See also ==
- The Alps-Adriatic Working Group
- Alpe Adria Cup, a men's basketball competition involving teams from Austria, Croatia, the Czech Republic, Poland, Slovakia, and Slovenia
