= International Beacon Project =

Network of radio propagation beacons

The International Beacon Project (IBP) is a worldwide network of radio propagation beacons. It consists of 18 continuous wave (CW) beacons operating on five designated frequencies in the high frequency band. The IBP beacons provide a means of assessing the prevailing ionospheric signal propagation characteristics to both amateur and commercial high frequency radio users.

The project is coordinated by the Northern California DX Foundation (NCDXF) and the International Amateur Radio Union (IARU). The first beacon of the IBP started operations from Northern California in 1979. The network was expanded to include 8 and subsequently 18 international transmission sites.

== History ==
The first beacon was put into operation in 1979 using the call sign WB6ZNL. It transmitted a 1 minute-long beacon every 10 minutes on 14.1 MHz using custom built transmitter and controller hardware. The signal consisted of the beacon's call sign transmitted in Morse code at 100 watts, four 9 second long dashes, each at 100 watts, 10 watts, 1 watt, and 0.1 watt, followed by sign-out at 100 watts.

Northern California DX Foundation and seven partnering organizations from the United States, Finland, Portugal, Israel, Japan, and Argentina operated the first iteration of the beacon network. Due to difficulties encountered in building beacon hardware, each site used a Kenwood TS-120 transceiver keyed and controlled by a custom built beacon controller. The network operated on 14.1 MHz and the beacon format remained unchanged.

In 1995, work began to improve the existing beacon network, so it could operate on 5 designated frequencies on the high frequency band. The new beacon network used Kenwood TS-50 transceivers keyed and controlled by an upgraded beacon controller unit. The number of partner organizations were expanded to 18 and the new 10 second beacon format was adopted.

== Notable Projects ==
Beyond helping amateur radio operators better understand HF radio propagation the project has aided scientists in better understanding the Earth's ionosphere, improved prediction models, and aided in radio direction finding.

== Frequencies and transmission schedule ==
The beacons transmit around the clock on the frequencies

14.100 MHz
18.110 MHz
21.150 MHz
24.930 MHz
28.200 MHz

Each beacon transmits its signal once on each frequency, in sequence from low (14.100 MHz) to high (28.200 MHz), followed by a 170 second pause during which beacons at other sites transmit in turn on the same frequencies, after which the cycle repeats. Each transmission is 10 second-long, and consists of the call sign of the beacon transmitted at 22 words per minute (WPM) followed by four dashes. The call sign and the first dash is transmitted at 100 watts of power. Subsequent three dashes are transmitted at 10 watts, 1 watt, and 0.1 watt respectively.

All beacon transmissions are coordinated using GPS time. As such, at a given frequency, all 18 beacons transmit in succession once every 3 minutes.

== Hardware ==
Beacons transmit using commercial HF transceivers (Kenwood TS-50 or Icom IC-7200) keyed and coordinated by a purpose-built, hardware beacon controller.

== Beacons ==
The International Beacon Project operates the following beacons as of January 2024.

Rot'n order	Beacon region	Call sign	Transmit site	Grid square	Operator
1	United Nations headquarters	4U1UN	New York City	FN 30 as	United Nations Staff Recreation Council; Amateur Radio Club (UNRC)
2	northern Canada	VE8AT	Inuvik, NT	CP 38 gh	RAC/NARC
3	California, United States	W6WX	Mt. Umunhum	CM 97 bd	Northern California DX Foundation (NCDXF)
4	Hawaii, United States	KH6RS	Maui	BL 10 ts	Maui Amateur Radio Club (Maui ARC)
5	New Zealand	ZL6B	Masterton	RE 78 tw	New Zealand Association of Radio Transmitters (NZART)
6	Western Australia	VK6RBP	Roleystone	OF 87 av	Wireless Institute of Australia (WIA)
7	Honshū, Japan	JA2IGY	Mt. Asama	PM 84 jk	Japan Amateur Radio League (JARL)
8	Siberia, Russia	RR9O	Novosibirsk	NO 14 kx	Russian Amateur Radio Union (SRR)
9	Hong Kong	VR2B	Hong Kong	OL 72 bg	Hong Kong Amateur Radio Transmitting Society (HARTS)
10	Sri Lanka	4S7B	Colombo	MJ 96 wv	Radio Society of Sri Lanka (RSSL)
11	South Africa	ZS6DN	Pretoria	KG 44 dc	South Africa Radio Society (SARL)
12	Kenya	5Z4B	Kariobangi	KI 88 ks	Amateur Radio Society of Kenya (ARSK)
13	Israel	4X6TU	Tel Aviv	KM 72 jb	Israel Association of Radio Communication (IARC)
14	Finland	OH2B	Lohja	KP 20 eh	Finnish Amateur Radio League (SRAL)
15	Madeira Island, Portugal	CS3B	Santo da Serra	IM 12 or	Rede dos Emissores Portugueses (REP)
16	Argentina	LU4AA	Buenos Aires	GF 05 tj	Radio Club Argentino (RCA)
17	Peru	OA4B	Lima	FH 17 mw	Radio Club Peruano (RCP)
18	northern Venezuela	YV5B	Caracas	FJ 69 cc	Radio Club Venezolano (RCV)
