= ERAU =

Erau or ERAU may refer to:

- Erau, an Indonesian cultural festival
- Embry–Riddle Aeronautical University, a university with campuses in Daytona Beach, Florida and Prescott, Arizona, United States
- Eesti Raadioamatööride Ühing, an amateur radio organization in Estonia
- Hérault (Occitan: Erau), a department in Occitania, southern France
  - Hérault (river) (Occitan: Erau), a river flowing through the department
