= Alternative High School =

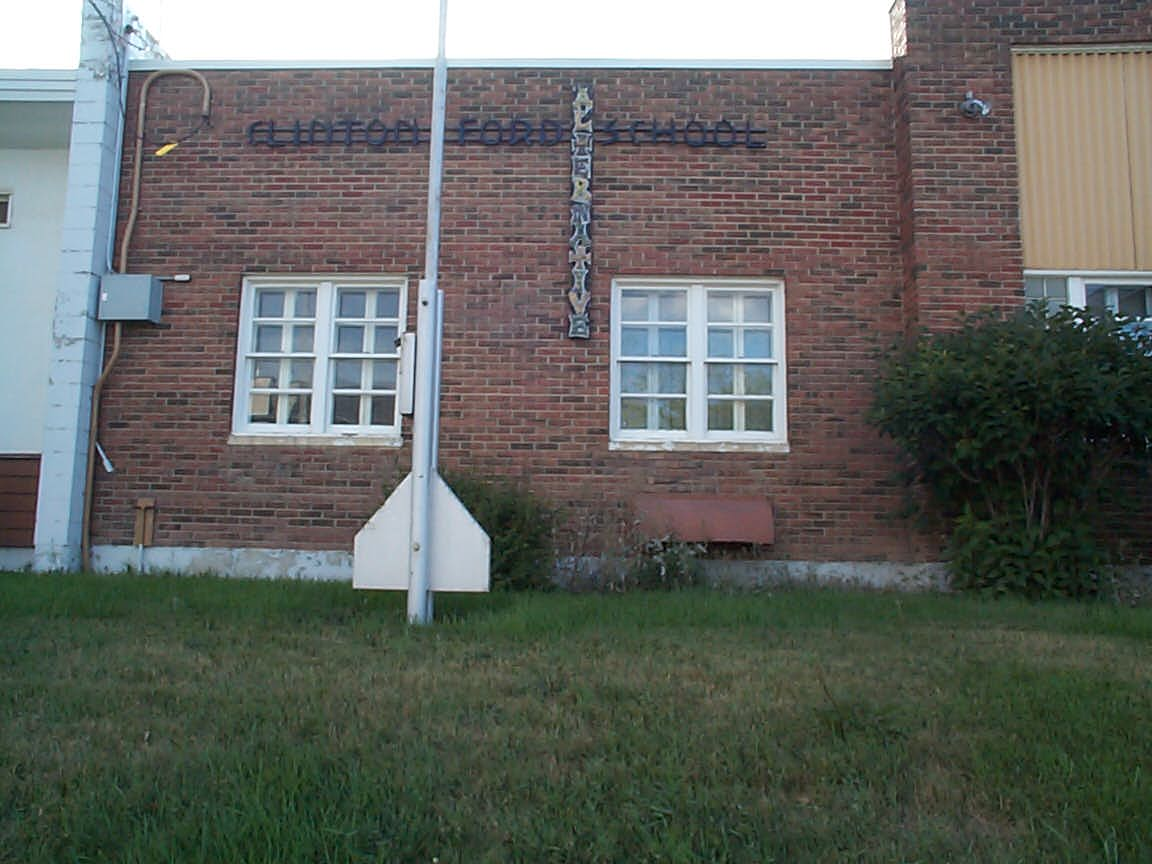

Location
- 5003 - 20 Street S.W. (Clinton Ford Centre); Calgary, Alberta; Canada; 51°00′33″N 114°06′35″W

Information
- School type: Public
- Founded: 1974 (1975, CBE acquired control)
- School board: Calgary Board of Education
- Principal: Tracy Dalton
- Grades: 10-12
- Enrollment: 130 (2023)
  - Grade 10: 50
  - Grade 11: 45
  - Grade 12: 35
- Area: Area IV, Ward 11
- Website: schools.cbe.ab.ca/b863/

Alternative High School (AHS) is a public senior high (secondary) school in Calgary, Alberta, Canada; which teaches grades 10 through 12. AHS is currently located at the Clinton Ford Centre, which was home to the former Clinton Ford Elementary School.

AHS was launched, independent of the board, in September 1974 by a parents group. It reflected many of the "alternative education" ideas that were popular at the time. The early philosophy the school borrowed from the ideas of A. S. Neill, who founded Summerhill School. This involved supporting the freedom of children, and opposing the traditional structure and control of most schools. Although, AHS was never meant to be a copy of Summerhill.

In 1975 AHS came under the control of the Calgary Board of Education (CBE).

== Special programs ==
The school helps operate an off-campus class at the Alberta Adolescent Recovery Centre. Two teachers from the school help students progressively get back into the regular school system if they are of school age after they reach Level Three of treatment.

== Notable alumna ==
- Feist, musician (1994)
