= CRK =

CRK can refer to:

== Aviation ==
- Bombardier CRJ 1000 (IATA: CRK), a regional jet built in Canada
- Clark International Airport (IATA: CRK), Pampanga, Philippines
- Hong Kong Airlines (ICAO: CRK), Hong Kong SAR

== Other ==
- Český Radioklub, an amateur radio organization in the Czech Republic
- Chris Reeve Knives, an American knife manufacturer
- Cookie Run: Kingdom, a South Korean 2021 RPG mobile game
- CRK (gene)
- Plains Cree language (ISO-639-3 code)
- Republican Circle, a Belgian republican association
- Chattahoochee Riverkeeper, formerly Upper Chattahoochee Riverkeeper, an environmental advocacy organization
- Radio Kansai, a radio station in Hyogo Prefecture, Japan

== See also ==
- Crk (disambiguation)
