= NRRL =

NRRL may refer to:

- ARS Culture Collection (NRRL), a culture collection of the Agricultural Research Service (ARS)
- Northern Regional Research Laboratory, now the National Center for Agricultural Utilization Research
- Norsk Radio Relæ Liga, a national non-profit organization for amateur radio enthusiasts in Norway
