= Trinidad and Tobago Amateur Radio Society =

- Abbreviation: TTARS
- Formation: May 1981
- Type: Non-profit organization
- Purpose: Advocacy, Education
- Headquarters: Boy Scouts Headquarters, Port of Spain; FK90fq
- Region served: Trinidad and Tobago
- President: Dexter Harroo, 9Y4C (2021-)
- Affiliations: International Amateur Radio Union
- Website: https://9y4.tt

The Trinidad and Tobago Amateur Radio Society, Inc. (TTARS) is the national amateur radio organization in the Republic of Trinidad and Tobago. It is a member society of the International Amateur Radio Union (IARU).

== History ==
The first amateur radio contact from Trinidad and Tobago was made in 1929 by an airline co-pilot by the name of Colin Fraser with another radio operator, S. R. Connelly, W3BCR from Pennsylvania, United States. Colin later adopted the callsign VP4CF. This contact was made using morse code on the 40 meter amateur band. A few other operators soon joined him, building radios from plans and kits. Since amateur radio in Trinidad was not regulated or licensed, most amateurs used arbitrary callsigns.

One of the early pioneers in Trinidad, Paul Alonzo, VP4TK, used amateur radio to broadcast cricket results on the 40 meter band. His equipment was later seized by the local police and he was charged with operating radio equipment without a license. Public outcry from citizens made it evident that licensing and regulation was needed.

After World War II, there were many changes made to amateur radio. Government regulation and licensing were put into effect. Since a formal procedure was now established, many people joined the hobby. In response to this, several local hams founded the first radio club in Trinidad in 1951 as a means of self-regulation and coordination of amateur radio activities. It was called the Amateur Radio Society of Trinidad and Tobago (ARSTT). It functioned until 1959 when it became dormant. Another local club, the South Trinidad Amateur Radio Society (STARS) was formed at that time.

In 1961, ARSTT was reactivated under the name of TTARS, the Trinidad and Tobago Amateur Radio Society, a name which it retains to this day. TTARS was eventually incorporated by Act of Parliament: Act 13/1981.

In 2001, The REACT International Convention was held in Trinidad and Tobago, with the support of TTARS.

== Membership ==
TTARS offers four membership levels: full, associate, honorary and affiliate. To be eligible for full membership, one requires an amateur radio license issued by the Trinidad and Tobago government. Dues from full members go mainly toward maintaining the repeaters and the club station, as well as the general operational costs of the society. Only full financial members get the ability to vote and run for office as elected TTARS officials.

== Services ==
TTARS publishes a call book listing radio amateurs in Trinidad and Tobago. Information in the directory includes call sign, name, addresses, and telephone numbers. It is usually distributed at the Annual General Meeting and is updated periodically. Members are also entitled to use the TTARS QSL Bureau for sending and receiving QSL cards.

== Regions ==
In an effort to encourage full participation of members in all parts of the country, TTARS has four regions which coincide with regions administered by Trinidad and Tobago local government and the respective regional corporations.

The Northern region consists of the North West part of the island of Trinidad, which comprises Diego Martin, San Juan–Laventille and the City of Port of Spain.

The Central region consists of the central and north east part of the island of Trinidad, which comprises the regions of Tunapuna–Piarco, Sangre Grande, Couva–Tabaquite–Talparo as well as the boroughs of Chaguanas and Arima.

The Southern region consists of the southern part of the island of Trinidad, which comprises the regions of Princes Town, Siparia, Rio Claro-Mayaro, Penal–Debe, as well as the Borough of Point Fortin and the city of San Fernando.

The Tobago Region consists of the entire Island of Tobago, which includes the city of Scarborough.

== Headquarters and club station ==
TTARS headquarters is currently located at Boy Scouts' Headquarters in Port of Spain, Trinidad. It houses a well equipped station covering all HF amateur radio bands on most modes and a packet radio digipeater. The club station is managed by a club custodian and open to guests to operate during some weekday evenings. A second TTARS sponsored station with the callsign 9Y4PCS in San Fernando operates out of Presentation College and was managed by Anthony Lee-Mack, 9Y4AL, who was a teacher at the school until his death. TTARS is now working with the school to continue the operations of 9Y4PCS in 9Y4AL's absence.

== Current activities ==
TTARS coordinates several activities related to Amateur Radio in Trinidad and Tobago on most popular amateur radio bands, including HF bands and the two meter band.

TTARS holds an annual emergency exercise or Field Day which may or may not coincide with the IARU region 2 field day. Local radio amateurs operate from a sponsored campsite, usually, a beach house in a remote region in the North East of Trinidad called Toco and talk to other hams worldwide.

TTARS operates three FM repeaters on the two meter VHF amateur band. Trinidad is covered by two repeaters. One of them is located on the Northern mountain range and its operating frequency is 147.93 MHz with a negative shift of 600 kHz and covers most of the island. However, coverage is best in the Northern part of the island. Sometimes, hams from other Caribbean Islands such as Grenada and St. Vincent are able to talk to hams in Trinidad via this repeater. This repeater is the most heavily used by local hams. The second repeater in Trinidad is located in the Central Range and operates on 146.94 MHz with a negative shift of 600 kHz. It covers most of the island but its coverage is best in Central and South Trinidad. There is a third repeater in Tobago on 147.76 MHz, also with a negative shift of 600kHz. This repeater covers Tobago and North East Trinidad.

TTARS runs two club nets. The first net is the Sunday night 2 meter net held on the 147.93 MHz repeater on Sunday nights at 7:59PM local time or 2359 UTC. If the main repeater is not available, 146.94 is used as an alternate. The second net is the Hummingbird net and is held on 7.159 MHz LSB in the 40 meter band on Sunday mornings at 9AM local time or 1300 UTC. These repeaters are available for use in emergencies as listed by the U.S. Navy.

The local Boy Scouts movement, in conjunction with TTARS participates in the worldwide annual Jamboree on the Air (JOTA) where scouts are given the opportunity to talk to Scouts in other parts of the world via amateur radio.

Classes are held for those wishing to take the examination in order to obtain an amateur radio license. The locations vary from time to time, but there is usually one in Presentation College, San Fernando run by Anthony Lee-Mack, 9Y4AL.

Occasionally, TTARS sponsors amateur radio contests. The most notable of these is the Worked All Trinidad and Tobago Simplex or WATTS contest. The objective of this contest is to make contact with as many amateur radio operators in Trinidad and Tobago without the aid of repeater stations or satellites. The club station 9Y4TT is also active for some contests including the IARU HF championships.

TTARS operates the QSL Bureau for Trinidad and Tobago.

== Emergency Preparedness ==
The Emergency Communications Service (EmComms) is an organization within TTARS that provides amateur radio communications during times of emergency and disaster, most notably hurricanes and floods. It is headed by an Emergency Coordinator who coordinates emergency and disaster preparedness plans and assigns amateur radio resources in the event of an activation by an affiliated agency. EmComms works closely with O.D.P.M as well as the local regional corporations that comprise local Government. There is some cooperation with the local CB clubs as well as the local chapter of REACT International, but this is mostly done through EmComms. TTARS membership is not a requirement to participate in emergency preparedness involving amateur radio in Trinidad and Tobago.

== See also ==
- Communications in Trinidad and Tobago
