= IBC =

IBC is an initialism that can stand for:

== Broadcasting ==
- Intercontinental Broadcasting Corporation, Channel 13, Philippines
- International Beacon Project, Worldwide network of radio propagation beacons
- International Broadcast Centre
- International Broadcasting Company, created by Leonard Plugge
  - IBC Studios, the studios for the above
- International Broadcasting Convention, an annual media, entertainment and technology show
- Inuit Broadcasting Corporation, Canada
- Iwate Broadcasting Company, Japan

== Business ==
- IBC Airways, an American airline company
- IBC (bus manufacturer), a former Australian bus manufacturer
- IBC Vehicles, Isuzu Bedford Company
- Índice Bursátil de Capitalización, a stock market index in Venezuela
- Institute of Business Consulting, UK
- Insolvency and Bankruptcy Code, 2016, India
- International Bank of Commerce, Texas, United States
- International Biographical Centre, a publisher
- International Bonded Couriers, an international logistics company
- International Boxing Club of New York
- International Building Code, used in most of the US
- International business company (or corporation)
- Interstate Bakeries Corporation
- Intertemporal budget constraint, a budgeting term

== Religion ==
- Indiana Bible College, US
- International Bahá'í Council
- International Buddhist College, Thailand
- International Old Catholic Bishops' Conference, or International Bishops' Conference
- Irish Baptist College, Republic of Ireland
- Isaac Breuer College of Hebraic Studies, Israel
- Irish Baptist College, Republic of Ireland
- International Buddhist Confederation, Republic of India

== Other uses ==
- IBC Root Beer
- Indirect Branch Control, information returned by the CPUID instruction for the Intel Pentium and successors
- Inflammatory breast cancer
- Information-based complexity
- Intermediate bulk container, industrial-grade containers engineered for the mass handling, transport, and storage of materials
- International Botanical Congress
- International Boundary Commission
- International Boxing Council
- International branch campus
- Iran Bioinformatics Center, Iran
- Iraq Body Count project
- Italy. Common Good (Italia. Bene Comune), Italian political coalition
