= Estonian Technical and Sport Union =

Organization based in Estonia

Estonian Technical and Sport Union (abbreviation ETSU; Estonian: Eesti Tehnika- ja Spordiliit) is an Estonian organization, which deals with technics-related sports.

ETSU is established on 25 June 1990.

ETSU is an umbrella organization for seven sub-organizations:

- Eesti Automudelispordi Klubi (member of EOC)
- Eesti Laevamodellistide Liit (member of EOC)
- Estonian Radio Amateurs' Union (Estonian: Eesti Raadioamatööride Ühing) (member of EOC)
- Noorte Spordi- ja Tehnikaklubi Master
- Ida-Virumaa Automudelispordi Klubi
- MTÜ Sindi Mudelisport
- MTÜ Mudelihall
