= Sjra =

Sjra or SJRA may refer to:

== People ==
- Sjra Schoffelen

== Organizations ==
- San Jacinto River Authority
- San Jose Redevelopment Agency
- South Jersey Radio Association
