= Heartland REACT =

- Successor: Heartland READY
- Formation: 1967
- Dissolved: December 31, 2021
- Type: Non-Profit
- Purpose: Radio Communications; Volunteer
- Location: Omaha, Nebraska
- Parent organization: REACT International
- Volunteers: 70+ (2021)
- Website: www.heartlandreact.com
- Formerly called: Douglas County REACT

Heartland REACT was a chapter of REACT International based in Omaha, Nebraska. It was founded in 1967 as Douglas County REACT and incorporated as a non-profit organization in 1972 to provide communications as a public service in the event of emergency and non-emergency events around the Omaha metro area. The Omaha chapter of REACT International was dissolved in 2021 and the organization was reformed as Heartland READY.

== Purpose ==
Heartland REACT provided communications in the event of severe weather. With over 70 trained storm spotters that rapidly deployed to relay weather and damage reports to the National Weather Service and the Douglas County and Sarpy County Emergency Management Agencies. Members were are located in three local news stations to provide meteorologists with visual reports.

In the winter, such as during a blizzard, members of the 4x4 Patrol scouted roads for citizens who had encountered trouble such as accidents and driving into the ditch, and transported them to a warm, safe place until help arrived. They also provided transportation for essential hospital personnel to their place of work if they are not able to get to work safely in their own vehicles.

In the event of special events as determined by local law enforcement, Heartland REACT was also called as first responders by the Omaha Police Department for missing children searches, missing endangered adults, amber alerts, and similar emergencies.

Heartland REACT provided free communications services for various events such a parades, bike rides, and walks/runs in order to ensure the safety of those participating in such events.

=== Events ===
Communications were provided for multiple events each year. Some of the events worked were:

- Engineers Without Boarders
- Omaha Duathlon
- 7 Lakes Marathon
- NE Science Festival
- Omaha Women's Triathlon
- Flanagan Lake Triathlon
- O.W.L. Ride
- Omaha Triathlon
- A.F.S.P. Suicide Prevention Walk
- Black Squirrel Triathlon
- Heartland Marathon
- Florence Days Parade
- Halloween Patrol
- N.A.M.I. Walk
- Omaha Metro Heart Walk
- Omaha Safety Fair

== Communications Methods ==
Heartland REACT used a combination of radio services to communicate. When first started, CB radios were used, but the team soon evolved into more reliable forms of communication.

=== Citizens Band Radio ===
In the early days of REACT, its primary purpose was to monitor Channel 9 on the Citizens' band radio for emergencies. Heartland REACT too used "Class D" CB radios. However, as the "CB craze" began to dwindle, this service was eventually discontinued.

=== GMRS ===
After a massive 1975 Tornado that hit Omaha, damage assessment was taken by REACT members around the city. However, "Class D" CB radio communications proved unreliable due to radio skip. After enough donations were received, the decision was made to abandon Class D CB Radios and the team moved to "Class A" CB Radios, which eventually became the General Mobile Radio Service. A repeater was purchased and installed, which operated at the frequency 462.700 MHz. Because this frequency is an "interstitial" frequency, the public was able to listen directly to the organizations communications using FRS radios. In 2010, Heartland REACT began streaming a feed of its GMRS repeater to the internet for the public listening via the Radio Reference website, and several mobile phone applications. Though the repeater was later upgraded and replaced in the late 1970s, the frequency was never changed and was in use until March 2011 when it was repurposed as an amateur radio repeater.

=== Amateur Radio ===
In 2009, a member vote was taken and it was decided to move the organization to the Amateur Radio service. Many members were already licensed Amateur Radio Operator's. Because GMRS radios are type accepted by the FCC, it was determined that a move to the 70cm (440 MHz) Amateur Band was most feasible as many of the team's existing radios could be programmed to run on these frequencies, incurring minimal overhead in equipment costs and downtime during the transition. In April 2010, a UHF HAM repeater was purchased for use. By September 1, 2010, all members of Heartland REACT were required to hold a Technician class amateur radio license or higher. The former GMRS repeater was repurposed and relocated to a different tower in Sarpy County until it eventually failed. In 2012, a used Motorola repeater was purchased, programmed and established in Elkhorn operating at 442.950 MHz. Both repeaters utilized a CTCSS tone of 146.2 Hz and are open to the public except when a REACT net was in operation. In 2020, Heartland REACT began moving to Digital Mobile Radio communications using Motorola DMR repeaters on the same amateur frequencies and in 2021, abandoned all analog communications.
