= Telecommunications in Trinidad and Tobago =

Telecommunications in Trinidad and Tobago include radio, television, fixed and mobile telephones, and the Internet.

== Radio and television ==
- ITU call sign prefix:
  - National: 9Y and 9Z
  - Amateur radio: 9Y4 and 9Z4
  - Broadcast: 9Y3
  - Commercial land mobile: 9Y7
- Radio stations:
  - 5 radio networks, one state-owned, broadcast over about 35 stations (2007);
  - 1 medium wave AM, 35 VHF FM, and no shortwave stations (2006).
- Radios: 680,000 (1997).
- Amateur radio operators: ~400.
- Television stations:
  - 5 TV networks, one of which is state-owned, broadcast on multiple stations (2007);
  - 3 TV stations (2006).
- Television sets: 425,000 (1997).

BBC World Service radio is available on 98.7 FM.

== Telephones ==
Country Code: +1
Area Code: 868
International Call Prefix: 011 (outside NANP)

Calls from Trinidad and Tobago to the US, Canada, and other NANP Caribbean nations, are dialed as 1 + NANP area code + 7-digit number. Calls from Trinidad and Tobago to non-NANP countries are dialed as 011 + country code + phone number with local area code.

Number Format: nxx-xxxx

- Main lines:
  - 287,000 lines in use, 119th in the world (2012);
  - 209,000 lines in use (1995).
- Mobile cellular:
  - 1.9 million lines, 147th in the world (2012);
  - 1.5 million lines (2007).
- Telephone system: excellent international service, tropospheric scatter to Barbados and Guyana; good local service; combined fixed-line and mobile-cellular teledensity roughly 170 telephones per 100 persons (2011).
- Communications cables: five systems, AMERICAS-II, Eastern Caribbean Fibre System (ECFS), Global Caribbean Network (GCN), Suriname-Guyana Submarine Cable System (SG-SCS), and Trinidad-Curaçao, provide connectivity to the U.S., parts of the Caribbean and South America (2011).
- Satellite earth stations: One Intelsat (Atlantic Ocean) (2011).
- Landline Provider: Telecommunications Services of Trinidad and Tobago (TSTT)., Digicel Play, Cable & Wireless Communications (branded as FLOW), Amplia and RVR Technologies Ltd.
- Mobile Providers: Digicel and bmobile (TSTT). Cable & Wireless Communications has been shortlisted by TATT to receive an LTE License.

== Internet ==
- Top level domain: .tt
- Internet users:
  - 846,000 users, 137th in the world; 69.2% of the population (July 2016 est.).
  - 729,897 users, 123rd in the world; 59.5% of the population, 66th in the world (2012).
  - 593,000 users, 115th in the world (2009).
- Fixed broadband: 166,948 subscriptions, 86th in the world; 13.6% of population, 65th in the world (2012).
- Wireless broadband: 18,028 subscriptions, 132nd in the world; 1.5% of the population, 131st in the world (2012).
- Internet hosts: 241,690 users, 69th in the world (2012).
- IPv4: 470,016 addresses allocated, less than 0.05% of the world total, 383.3 addresses per 1000 people (2012).
- Internet service providers (ISPs): 10 (2018).

Facebook is the most popular social media platform.

=== Internet censorship and surveillance ===
There are no government restrictions on access to the Internet or credible reports that the government monitors e-mail or Internet chat rooms without judicial oversight.

The constitution and the law provide for freedom of speech and press, and the government generally respects these rights in practice. An independent press, an effective judiciary, and a functioning democratic political system combine to ensure freedom of speech and press. The law prohibits acts that would offend or insult another person or group on the basis of race, origin, or religion or that would incite racial or religious hatred. The constitution and the law prohibit arbitrary interference with privacy, family, home, or correspondence, and the government generally respects these prohibitions in practice.

== See also ==
- Telecommunications Authority of Trinidad and Tobago
- Trinidad and Tobago Amateur Radio Society
- List of newspapers in Trinidad and Tobago
- Trinidad and Tobago
