= Emirates Amateur Radio Society =

جمعية الإمارات لهواة اللاسلكي Emirates Amateur Radio Society
- Abbreviation: EARS
- Type: Non-profit organization
- Purpose: Advocacy, Education
- Location(s): Sharjah, United Arab Emirates; LL75sg
- Region served: United Arab Emirates
- Official language: Arabic
- President: His Highness Abdulla Faisal Al Qassimi, A61AQ
- Main organ: Col M.H.Abdullah A61Q.
- Affiliations: International Amateur Radio Union
- Website: http://ears.ae

The Emirates Amateur Radio Society (in Arabic, جمعية الإمارات لهواة اللاسلكي) is a national non-profit organization for amateur radio enthusiasts in the United Arab Emirates. EARS is formally recognized as a national organization by the Ministry of Social Affairs in the United Arab Emirates. The EARS represents the interests of UAE amateur radio operators before UAE and international telecommunications regulatory authorities. EARS is the national member society representing the United Arab Emirates in the International Amateur Radio Union, approved on February 10, 2009.

== See also ==
- Amateur Radio Association of Bahrain
- Kuwait Amateur Radio Society
- Qatar Amateur Radio Society
