= List of reporting marks: L =

Note: Marks ending in U are for container owners; marks ending in X are not common carriers; marks ending in Z are for trailers without flanged wheels. All other marks are of common-carrier railroads.

== L ==
- LA - Louisiana and Arkansas Railway, Kansas City Southern Railway
- LACX - Goodyear Tire and Rubber Company
- LAFX - LafargeHolcim
- LAHX - Calrail Company, Transportation Equipment, Inc.
- LAJ - Los Angeles Junction Railway
- LAKX - City of Lakeland
- LAL - Livonia, Avon and Lakeville Railroad
- LAMX - Lamco, Inc.
- LANO - Penn Eastern Rail Lines, Inc.
- LANU - CATU Containers, SA
- LAPT - Los Angeles Union Passenger Terminal
- LAPX - General American Transportation Corporation
- LARU - Lanan, Inc.
- LASB - Lackawaxen and Stourbridge Railroad
- LBFX - L.B. Foster Company
- LBR - Lowville and Beaver River Railroad
- LBWX - Pulaski Development Company, Technical Propellants, Inc.
- LC - Lancaster and Chester Railway
- LCCE - Lee County Central Electric
- LCCX - Liquid Carbonic Corporation
- LCEX - Lone Star Industries, Inc.
- LCGX - Continental Grain Company, Cargill, Inc.
- LCHX - LCP Transportation, Inc.
- LCIX - Liquid Carbonic Corporation, Praxair, Inc.
- LCLX - Ledcor Communications, Ltd.
- LCOX - L A Colo and Sons, Inc.
- LCPX - LCP Transportation, Inc., General American Marks Company
- LCR - Lake County Railroad
- LCRC - Lenawee County Railroad
- LCRR - Lincoln Central Railroad; Lorraine, Eastern and Pacific Railroad; Lincoln Pacific Railway
- LCRX - Lower Colorado River Authority
- LCSX - Laclede Steel Company
- LCWX - LCP Chemicals-West Virginia, Inc.
- LDAX - Louisiana Agricultural Finance Authority
- LDCX - Louis Dreyfus Corporation
- LDRR - Louisiana and Delta Railroad
- LDRT - Lake Front Dock and Railroad Terminal Company
- LDSX - Lambton Diesel Specialists, Inc.
- LDTC - Lawndale Transportation Company
- LE - Louisiana Eastern Railroad
- LECX - Leco Corporation
- LEE - Lake Erie and Eastern Railroad
- LEF - Lake Erie, Franklin and Clarion Railroad
- LEFX - Greenville Leasing Company
- LEHX - Lehigh Cement Company
- LEN - Lake Erie and Northern Railway
- LEOX - Golden Foods, Inc.
- LEP - Lorraine, Eastern and Pacific Railroad; Lincoln Pacific Railway
- LER - Logansport and Eel River Short-Line Company
- LERX - PSI Energy, Inc.
- LEVX - Level Energy, Inc.
- LEWU - Norman Lewis Tankers, BV
- LEWX - Sunny Farms, LLC
- LEYX - Wanda Petroleum Company
- LFAX - L.F. Anderson
- LFCD - Linea Coahuila Durango, SA de CV
- LFFZ - Burlington Northern and Santa Fe Railway; BNSF Railway
- LFPX - Lane Forest Products, Inc.
- LGAX - Lockheed-Georgia Company
- LGCX - La Prairie Group Contractors (Alberta), Ltd.
- LGEU - CATU Containers, SA
- LGEX - L.G. Everist, Inc.
- LGIX - Lincoln Grain, Inc.
- LGMX - Logistics Management Systems
- LGNZ - Burlington Northern and Santa Fe Railway; BNSF Railway
- LGSX - MidAmerican Energy Company
- LGTU - Liquid and Gas Transport, Inc.
- LGTX - Logistechs, Inc.
- LHFX - Lehigh Heavy Forge Corporation
- LHR - Lehigh and Hudson River Railway; Norfolk Southern
- LHRR - Longhorn Railroad
- LHTX - Larsen Farms
- LI - Long Island Rail Road
- LIBU - Lib Leasing
- LICU - Intermodal Container Service Ltd.
- LIMU - UTS Bernhardt Verhuizingen BV
- LIMX - Chemical Lime Company
- LINC - Lewis and Clark Railway
- LINU - Linde AG Geschaftsbereich
- LINX - GE Railcar Services Corporation
- LIRC - Louisville and Indiana Railroad
- LIRR - Lapeer Industrial Railroad
- LIRU - Roland Ltd.
- LISU - Lithuanian Shipping Company Ltd.
- LITU - Union Resources Ltd.
- LITX - Lite Industries, Inc.
- LIXU - Crosstrade Shipping Ltd.
- LKRR - Little Kanawha River Rail
- LKWR - Lackland Western Railroad
- LL - Poplar River Mine Railroad
- LLCX - LLCX, Inc.
- LLIX - LUC Leasing, Inc., Services Unlimited
- LLKX - Needham Transportation Company
- LLLX - Louisiana Leasing Limited Of Illinois
- LLPX - Locomotive Leasing Partners
- LLRR - Lake Line Railroad
- LM - Litchfield and Madison Railway, Chicago and North Western Railway, Union Pacific Railroad
- LMCU - World Container Leasing, Inc.
- LMCX - All Minerals Corporation
- LMIC - Lake Michigan and Indiana Railroad
- LMIX - Loram Maintenance of Way
- LMSX - Locomotive Management Services
- LMT - Louisiana Midland Transport
- LMTX - LMT Associates, Chartrand's Tank Car Service, Inc.
- LMWX - Railway Marketing Corporation, MHC, Inc. (subsidiary of ConAgra)
- LN - Louisville and Nashville Railroad, Seaboard System Railroad, CSX Transportation
- LNAC - Louisville, New Albany and Corydon Railroad
- LNAL - Louisville, New Albany and Corydon Railroad
- LNE - Lehigh and New England Railroad, Norfolk Southern
- LNO - Laona and Northern Railway
- LNTX - Alliant Energy
- LNVT - Landisville Terminal and Transfer Company
- LNW - Louisiana and North West Railroad
- LNWX - Locomotives Northwest, Ltd.
- LOAM - Louisiana Midland Railway
- LOCX - Mobile Locomotive Services, Inc.
- LOGU - Societe-Logemafer
- LOGX - Linden Leasing, Inc.
- LORU - Renzlor Securities Corporation
- LOSX - Locomotive Specialists, Inc.
- LOVX - American Colloid Company
- LOWU - Management Control and Maintenance, SA
- LOWX - Tosco Corporation
- LP - Lincoln Pacific Railway
- LPGX - Universal LPGX Company
- LPIU - Leasing Partners International, B.V.
- LPN - Longview, Portland and Northern Railway
- LPRR - Lincoln Pacific Railway
- LPRU - Losinjska Plovidba Mali Losing
- LPSG - Live Oak, Perry and South Georgia Railway
- LRAX - Latinoamerican Railroad Association, Inc.
- LRCX - Livingston Rebuild Center, Inc.
- LRDX - MidAmerican Energy Company
- LRIX - Lake Superior Eastern Rail Industries
- LRLX - Evans Railcar Leasing Company, GE Rail Services Corporation
- LRMX - Logistics Resource Management
- LRPA - Little Rock Port Railroad
- LRS - Laurinburg and Southern Railroad
- LRWN - Little Rock and Western Railroad
- LRWY - Lackawanna Railway
- LS - Luzerne Susquehanna Railway
- LSBC - La Salle and Bureau County Railroad
- LSBZ - Chicago Rail Link
- LSCX - D-H Investors (Relam Auditing Services)
- LSEU - One Way Lease, Inc.
- LSFZ - Burlington Northern and Santa Fe Railway; BNSF Railway
- LSI - Lake Superior and Ishpeming Railroad
- LSIU - L.S. Intertank
- LSIX - Liquid Sugars, Inc., ADM Transportation
- LSMX - Progress Rail Services Corporation
- LSO - Louisiana Southern Railway
- LSRC - Lake State Railway
- LSRR - Lone Star Railroad
- LSRX - Lake Superior Railroad Museum
- LSTT - Lake Superior Terminal and Transfer Railway
- LT - Lake Terminal Railroad
- LTC - Lafferty Transportation
- LTCR - Leelanau Transit Company
- LTCX - Union Carbide Corporation, Praxair, Inc.
- LTEX - L.H.A.G.S., Inc. (Larry's Truck and Electric Service)
- LTIU - Lloyd Triestine Di Navigazione, S.P.A.
- LTLZ - Burlington Northern and Santa Fe Railway; BNSF Railway
- LTTX - Trailer Train Company, TTX Company
- LTVX - LTV Steel Company
- LUBX - Philip Metals, Inc.
- LUCX - Railroad Car Management Company, Inc., Services Unlimited
- LUN - Ludington and Northern Railway
- LUNX - GE Rail Services Corporation
- LUSX - LUSCAR, Ltd.
- LUUX - Lux International Corporation
- LUX - Tosco Corporation
- LV - Lehigh Valley Railroad; Norfolk Southern
- LVAL - Lackawanna Valley Railroad
- LVRC - Lamoille Valley Railroad
- LVRR - Lycoming Valley Railroad
- LW - Louisville and Wadley Railway
- LWAX - Laidlaw Environmental Services
- LWIX - L and W Entertainment Company, Inc. (Milk and Cookies Railroad)
- LWR - Lakeland and Waterways Railway
- LWV - Conrail; Norfolk Southern
- LXOH - Lexington and Ohio Railroad
- LXVR - Luxapalila Valley Railroad
- LYKU - Lykes Brothers Steamship Company
- LYKZ - Lykes Brothers Steamship Company
- LYNX - Round Butte Products
- L&PS - London and Port Stanley Railway
