= Alps-Adriatic Rectors' Conference =

International network of universities and higher educational institutions

- Rectors' Conference of the Universities of the Alps Adriatic Region
- Abbreviation: AARC
- Named after: Alps-Adriatic region
- Formation: 1979; 47 years ago
- Founder: Anton Kolb
- Founded at: Graz, Austria
- Type: International academic network
- Headquarters: Klagenfurt, Austria
- Members: 40+ (2025)
- President: Péter Földesi; Széchenyi István University of Győr
- Main organ: Plenary Assembly
- Website: aarc.aau.at

The Alps-Adriatic Rectors' Conference (AARC) is an international network of universities and higher education institutions from the Alps-Adriatic region, established to promote cross-border cooperation in higher education, scientific research, and cultural exchange.

== History ==
The Alps-Adriatic Rectors' Conference was established in 1979 at the initiative of Anton Kolb, then Rector of the University of Graz, as the academic branch of the Alps-Adriatic Working Group, which had been founded a year earlier in Venice. Its founding aim was to institutionalise cooperation among the region's universities and to harness the potential of scientific and artistic exchange.

In 1981, the AARC adopted the document "Agreement on Working Procedures" and established the Scientific Committee, which continues to function as the conference's key operational body. The Rectors' Conference typically convenes once a year, while the Scientific Committee holds at least two sessions annually.

Initially, the network comprised institutions from nine regions; today, it includes over 50 universities from 19 regions, spanning countries such as Austria, Slovenia, Italy, Germany, Hungary, Croatia, Bosnia and Herzegovina, Serbia, and Albania. Since 2011, membership has been extended to institutions from the Western Balkans.

== Organisation ==
The permanent secretariat of the AARC is located at the Alpen-Adria University in Klagenfurt, where it serves as the administrative and communications hub of the network. The secretariat manages internal affairs, maintains the website, and liaises with other rectors' conferences and educational associations.

Among the AARC's notable initiatives is the Alps-Adriatic Scientific Award, granted for outstanding research achievements in the region. The organisation also provides support to students and academics affected by crisis situations, including armed conflicts and humanitarian challenges.

== See also ==
- European University Association
- Alps-Adriatic Working Group
