= Crk =

Crk may refer to:

- Adapter molecule crk
- CRK (disambiguation)
- Creek (disambiguation)
- Cookie Run: Kingdom
