= Amateur Radio Association of Bahrain =

- Abbreviation: ARAB
- Type: Non-profit organization
- Purpose: Advocacy, Education
- Location: Muharraq, Bahrain
- Region served: Bahrain
- Official language: Arabic
- President: Adel Khalifa Eid, A92FF
- Affiliations: International Amateur Radio Union
- Website: https://www.qsl.net/a92c/

The Amateur Radio Association of Bahrain (ARAB) is or was a national non-profit organization for amateur radio enthusiasts in Bahrain.

The organization uses ARAB as its official international abbreviation, based on the English translation of the organization's name. ARAB operates a QSL bureau for those members who regularly communicate with amateur radio operators in other countries. The ARAB represents the interests of amateur radio operators and shortwave listeners in Bahrain before national and international telecommunications regulatory authorities. ARAB was the national member society representing Bahrain in the International Amateur Radio Union, but in July 2016 the IARU suspended the ARAB's membership following a report that the association is not authorized to represent Bahrain radio amateurs internationally.

== See also ==
- Emirates Amateur Radio Society
- Kuwait Amateur Radio Society
- Qatar Amateur Radio Society
