= Longhorn Railroad =

Overview
- Parent company: Central of Tennessee Railway and Navigation Company (CofTR&N)
- Headquarters: Austin, Texas
- Locale: Texas
- Dates of operation: May 6, 1996–April 1, 2000
- Predecessors: RailTex (AUNW)
- Successors: Austin Area Terminal Railroad (AUAR)

Technical
- Track gauge: 4 ft 8 1/2 in (1,435 mm) standard gauge

The Longhorn Railroad (reporting mark LHRR) was a class III shortline railroad that operated as a division of the Central of Tennessee Railway and Navigation Company from May 6, 1996 up until April 1, 2000.

== History ==
=== Founding ===
The Longhorn Railroad was founded on May 6, 1996, where it would operate the former Austin and Northwestern Railroad (A&NW) lines inherited by RailTex. The LHRR would become a subsidiary of the Central of Tennessee Railway and Navigation Company (CofTR&N).

=== Disbanding ===
In March 2000, Capital Metro canceled their contract with Longhorn Railroad. The railroad ceased operations on April 1, 2000, being listed as "eliminated" in October 2000, while a new railroad was founded, the Austin Area Terminal Railroad, being launched by the Trans Global Solutions, which was a subsidiary of Econorail (ECRX).

LHRR later filed a lawsuit against Capital Metro, and won said lawsuit in December 2001.

== Locomotive fleet ==
The railroad had owned former Juniata Terminal locomotives such as GP10 #7250 and MT4 #8625. Most of their locomotives were leased from Econorail (ECRX). In 1997, while traffic was on the rise, the railroad would purchase four locomotives from two companies, these included; former Juniata Terminal SW1500 #9275, and another three locomotives from ECRX, these included Oregon, California and Eastern (OC&E) TE53-1-4E #7601, OC&E S3-3B slug #7606 and ECRX GP9 #8.

Once the railroad went defunct, GP10 #7250, MT4 #8625 and SW1500 #9275 were returned to ECRX. One locomotive from the LHRR had to be borrowed by a tourist railroad, the Austin and Texas Central Railroad (ATCR) between Austin and Burnet.
