= Organisasi Amatir Radio Indonesia =

Indeonesian radio organization

- Abbreviation: ORARI
- Type: Non-profit organization
- Purpose: Advocacy, Education
- Headquarters: Jakarta, Indonesia; OI33jt
- Region served: Indonesia
- Official language: Indonesian
- President: Donny Imam Priambodo YB0DX
- Affiliations: International Amateur Radio Union
- Website: http://orari.or.id/

The Organisasi Amatir Radio Indonesia (ORARI) (in English, Indonesian Amateur Radio Organization) is a national non-profit organization for amateur radio enthusiasts in Indonesia. According to a 2000 census compiled by the International Amateur Radio Union (IARU), Indonesia has the thirteenth-largest population of amateur radio operators in the world. A key membership benefit of the ORARI is a QSL bureau for those Indonesian amateur radio operators in regular communications with other amateur radio operators in foreign countries. The ORARI represents the interests of Indonesian amateur radio operators before Indonesian and international regulatory authorities. ORARI is the national member society representing Indonesia in the International Amateur Radio Union.

== Call areas ==
ORARI divides amateur radio privilege into four classes. The starting level is Pemula (Novice) with prefix YH. The general class is Siaga (Alert) whose prefix is YD/YG. The advanced level is Penggalang (Supporter) with the prefix of YC/YF. The highest level is Penegak (Extra Class) with the prefix of YB/YE. As a vast archipelago, Indonesia is divided into several call areas;

- Jakarta, call area 0, With 5 Local area is Local Central Jakarta, Local North Jakarta, Local West Jakarta, Local South Jakarta, Local East Jakarta.
- West Java / Banten, call area 1,
- Central Java - Jogjakarta, call area 2,
- East Java - Madura call area 3,
- South Sumatera - Lampung - Jambi - Bengkulu - Bangka Belitung, call area 4,
- Riau - Batam - West Sumatera, call area 5,
- North Sumatera - Aceh, call area 6,
- Kalimantan (Borneo) call area 7,
- Sulawesi (Celebes)- Maluku ( Moluccas)- Ternate call area 8,
- Bali - West Nusa Tenggara - East Nusa Tenggara - Papua, call area 9.

== See also ==
- International Amateur Radio Union
