= .tt =

Internet country code top-level domain for Trinidad and Tobago

- Introduced: September 3, 1991; 35 years ago
- TLD type: Country code top-level domain
- Status: Active
- Registry: Trinidad and Tobago Network Information Centre (TTNIC)
- Sponsor: University of the West Indies (Faculty of Engineering)
- Intended use: Entities connected with Trinidad and Tobago
- Actual use: Used largely in Trinidad and Tobago, with a scattering of other use including free third-level subdomains offered by outside vendor
- Registration restrictions: None (except under .gov.tt, .mil.tt and .edu.tt)
- Structure: Registrations permitted directly at second level or at third level beneath various labels
- Documents: Terms and conditions
- Dispute policies: UDRP
- Registry website: TTNIC

.tt is the internet country code top-level domain (ccTLD) in the Domain Name System of the Internet for Trinidad and Tobago.

The Trinidad and Tobago Network Information Centre (TTNIC) allows registrations under tt for second-level domains, and for third-level domains under the following domains: co.tt, com.tt, org.tt, net.tt, biz.tt, info.tt, pro.tt, int.tt, coop.tt, jobs.tt, mobi.tt, travel.tt, museum.tt, aero.tt, tel.tt and name.tt. Registration under the above domains is unrestricted and the registry does not require applicants to have a physical presence in Trinidad and Tobago. However, registrants with a foreign address are charged double.

In addition, there is mil.tt, restricted to entities in the Military of Trinidad and Tobago, edu.tt is a registry for educational institutions in Trinidad and Tobago, and gov.tt reserved for agencies of the government.

Domain hacks using .tt include ift.tt and mi.tt, URL shorteners used for IFTTT and the 2012 U.S. presidential campaign of Mitt Romney, respectively.

== See also ==
- Internet in Trinidad and Tobago
