= Texas DX Society =

The Texas DX Society, founded in 1970, is a non-profit organization of radio amateurs in Houston, Texas who have a primary interest in DX chasing and contesting on HF, VHF, and UHF.

== Activities ==
Many of the club's members regularly operate from rare amateur radio locations around the world for the expressed purpose of "putting out a new one" for DXCC credit to their fellow amateurs, or counting as a "new multiplier" for contests held on the bands each year. The TDXS repeaters are frequently used for disaster communication, and for public service events like the Chevron Houston Marathon, Buffalo Bayou Regatta Races, and others. The TDXS club callsign K5DX is in memory of our long-time friend and fellow club member Clarence E. Sharp, who became an SK in September 2001. Clarence was a world-famous DXer and contester, and an "Elmer" to all who needed one.
