= Pos Chiquito =

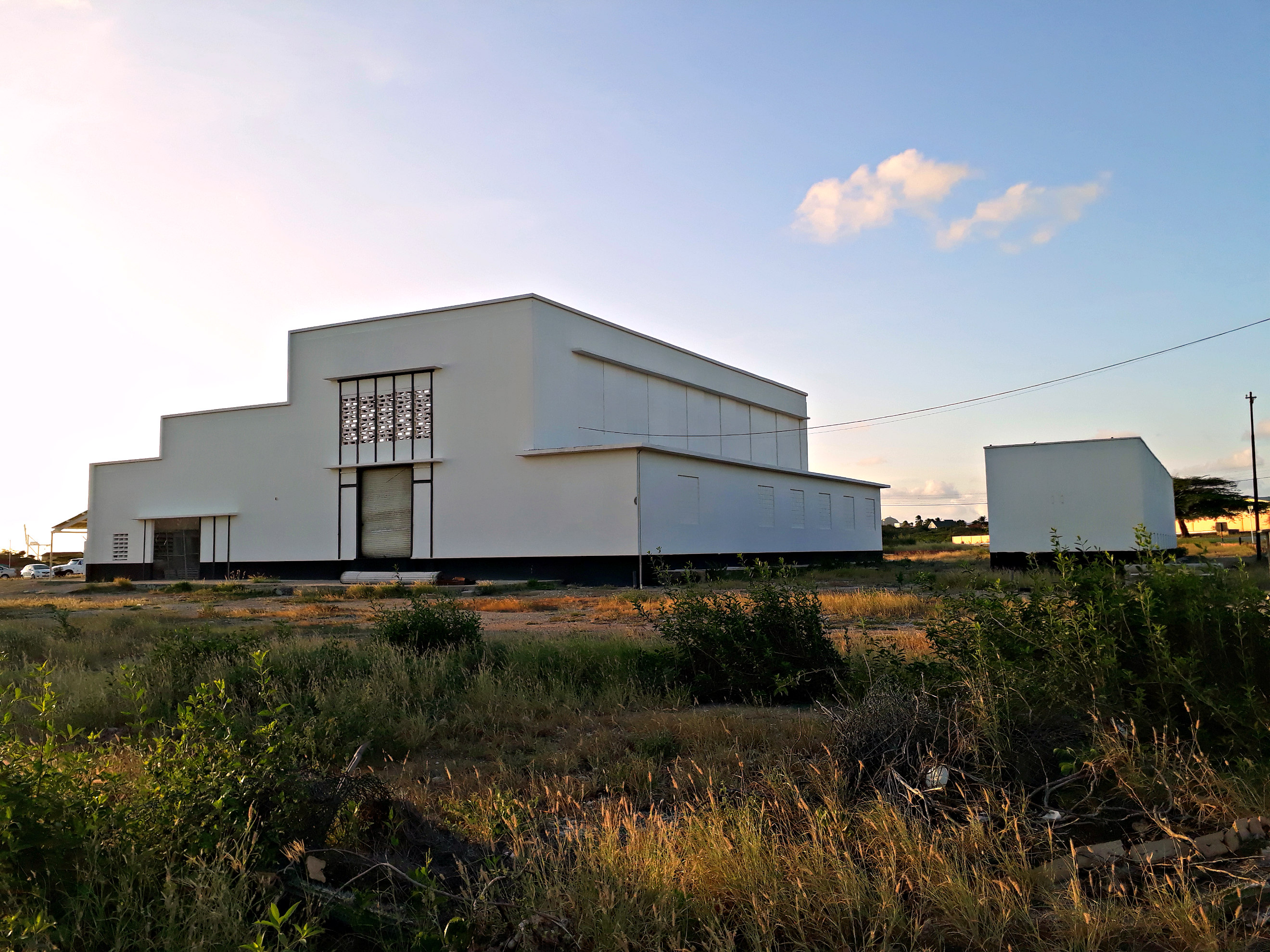
- Electrical substation at Pos Chiquito

- Location in Aruba
- Coordinates: 12.46508°N 69.96842°W
- State: Kingdom of the Netherlands
- Country: Aruba
- Region: Savaneta

Population (2010)
  - Total: 5,259

Pos Chiquito or Pos Chikito is a town in Savaneta on the island of Aruba. It is located on the main road between Oranjestad and San Nicolaas. It has become known for its coral reef, and has a small diving cove. Pos Chiquito is noted for its snorkelling, especially during September and October during the coral spawning season, and sea turtles and manta rays can be seen.
