= Donny Imam Priambodo =

Indonesian entrepreneur & politician

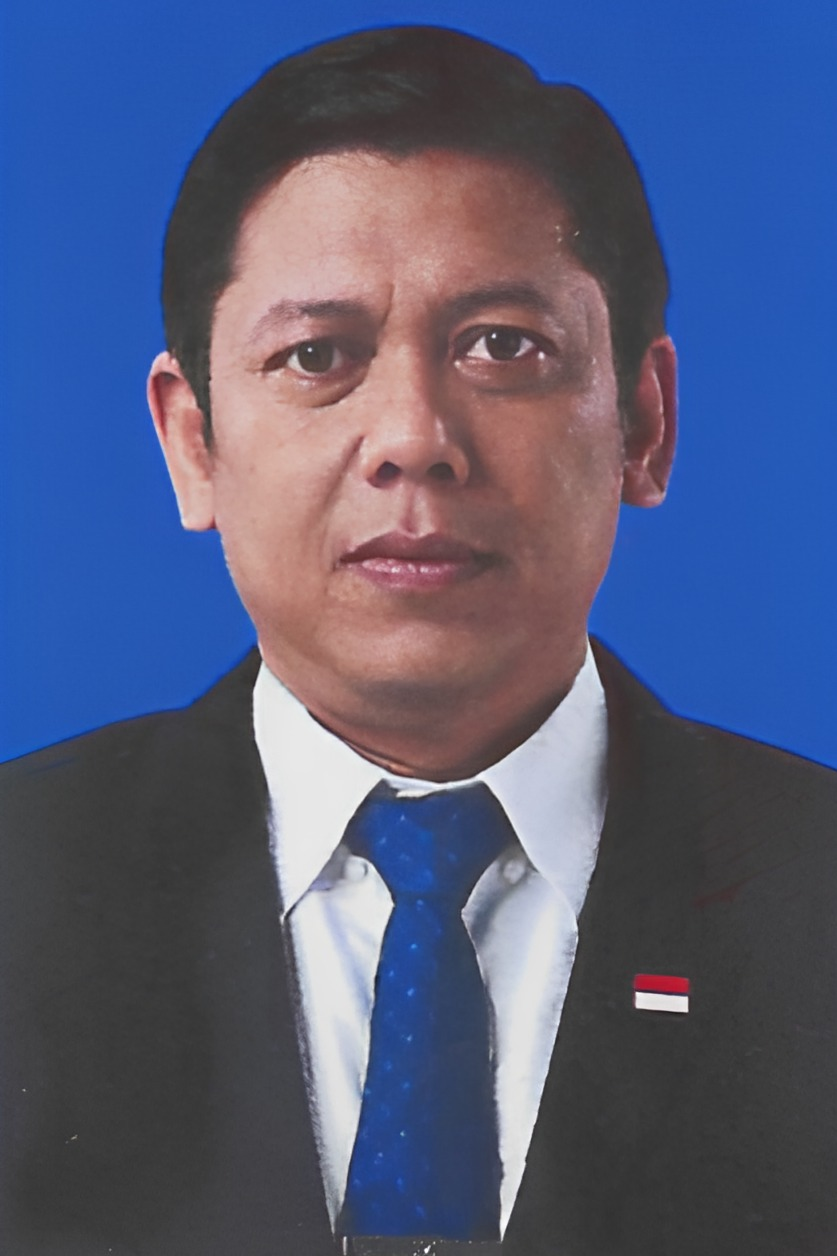

Indonesia House of Representative office

Personal details
- Born: Donny Imam Priambodo; December 23, 1973 (age 52) Jombang Regency, East Java, Indonesia
- Party: NASDEM
- Education: Sekolah Tinggi Teknik Surabaya (digital Electronics); Sekolah Tinggi Ilmu Ekonomi ABI Surabaya (Magister Management); University of Liverpool (Candidate Doctor of Business and Administration)
- Profession: Chairman of ARDA INDONESIA Group
- Awards: The Best Young Entrepreneur 2005; Yayasan Penghargaan Indonesia
- Website: donnypriambodo.com

Donny Imam Priambodo (born December 23, 1973) is an Indonesian entrepreneur and politician.

== Early life and career ==
Donny Imam Priambodo was born December 23, 1973, in Jombang, a small town in East Java, Indonesia. His father, late H. R. Imam Soepangkat, B.Sc. was employed by the state-owned sugar mills from 1972 to 2000, ever become an Administrator for Tjoekir & Jombang Baru Sugar Factory, and retired with last position of Corporate Secretary of PTPN X (PT Perkebunan Nusantara X, a state owned company). Because the number of sugar mills was brought under the auspices of PTPN X, and Priambodo's father moved a lot in several sugar factories because he was assigned, he grew up in a number of towns within Java and Sumatra.

In July 1992/1993, Priambodo enrolled in a Technic University in Surabaya, majoring in electronics. In his school years, he studied and became a lecturer's assistance. Because of his hobby in the field of electronics, in less than four years (in Indonesia to obtain a bachelor's degree one must be educated for at least four years). After graduating, Priambodo was directly appointed as lecturer, and taught electronics and digital system.

Priambodo was a lecturer between 1997 and late 1999 before he relocated to Bandung, West Java. In Bandung-West Java, he was directly appointed by a telecommunications contracting company, PT. Aprotech (Aprillia Profesional Technology) as technical director for one year, and moved to another company PT. Surya Duta Postelindo (Suryatelindo) in the same field, in 2001 as a finance director.

In 2002, Priambodo created his own company. His first venture, PT. Professional Telekomunikasi Indonesia (Protelindo), engaged in telecommunications infrastructure investments, particularly in providing antenna towers leasing and in building system (GSM Repeater) to cellular operators. Priambodo initiated a joint venture with Michael Gearon of American Tower, a US-based tower company. Due to the Indonesian government issuing a regulation that foreign ownership should be below 35%, the company was acquired by a local company, under the name of PT. Sarana Menara Nusantara. In 2006–2007, Priambodo merged his company with American Tower, and he established Arda Indonesia as a Holding & Investment Company.

After sold the company in the telecommunications field, Priambodo switched to electronic business specifically for the military, and founded the ARDA INDONESIA Group as a business entity. As a result, the company is currently fostered with his distant relative Mr.Rahardjo Pratjihno (PT.CMI Technology). It has been recognized by the government as the company's first domestic defense industry in Indonesia, particularly in the field of electronics systems.

In 2011, he established Arda Power Indonesia as subsidiary company of Arda Indonesia, and deals with Jet Fighter Escape System Parts of Martin Baker UK, as its exclusive agent in Indonesia.

== Political career: 2004–present ==
Donny Imam Priambodo's political career began in 2004, when he entered the board as a member of the Golkar Party Working Group on Social Welfare. From 2004 to 2009, he was very active in the party as well as a successful entrepreneur.

In the Golkar Party, he was appointed as the Deputy Commander of the SAR (Search and Rescue), and was also appointed as Treasurer of the Indonesian Volunteer (Golkar party formation).

In 2009, Priambodo was assigned a candidate member of the legislature party in the constituency of Central Java 3, which covers an area Grobogan, Blora, Rembang, and Pati. However, he failed to become a member.

In 2013, Priambodo joined the NasDem Party, which was founded by Surya Paloh. In 2014, Priambodo assigned by the party which was founded in 2012, became a member legislative candidate from the same constituency in 2009 elections. Having been known by people in the voting area, in 2014, Priambodo managed to become a member of the legislature. The party placed him at Finance and Banking Commission, at the House of Representatives this commission is appointed as Commission XI. He also appointed as Chief of Indonesia - Ukraine Parliament Bilateral Cooperation. During the term of 2019-2024 he was appointed by the NasDem Party to be chairman of the board of The Digital & Cyber. In the election of the president of Indonesian Amateur Radio Organization (ORARI, www.orari.or.id), in Nov 2021, he is elected become President Of ORARI for periods 2021–2026.
