= Mumbai Amateur Radio Society =

Indian amateur radio organization

- MARS logo
- Formation: 2000-08-07
- Type: Registered society
- Headquarters: Fort, Mumbai, India
- Location: Mumbai
- Members: 220
- Secretary: Huzefa Merchant
- Website: http://www.mumbaihams.org

The Mumbai Amateur Radio Society or MARS is an amateur radio club based in Mumbai, India. The club was founded on 7 August 2000 by a group of 25 active hams. Since then it has grown to over two hundred members and is the largest such club in the metropolis. MARS is a registered 80G tax-deductible non-profit organization.

The club undertakes several social activities such as providing communication support during the Ganpati Visarjan, setting up a quick response team for communications during emergencies, and monitoring flood situations during the monsoons. The organisation was mobilised during the 2006 Mumbai Train Bombings, 2005 Maharashtra floods, 2004 Indian Ocean earthquake and the 2001 Gujarat earthquake to provide the necessary communication links after established modes of communication were severed.

== Activities ==
MARS conducts several activities such as communication support during the Ganpati Visarjan, providing emergency radio services to civic organisations during calamities and disasters, homebrewing, amateur radio awareness drives, and contests such as foxhunts, and JOTA.

During the Visarjan, MARS sets up several stations at Girgaum Chowpatty, some on the procession trail, and others in the lifeguard towers, lost and found, medical, and on the speedboat providing a vital link between members of the public and various civic authorities. In 2007, MARS opened another unit at Juhu Beach. A total of 40 ham operators were involved during the event in 2007.

The club also conducts annual classes for those interested in becoming an amateur radio operators. Classes are usually conducted from July to September so that amateur enthusiasts can help out during the Visarjan and JOTA.

MARS works closely with the Wireless and Planning and Coordination Wing (WPC) of the Ministry of Communications, Government of India (which issues amateur radio licences in India) in coordinating licence exams in Mumbai and other activities such as moving base stations during amateur radio events, disasters and other exigencies.

== Club repeaters ==
MARS has set up a repeater tower operating at 144.1 MHz, located near Nana Chowk in South Mumbai, to provide line-of-sight coverage to the Mumbai agglomeration.

The call sign of MARS, VU2ST, was adopted in honour of the notable late ham operator Saad Ali.

== Future plans ==
MARS plans to try to persuade the Maharashtra government to introduce ham radio as a subject in the school syllabus in the city. This is on the lines of the Japanese government to provide support during earthquakes.

Another field in which the organisation is working, along with other amateur radio groups in India, is to shorten the waiting period for receiving an amateur radio licence. In the 1990s, the waiting period was two years. It has now been reduced to eight months.

== See also ==
- Amateur radio in India
- JNA Wireless Association
