= Macau Amateur Radio Society =

Chinese non-profit organization

澳門業餘無線電協會 Associação dos Radioamadores de Macau
- Abbreviation: ARM
- Type: Non-profit organization
- Purpose: Advocacy, Education
- Location(s): Macau, China; OL62se
- Region served: Macau
- Official language: Cantonese, Portuguese
- President: Saivo Leong XX9BB
- Affiliations: International Amateur Radio Union
- Website: http://www.arm.org.mo/

The Macau Amateur Radio Society (ARM; Chinese: 澳門業餘無線電協會; Portuguese: Associação dos Radioamadores de Macau) is a non-profit organization for amateur radio enthusiasts in Macau, China. ARM was established during Portuguese Macau. The organization's primary mission is to popularize and promote amateur radio in Macau and to serve the community of the Special Administrative Region. One membership benefit of the organization is a QSL bureau for members who regularly make communications with amateur radio operators in other countries. ARM is the member society representing Macau in the International Amateur Radio Union.

== See also ==
- Chinese Radio Amateurs Club
- Amateur radio licensing in China
- Chinese Radio Sports Association
- Chinese Taipei Amateur Radio League
- Hong Kong Amateur Radio Transmitting Society
