= Associacao de Radioamadores da Linha de Cascais =

Associação de Radioamadores da Linha de Cascais
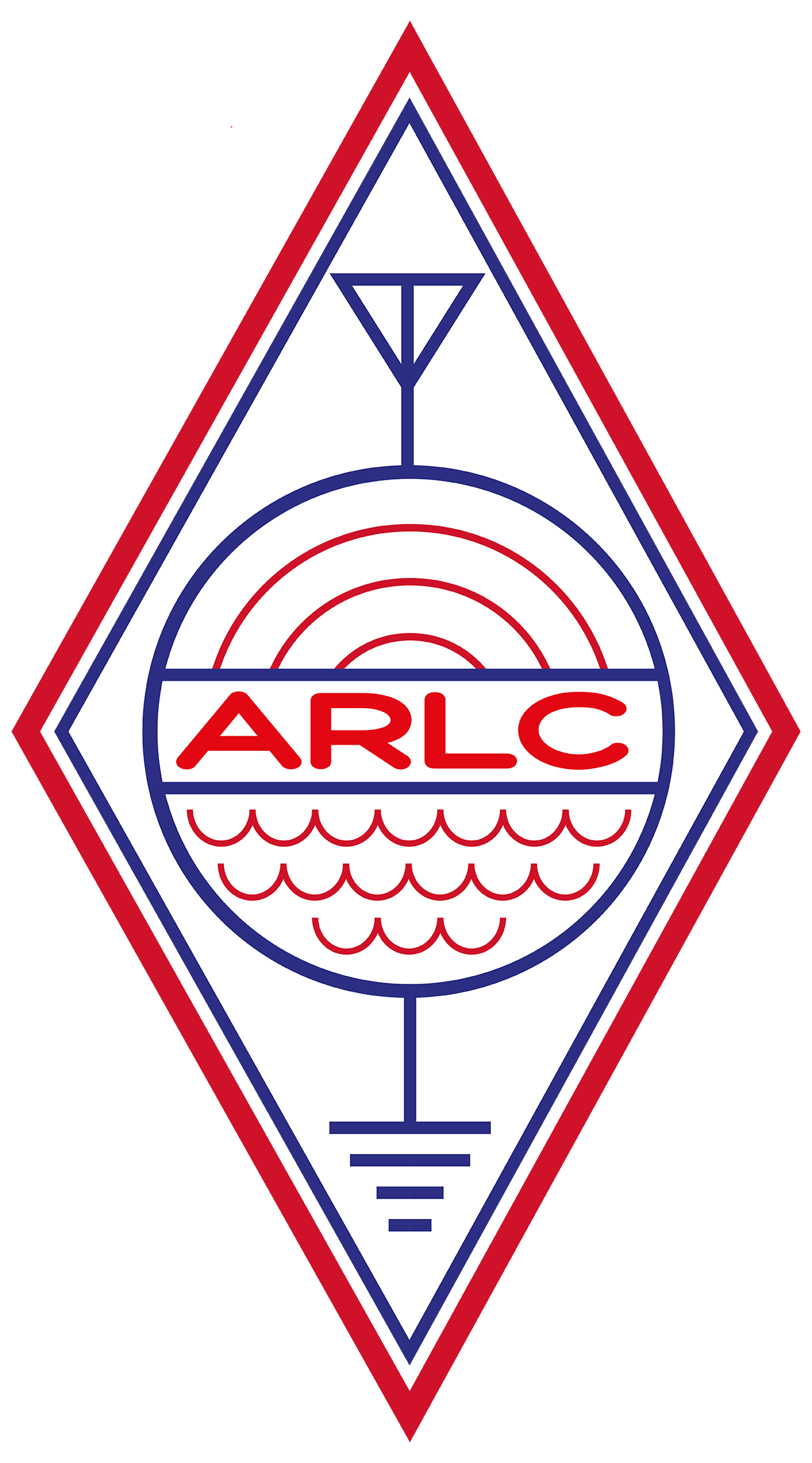
- Abbreviation: ARLC
- Formation: 2011
- Type: Non-profit organization and public utility association
- Purpose: Education for youngsters and work with emergency authorities to support amateur radio and science investigation
- Headquarters: Cascais, Portugal; IM58hr
- Region served: Portugal
- Official language: Portuguese
- Website: www.arlc.pt

The Associação de Radioamadores da Linha de Cascais, aka ARLC and Cascais Amateur Radio Association, was founded on 28 December 2011 to promote ham radio activity especially for youngsters, unite all amateurs, work with emergency authorities, and to support amateur radio and science investigation.

The association has no profits, and its members are only required to pay a yearly membership fee.

ARLC headquarters are at Alcabideche Fire Department.

The Association is recognised by ANACOM (Portuguese Communications Authority, equivalent to the American Federal Communications Commission.

Public utility status was issued by the Portuguese government to ARLC.

The association's ham radio callsign station is CS5ARLC.

== Analog radio repeater ==
- UHF analog repeater CQ0UCAS in Parque Natural Sintra Cascais, Peninha Sanctuary
  - TX: 439,275 MHz; Shift: -7,600 kHz; CTCSS/PL tone: 74.4 Hz
- Location in Google Maps

== Digital Radio Repeater ==
- UHF DMR MOTOROLA MOTOTRBO (R) repeater callsign CQ0UCSC located in Alcabideche, Cascais connected to Brandmeister worldwide network.
  - TX: 438,725 MHz; Shift: -7,600; Color Code 1
- Location in Google Maps
