= Larub, Kohgiluyeh =

Larub لاروب
- Village
- Location within Iran
- Coordinates: 31°03′29″N 50°36′40″E
- Country: Iran
- Province: Kohgiluyeh and Boyer-Ahmad
- County: Kohgiluyeh
- Bakhsh: Central
- Rural District: Doshman Ziari

Population (2006)
  - Total: 25
- Time zone: UTC+3:30 (IRST)
  - Summer (DST): UTC+4:30 (IRDT)

Larub (Persian: لاروب, also Romanized as Lārūb; also known as Lārāp and Lārū) is a village in Doshman Ziari Rural District, in the Central District of Kohgiluyeh County, Kohgiluyeh and Boyer-Ahmad Province, Iran. At the 2006 census, its population was 25, in 5 families.
