= Malaysian Amateur Radio Transmitters' Society =

- Abbreviation: MARTS
- Formation: 1952
- Type: Non-profit organisation
- Purpose: Advocacy, Education
- Location(s): Kuala Lumpur, Malaysia; OJ03ud
- Region served: Malaysia
- Official language: English, Malay
- President: Mohammud Aris bin Bernawi (9M2IR)
- Affiliations: International Amateur Radio Union
- Website: www.marts.org.my

The Malaysian Amateur Radio Transmitters' Society (MARTS) is a non-profit organisation for amateur radio enthusiasts in Malaysia. MARTS was founded in 1952 and became a National Society ever since. The organisation's primary mission is to popularise and promote amateur radio in Malaysia. One membership benefit of the organisation is a QSL bureau for members who regularly make communications with amateur radio operators in other countries. MARTS is the member society representing Malaysia in the International Amateur Radio Union.

== See also ==
- Singapore Amateur Radio Transmitting Society
