= Qatar Amateur Radio Society =

- Abbreviation: QARS
- Type: Non-profit organization
- Purpose: Advocacy, Education
- Location(s): Doha, Qatar LL55si
- Region served: Qatar
- Members: Approximately 500
- Official language: Arabic
- President: H.E. Abdullah Bin Hamad Al-Attiyah
- Vice-president: Ahmed Al Muhannadi
- Affiliations: International Amateur Radio Union
- Website: http://www.qsl.net/a71a/ http://www.qrz.com/db/A71a

The Qatar Amateur Radio Society (QARS) is a national non-profit organization for amateur radio enthusiasts in Qatar. The organization uses QARS as its official international abbreviation, based on the English translation of the organization's name. QARS operates a QSL bureau for those members who regularly communicate with amateur radio operators in other countries.

The QARS represents the interests of amateur radio operators and shortwave listeners in Qatar before national and international telecommunications regulatory authorities. QARS is the national member society representing Qatar in the International Amateur Radio Union.

== Management ==
The organization is headed by (as of 2012) Abdullah Bin Hamad Al-Attiyah. Ahmed Al-Muhannadi serves as the vice-president.

== Overview ==
In 2010, the Q-Post issued a stamp commemorating the QARS. This was the first time a postal service in the Middle East paid tribute to an amateur radio organization.

The QARS was involved in a cooperative project with the Qatar Satellite Company in 2014 to help secure the launch of Es'hail 2, a communications satellite that is set to carry analog and digital amateur radio transponders.

== See also ==
- Amateur Radio Association of Bahrain
- Emirates Amateur Radio Society
- Kuwait Amateur Radio Society
