= Chinese Taipei Amateur Radio League =

Non-profit organization based in Taiwan

- 中華民國業餘無線電促進會
- Abbreviation: CTARL
- Type: Non-profit organization
- Purpose: Advocacy, Education
- Location(s): Taipei, Taiwan; PL04px
- Official language: Chinese
- President: Bolon Lin BV5AF
- Affiliations: International Amateur Radio Union
- Website: http://www.ctarl.org.tw/

The Chinese Taipei Amateur Radio League (CTARL; Chinese: 中華民國業餘無線電促進會) is a national non-profit organization based in Taiwan for amateur radio enthusiasts. Key membership benefits of the organization include QSL bureau services and a monthly membership magazine called HamFormosa, CTARL represents the interests of amateur radio operators before telecommunications authorities in Taiwan as well as international authorities. CTARL is the member society representing Taiwan in the International Amateur Radio Union.

== See also ==
- Associação dos Radioamadores de Macau
- Chinese Radio Sports Association
- Hong Kong Amateur Radio Transmitting Society
- Chinese Taipei
