= Singapore Amateur Radio Transmitting Society =

Organization

- Abbreviation: SARTS
- Formation: 26 August 1968 in Singapore
- Type: Non-profit organization
- Purpose: Advocacy, Education
- Location(s): Singapore OJ11wg
- Region served: Singapore
- Official language: English
- President: James Brooks, 9V1YC
- Affiliations: International Amateur Radio Union
- Website: https://www.sarts.org.sg/

The Singapore Amateur Radio Transmitting Society (SARTS) is a non-profit organization for amateur radio enthusiasts in Singapore.

== Background ==
Founded on 26 August 1968, the organization's primary mission is to popularize and promote amateur radio in Singapore. SARTS sponsors amateur radio operating awards and operates special event stations on a regular basis. SARTS is the member society representing Singapore in the International Amateur Radio Union.

== See also ==
- Malaysian Amateur Radio Transmitters' Society
