= Ak-Sar-Ben Amateur Radio Club =

Ak-Sar-Ben (AkSarBen) Amateur Radio Club Inc.
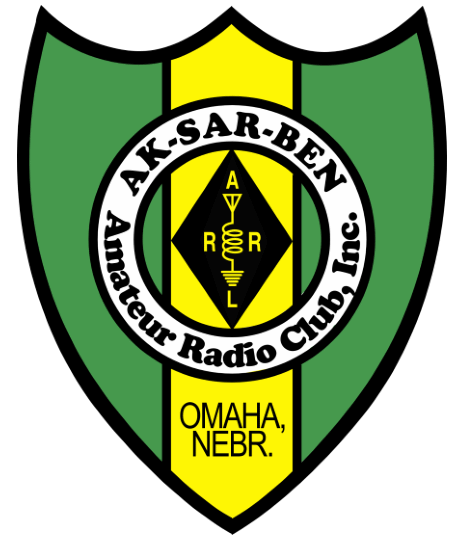
- AkSarBen Amateur Radio Club
- Abbreviation: AARC
- Formation: Before 1945
- Type: Non-Profit
- Location: Omaha, NE
- Region served: Omaha Metro Area
- Main organ: Ham Hum
- Affiliations: American Radio Relay League
- Website: http://www.aksarbenarc.org
- Remarks: FM Repeater on 146.940Mhz (-600Khz)

Although there is anecdotal evidence of an amateur radio club in Omaha prior to World War II, The Ak-Sar-Ben Amateur Radio Club (AARC), as it exists today, was started in 1945 and has been affiliated with the American Radio Relay League (ARRL) since that time. The club is not affiliated with The Knights of Ak-Sar-Ben.

The AARC has members involved in nearly every aspect of ham radio from DXing (distant station) to digital communications such as packet Radio and D-STAR to high-speed multimedia radio (HSMM). The membership ranges from new hams just starting their amateur radio "career" to seasoned hams willing to share their knowledge. The AARC holds monthly meetings on the second Friday of each month. Meetings are held at the Heartland Chapterhouse of the American Red Cross 2912 S 80th Ave, in Omaha.

Members also meet "on the air" on Monday evenings at 9:00 p.m. on the KØUSA 2-meter repeater on 146.940(-) MHz.

The AARC supports the Amateur Radio Emergency Services (ARES) and encourages members participation in the Douglas County ARES organization. Douglas County ARES has a working relationship with Douglas County, Nebraska Douglas County Emergency Management Agency, the Omaha Metro Medical Response System (OMMRS). ARES members are trained weather spotters under the National Weather Service's SKYWARN Program. The AARC hosts ARES Activities on the club's KØUSA 146.940 repeater. Douglas County ARES holds weekly training and information nets on Sunday nights at 9:00 p.m. using the KØUSA Repeater.

In support of the disaster and emergency communications, the club owns a variety of antennas, radios and generators that are available for deployment to assist with communication needs. The club tests its equipment stores annually during the ARRL's Field Day. Field Day allows operators to learn the skills that make amateur radio that "go to" communications medium when normal lines of communication fail or are over loaded. The AARC uses the event to encourage members in their knowledge of getting their station back on the air and away from their homes.

After the 1975 tornado Omaha built a new emergency operations center. Because of the critical role that the Ak-Sar-Ben Amateur Radio Club played in the response to the disaster, the club was awarded a $10,000 grant from the City of Omaha to outfit a communications room with amateur radio equipment. The communications operation has expanded over the years to include two HF capable radios, four VHF/UHF stations, packet radio, APRS, Amateur Television and most recently D-STAR.

== Activities ==
- Monthly meetings
- Annual ARRL Field Day
- Museum Ships Weekend
- Jamboree-On-The-Air
- Licensing Classes
- VE Testing
- Flea Market
- Transmitter Hunts
- Public Education Events - Omaha Safety Expo
- ARES Support
- OMMRS Support
- Stragetic Air and Space Museum's Indoor Air Show
- ARRL National Parks on the Air - 2017
- Social Events

The AARC also provides communications support to a variety of events including

- MS Walk
- Corporate Cup
- Market-To-Market Relay Race
- CROP Walk
- Nebraska State Track Meet
- Omaha Cycling Weekend
- Dave Babcook Memorial Bike Race
- Annual Visual Siren Inspection*
- SKYWARN Activation*
- Omaha Metro Medical Response System Activations*
- Offutt Air Force Base MARE Drill*

Items with a "*" are coordinated by Douglas County ARES and supported by the Ak-Sar-Ben Amateur Radio Club

Communications support is provided FREE of charge as per FCC regulations (Title 47 CFR Part 97). Even though the AkSarBen Amateur Radio Club is a 501(c)3 organization, no donation is requested or expected for our services.
