= JNA Wireless Association =

Indian amateur radio organization

- Formation: 1988
- Type: Association
- Headquarters: Nana Chowk, Mumbai, India
- Location: Mumbai
- Secretary: Sudhir Sha
- Website: http://members.tripod.com/~VU2JNA/

JNA Wireless Association is an amateur radio organisation based in Mumbai (formerly Bombay) in India. JNA was founded in 1988 in memory of late avid amateur radio operator, Jamshed N. Anklesaria (callsign: VU2JNA) who died in 1987. The organisation, currently headed by Sudhir Shah (VU2SVS) conducts classes and organises scramble teams to tackle disasters.

== History ==
The organisation was formed in 1988, in memory of Jamshed N. Anklesaria who died after suffering a heart-attack in 1987. Anklesaria was a bachelor who invested much of his time amateur radio, and radio equipment. After his death, instead of selling off the equipment, Anklesaria's brother requested current secretary, to perpetuate Jamshed's memory. Shah, along with P Venkatraman and a few others then started the JNA Wireless Association with the equipment donated by Jamshed's brother. The JNA has since then organised several classes and handled disasters around the city.

== Classes ==
JNA has been conducting amateur radio classes in Mumbai for over ten years. After a brief lull, JNA restarted its amateur radio classes in 2008, with two batches held at Malabar Hill and Vile Parle.

== Disaster management ==
JNA has its own dedicated 70-member scrambler team and has a long history in handling disaster management. In 1993, JNA set up the first communication station at Killari, the epicenter of the 1993 Latur earthquake that killed 8,000. Headed by Sudhir Shah, JNA provided live communication between Killari and the state headquarters at Mantralaya in Mumbai. It broadcast messages relating to the extent of damage, extent of the calamity, and other life-saving messages.

In 2008, the Brihanmumbai Municipal Corporation (BMC) included JNA as part of its disaster management operations to provide emergency communication support during the monsoons to provide live updates on the flooding situation in the city. Five stations were set up at Nana Chowk, Milan Subway, Kalina, Santacruz, and Chembur and were linked up to the main control centre at the BMC headquarters at Fort. In addition, another station, staffed by Shah was set up at Malabar Hill with the help of the Malabar Hill Residents Association.

== See also ==
- Amateur radio in India
- Mumbai Amateur Radio Society
