= International Amateur Radio Club =

- Abbreviation: IARC
- Formation: 1961
- Head: Mr. Attila MATAS, OM1AM
- Parent organization: International Telecommunication Union

The International Amateur Radio Club (IARC) maintains and operates the amateur radio station 4U1ITU at the International Telecommunication Union building in Geneva, Switzerland. Intended to serve as a model of amateur radio operation, the station was created under the auspices of the Secretary-General of the United Nations and the Secretary-General of the International Telecommunication Union (ITU).

In many radio contests, amateur radio operators are allowed to consider the International Telecommunication Union station 4U1ITU a special entity and because of its significance to world telecommunications it is given similar status to a separate country when making a radio contact. IARC is one of two UN stations considered for such status, the other being 4U1UN at the Headquarters of the United Nations.

== See also ==
- International Amateur Radio Union

== Publications ==
- Telecommunication Journal International Telecommunication Union Geneva, International Telecommunication Union ISSN 0497-137X, OCLC 1779312
