= Kuwait Amateur Radio Society =

Amateur radio organization

الجمعية الكويتية لهواة اللاسلكي Kuwait Amateur Radio Society
- Abbreviation: KARS
- Formation: 1979
- Type: Non-profit organization
- Purpose: Advocacy, Education
- Location(s): Safat, Kuwait; LL49ah
- Region served: Kuwait
- Official language: Arabic
- Chairman: Hamad Alnusif, 9K2HN
- Affiliations: International Amateur Radio Union
- Website: http://9k2ra.net/

The Kuwait Amateur Radio Society (KARS) (in Arabic, الجمعية الكويتية لهواة اللاسلكي) is a national non-profit organization for amateur radio enthusiasts in Kuwait. The organization uses KARS as its official international abbreviation, based on the English translation of the organization's name. KARS runs a QSL bureau for members who frequently interact with international amateur radio operators and provides them with radio equipment. KARS represents the interests of Kuwaiti amateur radio operators and shortwave listeners before Kuwaiti and international telecommunications regulatory authorities. KARS is the national member society representing Kuwait in the International Amateur Radio Union. Board members:Hamad Alnusif, 9K2HN ( Chairman ), Eng. Faisal Alajmi, 9K2RR ( Vice Chairman ), Waleed Abul, 9K2OK ( General Secretary ), Basel Albaker, 9K2RX ( Treasurer ), Ahmad Ali, 9K2QA ( member ), Nawaf Almuharib, 9K2NM ( member ), Ali Mubarak, 9K2SS ( member )

A founding member was His Highness Sheikh Mishal Al-Ahmad Al-Jaber Al-Sabah, the Emir of Kuwait since December 2023.

== See also ==
- Amateur Radio Association of Bahrain
- Emirates Amateur Radio Society
- Qatar Amateur Radio Society
