= European Radio Amateurs' Organization =

- Logo of EURAO
- Abbreviation: EURAO
- Formation: 2005
- Type: INGO
- Purpose: Lobbying
- Headquarters: Saint-Pierre-dels-Forcats, France
- Region served: Worldwide
- Official language: English
- President: Petrica, YO9RIJ
- Main organ: Board of Directors
- Budget: €3000 (2017)
- Website: www.eurao.org

The European Radio Amateurs' Organization (EURAO), registered as an official association in 2014, is an association of independent amateur radio associations in Europe. The association focuses on the individuals engaged in the amateur radio hobby, rather than the hobby itself, and so it includes members from outside Europe.

== History ==
In 2005 the first idea of EURAO arose, and immediately several European radio amateurs' associations started to strengthen their relationship and to work together, becoming a de facto association.

In 2009 these associations constituted a promoters committee with the aim to do the necessary steps to fully legalize the organization.

In 2010 the EuroBureauQSL service was launched like a coordinated network of QSL bureaus members already run.

In 2011 the first face-to-face meeting took place in Barcelona, Spain.

In 2012 was the international official presentation at the ham radio fair, in Friedrichshafen, Germany.

In 2013 the first statutes were approved, and a board of directors elected.

In 2014 the headquarters was settled in France and became a registered/declared association under the law of 1 July 1901.

In 2015 a letter of understanding was signed with the European Conference of Postal and Telecommunications Administrations and Electronic Communications Committee.

In 2016 EURAO members participated in two CEPT/ECC/WGFM meetings, in Helsinki and Bordeaux.

In 2017 EURAO had the first formal meeting with IARU region 1.

In 2018 the United Nations Economic and Social Council endorsed the special consultative status to EURAO.

In 2019 EURAO was admitted as a Radiocommunications Sector member of International Telecommunication Union.

=== Membership ===
EURAO has three categories of members: associations, individual, and clubs and groups.

Different conditions and fees apply for each category. All of them have the right of voice. Only associations have voting rights.

=== General assembly ===
All members of the organization.

=== Board of directors ===
The current member (as of July 2025) of the board of directors are:

- President: Petrica, YO9RIJ
- Vice-president: Giorgio, IW3IBG
- Secretary-General: Sam, EA3CIW
- Treasurer: none (previously Joan Lluís, EA3CWZ)
