= LaRue (disambiguation) =

LaRue, Larue or La Rue is a surname of French origin and less frequently a given name.

LaRue, Larue or La Rue may also refer to:

== Places in the United States ==
- Larue, Arkansas, an unincorporated community
- La Rue, Illinois, an unincorporated community
- LaRue County, Kentucky
- LaRue, Ohio, a village
- LaRue, Texas, an unincorporated community
- La Rue, Wisconsin, an unincorporated community

== Music ==
- LaRue (band), a Christian rock duo
  - LaRue (album), the duo's first studio album, released in 2000
- "La rue", a song by Gazo

== See also ==
- La Roux, a British electropop synth band
- De La Rue, an English company
- Delarue (disambiguation)
- Leroux
