= Central of Tennessee Railway and Navigation Company =

Overview
- Reporting mark: CTRN
- Locale: Tennessee
- Dates of operation: 1992–2000
- Successor: Nashville and Western Railroad

Technical
- Track gauge: 4 ft 8 1/2 in (1,435 mm) standard gauge

The Central of Tennessee Railway and Navigation Company (CTRN, CTR, Centennrail) is a defunct railroad company in Tennessee, United States. Centennrail began railroad freight operations on June 19, 1992.

Later, and to the moment of ceasing its operation the company was also doing business as the Longhorn Railway Company.

Interstate Commerce Commission (ICC) Finance Docket No. 32049 (Sub-No. 1), decided July 15, 1992, stated that Centennrail intended to operate a rail line from milepost 205 at Nashville, Tennessee, to milepost 180 at Ashland City, Tennessee, a distance of 25 miles with 3 miles of switching leads. The line itself was owned by Cheatham County Rail Authority (CCRA), which purchased it from the Illinois Central Gulf Railroad Company (BA No.1516) (ICG) in 1988 after ICG abandoned it. The previous operator of the railroad was McCormick, Ashland City & Nashville Railroad Co., Inc. (BA No.5518).

As the Longhorn Railway Company, at the time of the discontinuance of service in August 2000, it operated a rail line on the former Austin and Northwestern Railroad owned by Capital Metropolitan Transportation Authority (CMTA) extending between milepost 0.0 west of Giddings, Texas, and milepost 154.07 at Llano, Texas, including the Marble Falls Branch (6.43 miles), the Scobee Spur (3.3 miles), and the Burnett Spur (.93 miles), a distance of approximately 162 miles in Bastrop, Burnet, Lee, Llano, Travis and Williamson Counties, Texas. The lines traverse U.S. Postal Service ZIP codes 78605, 78611, 78613, 78639, 78641, 78642, 78643, 78650, 78653, 78654, 78701, 78702, 78705, 78717, 78721, 78722, 78723, 78727, 78728, 78729, 78751, 78753, 78756, 78757, 78758, 78759, and 78959. The line includes the stations of Giddings, Hills, Paige, McDade, Butler, Stacks, Elgin, Manor, Milby, Decker, Smoot, Austin Depot, Austin Junction, Buttercrust, Abercrombie, Fromme, McNeil, Rutledge, Whitestone, Leander, Liberty Hill, Bertram, Summit, Burnet, Gandy, DeMarco, Sudduth, Fairland, Scobee, Kingsland.
