= Chinese Radio Sports Association =

中国无线电和定向运动协会 Chinese Radio Sports And Orienteering Association
- Abbreviation: CRSAOA
- Formation: April 3, 1964
- Type: Non-profit organization
- Purpose: Advocacy, Education
- Location: Beijing, China
- Region served: People's Republic of China
- Official language: Chinese
- President: Zhao Mingyu BD1MYZ
- Affiliations: International Amateur Radio Union
- Website: crsoa.sport.org.cn/index/

The Chinese Radio Sports And Orienteering Association (CRSAOA) (in simplified Chinese, 中国无线电和定向运动协会) is a national non-profit organization for amateur radio enthusiasts in the People's Republic of China. The CRSA's primary mission is to popularize and promote amateur radio in China. Early activities of the organization focused on radiosport, and the CRSA was active in promoting Amateur Radio Direction Finding and High Speed Telegraphy competitions throughout the country. Although the CRSA has broadened its scope and now supports many kinds of radio activities, the organization's name continues to reflect this early heritage. Key membership benefits of the organization include QSL bureau services, and a quarterly membership magazine called Ham's CQ. CRSA was also responsible for the administration of the amateur radio license certification program in the People's Republic of China until 2010.Former Chinese Radio Sports Association.

== History ==
The Chinese Radio Sports Association was founded on April 3, 1964. The organization initially focused on radiosport activities, specifically High Speed Telegraphy and Amateur Radio Direction Finding. It is the national member society representing the People's Republic of China in the International Amateur Radio Union, which it joined in 1984. Prior to 1993, the only licensed amateur radio stations in the People's Republic of China were club stations shared by multiple individuals, and the CRSA was an association of local amateur radio clubs. After 1993, the organization opened its membership to individual amateur radio operators and was given the responsibility of administering the amateur radio license certification program for the country.. The CRSA was the host organization for the 2000 World Amateur Radio Direction Finding Championships, which were held October 13–18 in Nanjing.

== Emergency communications ==
The CRSA provides structured organizational support for amateur radio emergency communications in the People's Republic of China. In January 2009, the American Radio Relay League recognized the CRSA by conferring the 2008 ARRL Humanitarian Award jointly to the Chinese Radio Sports Association and the Sichuan Radio Sports Association for their communications support during the disaster response following the May 2008 Sichuan earthquake that killed an estimated 69,000 people. In granting the award, the ARRL praised the CRSA as an organization that "exemplified the highest level of dedication to public service."

== See also ==
- Associação dos Radioamadores de Macau
- Chinese Taipei Amateur Radio League
- Hong Kong Amateur Radio Transmitting Society
