= Aruba Amateur Radio Club =

- Abbreviation: AARC
- Formation: 1957
- Type: Non-profit organization
- Purpose: Advocacy, Education
- Location(s): Pos Chiquito, Aruba; FK52al
- Region served: Aruba
- President: Emily Thiel P43E (Silent Key 12 April 2018)
- Affiliations: International Amateur Radio Union
- Website: http://www.qsl.net/aarc/

The Aruba Amateur Radio Club (AARC) is a national non-profit organization for amateur radio enthusiasts in Aruba. AARC operates a QSL bureau for those members who regularly communicate with amateur radio operators in other countries. The organization operates amateur radio repeaters located at points of high elevation on Sero Yamanota that can be accessed from around the island, from Curaçao, and parts of Venezuela. AARC represents the interests of Aruban amateur radio operators before Aruban and international telecommunications regulatory authorities. AARC is the national member society representing Aruba in the International Amateur Radio Union.
