= Hong Kong Amateur Radio Transmitting Society =

- 香港業餘電台聯會
- Abbreviation: HARTS
- Formation: 1930
- Type: Charitable organization
- Purpose: Advocacy, Education, Charity
- Headquarters: 429 Cha Kwo Ling Road, Yau Tong, Kowloon
- Location(s): Hong Kong, China; OL72ch
- Region served: Hong Kong
- Official language: English, Cantonese
- President: Rudy Wong
- Vice President: C.H. Ho
- Honorary Secretary: Andrew Woo
- Honorary Treasurer: Andrew Cheong
- Main organ: Executive Committee
- Affiliations: International Amateur Radio Union
- Budget: Donation, Membership Fee
- Website: https://www.harts.org.hk/
- Remarks: Facebook Page address: https://www.facebook.com/HARTSCSSC

The Hong Kong Amateur Radio Transmitting Society (HARTS, Chinese: 香港業餘電台聯會) is an organization representing a majority of the amateur radio operators in Hong Kong. HARTS is a charitable institution recognized by the Inland Revenue Department since early 2008. HARTS was established in October 1929, when Hong Kong was a dependent territory of the United Kingdom. HARTS is the member society representing Hong Kong in the International Amateur Radio Union.

The organization's primary mission is to popularize and promote amateur radio in Hong Kong. HARTS operates and maintains beacons and repeaters at Tai Mo Shan, Tate's Cairn, Victoria Peak, and Tin Shui Wai. The organization has provided communications support for charitable groups and events, and has formed a support network for amateur radio emergency communications. One membership benefit of the organization is a QSL bureau for members who regularly make communications with amateur radio operators in other countries.

== See also ==
- Associação dos Radioamadores de Macau
- Chinese Radio Sports Association
- Chinese Taipei Amateur Radio League
