= Swedish Society of Radio Amateurs =

- Föreningen Sveriges Sändareamatörer
- Abbreviation: SSA
- Type: Non-profit organization
- Purpose: Advocacy, Education
- Location(s): Sollentuna, Sweden JO89xk
- Region served: Sweden
- Members: 5,500
- Official language: Swedish
- President: Jens Zander, SM0HEV/SM1HEV
- Affiliations: International Amateur Radio Union
- Staff: 2
- Website: http://www.ssa.se/

The Swedish Society of Radio Amateurs (Swedish: Föreningen Sveriges Sändareamatörer, SSA) is a national non-profit organization for amateur radio enthusiasts in Sweden. Key membership benefits of the SSA include the sponsorship of amateur radio operating awards, radio contests, and a QSL bureau for members who regularly communicate with amateur radio operators in other countries. SSA represents the interests of Swedish amateur radio operators before Swedish and international telecommunications regulatory authorities. The SSA publishes a membership magazine called QTC. SSA is the national member society representing Sweden in the International Amateur Radio Union.

== See also ==
- International Amateur Radio Union
