= Association des Radioamateurs du Kayldall =

- ADRAD logo animated
- Abbreviation: ADRAD Kayldall
- Type: Non-profit organization
- Purpose: Science, Education
- Location: Luxembourg
- Region served: Luxembourg
- Official language: Luxembourgish, French, German, English
- President: Claude Specht LX1SC
- Website: http://www.adrad-kayldall.lu

The Association des Radioamateurs du Kayldall (ADRAD) is a local non-profit organization for amateur radio enthusiasts in Luxembourg. The ADRAD was founded on March 30, 1979.

The ADRAD operates several radio repeaters on its own repeater-site, operates radio beacons on UHF and SHF, organizes regular ham-meetings, issues an amateur radio award and hosts a club-shop. In 2014 the ADRAD organised the first European DMR contest on UHF. Members of the ADRAD take part in worldwide amateur radio contests.

== Amateur radio repeaters operated by the ADRAD ==
As of 2016 the ADRAD operates 2 voice repeaters

Callsign	Locator	Frequency	Shift	Mode	Echolink
LX0DRR	JN29xk	145.7875 MHz	-0.6 MHz	FM and DMR	-
LX0RU	JN29xk	438.750 MHz	-7.6 MHz	FM and DMR	268062

== Amateur radio beacons operated by the ADRAD ==
As of 2016 the ADRAD operates 2 radio beacons on UHF and SHF .

Callsign	Locator	Frequency
LX0AO	JN29wm	1296.935 MHz
LX0AOK	JN29wm	2320.935 MHz
