= Suomen Radioamatööriliitto =

Finnish organization for amateur radio enthusiasts

Suomen Radioamatööriliitto Finnish Amateur Radio League
- Abbreviation: SRAL
- Formation: 1921
- Type: Non-profit organization
- Purpose: Advocacy, Education
- Location(s): Helsinki, Finland KP20kf
- Region served: Finland
- Members: 3,500
- Official language: Finnish
- President: Timo Rinne OH5LLR (ad interim)
- Affiliations: International Amateur Radio Union, Nordic Radio Amateur Union
- Website: http://www.sral.fi/

The Suomen Radioamatööriliitto (SRAL) (in English, Finnish Amateur Radio League) is a national nonprofit organization for amateur radio enthusiasts in Finland. SRAL was founded in 1921 and has approximately 3,500 members. SRAL supports amateur radio operators in Finland by sponsoring amateur radio operating awards and radio contests. SRAL was one of the sponsor organizations for the 2002 World Radiosport Team Championships held near Helsinki. The SRAL also represents the interests of Finnish amateur radio operators and shortwave listeners before Finnish and international telecommunications regulatory authorities. SRAL is the national member society representing Finland in both Nordic Radio Amateur Union and International Amateur Radio Union.

== See also ==
- International Amateur Radio Union
- Nordic Radio Amateur Union
