= The Alps-Adriatic Working Group =

Organization

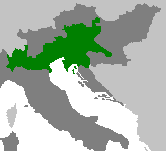
- Formation: 20 November 1978
- Type: International organization
- Headquarters: Klagenfurt, Carinthia (Austria)
- Members: 15: 1 state; 3 lands; 3 regions; 8 counties; Burgenland, Carinthia, Styria (Austria); Istria, Karlovac, Koprivnica-Križevci, Krapina-Zagorje, Međimurje, Varaždin, Virovitica-Podravina (Croatia); Vas (Hungary); Friuli-Venezia Giulia, Lombardy, Veneto (Italy); Slovenia
- Official language: Croatian; German; Hungarian; Italian; Slovene
- Leader: Peter Kaiser (Austria)
- Website: www.alps-adriatic-alliance.org

Working Community of Cantons, Provinces, Counties, Regions and Republics of East Alpine Region or The Alps-Adriatic Working Group (Croatian: Radna zajednica Alpe-Jadran; German: Arbeitsgemeinschaft Alpen-Adria; Hungarian: Alpok–Adria Munkaközösség; Italian: Comunità di lavoro Alpe Adria; Slovene: Delovna skupnost Alpe-Jadran) is an international organization that promotes co-operation between the states of the Eastern Alps and the Northern Adriatic region in the field of tourism, environmental protection, culture, science, politics, economy and European integration. The initiative to establish the group came from Italy and the body was founded in Venice in 1978. It initially served as a common forum for subnational units of Austria, Italy and Yugoslavia.

== Establishment ==
The Alps-Adriatic Working Group was established on November 20, 1978 in Venice with the signature of the Joint Declaration of regional Prime Ministers. The association has no legal personality. Area in which The Group acts has 190,423 square kilometers, and a population of approximately 30 million people.

== Bodies ==
Bodies of AAWC are:

1. Plenary Assembly of Prime Ministers of the members - they meet once a year, usually in November, to evaluate the activities conducted, determine the main tasks for the coming period, accept joint documents, conclusions and declarations

2. Executive Committee - the main executive body that includes permanent representatives and decides on the current activities and initiate individual actions, debate and decide on the proposals coming from commissions, and coordinate the activities of working and project groups. They also decide on the financial support for projects and on sponsorships. They make the preparations for the Plenary Assembly, including the proposed conclusions

3. Presidency -responsible for preparing the meetings of the Executive Committee. It consists of representatives of the former, current and future presidencies. They meet 1 to 3 weeks prior to a meeting of the Executive Committee. They assist the Executive Committee in the implementation of its responsibilities towards the Plenary Assembly -every two years, one member assumes the presidency, working committees and the Secretariat. They rotate in alphabetical order.

4. Expert and project groups- established at the request of one or more members with a view to implementing particular projects

Secretariat is located at Klagenfurt. It deals with the administration, organisation and coordination.

== Goals and areas of cooperation ==
Its main goals are:

1. jointly discussing and coordinating issues that are in the interest of the members
2. developing cooperation and exchange in the Alps-Adriatic area
3. strengthening the Central European cultural identity
4. inclusion in the processes of European cooperation and integration
5. support for the admission of candidate states from the area of the AAWC to the EU, and nomination of joint projects for co-financing from EU assistance programs

== Members ==
The organization currently has 15 regular members that come from 4 countries of the Alps-Adriatic region, Austria, Croatia, Hungary and Slovenia. There are also 3 associate members, Club Tre Popoli, Sanicademia-International Training Academy for health professionals and Slovenska gospodarska zveza v Celovcu.
