= Experimenterende Danske Radioamatører =

Experimenterende Danske Radioamatører Danish Amateur Radio Experimenters
- Abbreviation: EDR
- Formation: August 15, 1927
- Type: Non-profit organization
- Purpose: Advocacy, Education
- Location(s): Odense, Denmark; JO55ej
- Region served: Denmark
- Official language: Danish
- President: Arne Fast Hansen OZ4VW
- Affiliations: International Amateur Radio Union
- Website: http://www.edr.dk/

The Experimenterende Danske Radioamatører (EDR) (in English, Danish Amateur Radio Experimenters) is a national non-profit organization for amateur radio enthusiasts in Denmark. Membership benefits of EDR include the sponsorship of amateur radio operating awards and radio contests, and a QSL bureau for those members who communicate with amateur radio operators in other countries.

EDR represents the interests of Danish amateur radio operators before Danish and international telecommunications regulatory authorities. EDR is the national member society representing Denmark in the International Amateur Radio Union.

EDR publishes a membership magazine called OZ.

== See also ==
- International Amateur Radio Union
