= Íslenskir Radíóamatörar =

Icelandic amateur radio organization

Íslenskir Radíóamatörar Icelandic Radio Amateurs
- Abbreviation: ÍRA
- Formation: August 14, 1946
- Type: Non-profit organization
- Purpose: Advocacy, Education
- Location(s): Reykjavík, Iceland HP94ad
- Region served: Iceland
- Official language: Icelandic
- President: Jón Þóroddur Jónsson, TF3JA
- Affiliations: International Amateur Radio Union
- Website: http://www.ira.is/

The Íslenskir Radíóamatörar, ÍRA, in English, Icelandic Radio Amateurs is a national non-profit organization for amateur radio enthusiasts in Iceland. Key membership benefits of the IRA include the sponsorship of amateur radio operating awards and radio contests, and a QSL bureau for those members who regularly communicate with amateur radio operators in other countries. IRA represents the interests of Icelandic amateur radio operators before Icelandic and international telecommunications regulatory authorities. IRA publishes a monthly membership magazine called CQ TF. IRA is the national member society representing Iceland in the International Amateur Radio Union.

== See also ==
- International Amateur Radio Union
