= Radio Emergency Associated Communication Teams =

Volunteer radio emergency service

REACT (Radio Emergency Associated Communication Teams) is a CB radio Emergency Channel 9 monitoring organizations across the United States, Canada and worldwide, established in 1962. The primary role of REACT volunteers was to stand and watch on CB Emergency Channel 9 to help motorists. Later, duties grew to include radio communications after disasters (e.g., tornadoes and floods), and before disasters (storm spotting). REACT safety communications for parades, runs/walks, and other community events also became prominent. REACT Teams have added amateur, FRS, GMRS, Multi-Use Radio Service (MURS), Trunked radio systems, and business band radio (LMR) to their public service capabilities.

== Services provided ==
Each REACT Team functions within a limited locale.

Many REACT Teams utilize their radio communications to provide services such as parking control, search and rescue support, assistance with large public events, safety breaks along highways, and support of local emergency management offices and law enforcement. Some Teams participate in the Skywarn program of storm spotters. All of these roles require the radio communications that REACT Teams offer.

== Objectives ==
- (a) To develop the use of personal radio services as an additional source of communications for emergencies, disasters, and as an emergency aid to individuals;
- (b) To establish 24-hour volunteer monitoring of emergency calls, particularly over officially designated emergency frequencies, from personal radio service operators, and report such calls to appropriate emergency authorities;
- (c) To promote transportation safety by developing programs that provide information and communications assistance to motorists;
- (d) To coordinate efforts with, and provide communications support to, other groups, (e.g., Red Cross, Emergency Management, local, state, and federal authorities,) during emergencies and disasters;
- (e) To develop, administer, and promote public information projects demonstrating and publicizing the potential benefits and the proper use of the personal radio service to individuals, organizations, industry, and government;
- (f) To participate in citizen crime prevention programs were established by law enforcement agencies.

== History ==
1962: A sick infant, a disabled car on a Chicago freeway, and a January blizzard prompted Henry B. (Pete) Kreer to envision using CB radio to get help in such emergencies. Hallicrafters Radio sponsored the founding of REACT in April, with Kreer serving as its executive director.

1967: REACT approached the FCC for a designated CB Emergency Channel.

1969: REACT gained General Motors Research Labs as its new sponsor.

1970: CB-9 was designated the 'Emergency and Travelers' Assistance Channel' by the FCC. The Ohio REACT Network was created. It worked with the Ohio State Highway Patrol to demonstrate how CB-9 could enhance highway safety. It later became the first REACT Council. REACT signed its first MOU (Memorandum of Understanding) with the American Red Cross.

1973: REACT's Pete Kreer and Jerry Reese were interviewed on the NBC 'Today' show about the potential of CB radio in highway safety.

1975: REACT became an Illinois not-for-profit corporation.

1976: REACT held its first convention in Deerfield, IL. REACT participated in the White House Conference on CB Radio.

1977: REACT launched its highway 'Safety Break' program in cooperation with the American Trucking Associations. REACT developed the NEAR (National Emergency Aid Radio) safety program for the U.S. government.

1978: REACT signed an MOU with Special Olympics.

1982: REACT was honored with the first U.S. President's Volunteer Action Award.

1984: REACT assisted in introducing FRS (Family Radio Service).

1985: REACT office moved from Chicago, IL to Wichita, KS.

1986: 'REACT Month' was observed for the first time.

1988: REACT developed its 'Team Topics' newsletter for Teams. REACT introduced its CB-9 road sign to advise travelers of monitoring.

1991: REACT published the first in a series of 'Team Training Modules' to advance its monitors' skills.

1993: REACT signed MOUs with the American Red Cross, Salvation Army, and National Weather Service.

1994: REACT, at HamCom in Arlington, TX, hosted remote operation of ARRL flagship station W1AW.

1995: REACT HQ established its first website. Rose City, Windsor, and Ontario REACTs launched the first REACT Team website. Several REACT Teams responded to the bombing of the Alfred P Murrah Building (Oklahoma City).

1998: REACT moved its headquarters from Wichita, KS to Suitland, MD. REACT Teams in Florida that responded to wildfires received recognition from the governor.

2001: Several REACT Teams assisted Salvation Army for a week after the World Trade Center attack in New York City. REACT signed an MOU with the American Radio Relay League (ARRL).

2002: REACT assisted with the Olympic Torch Run. REACT presented its first "Radio Hero Award" to an Indiana State Trooper.

2004: REACT again hosted ARRL station W1AW, at HamCom in Arlington, TX.

2005: REACT and Popular Communications magazine began a bi-monthly news column to report Team activity.

2008: REACT presented the second Radio Hero Award to a 9-year-old WA boy.

2010: REACT moved its headquarters from Suitland, MD to Dinwiddie, VA. REACT joined GERC - Global Emergency Radio Coalition - as a Charter Member. REACT presented its third Radio Hero Award to a U.S. airman.

2011: REACT released its 50th Anniversary Logo. REACT Teams responded to Hurricane Irene and Tropical Storm Lee.

2012: REACT office returned to Chicago; administration moved to Glendale, CA.

2022: REACT celebrated its 60th anniversary.

2023: REACT launched an update to its heritage triangle logo for optional use by Teams.
