= South Jersey Radio Association =

South Jersey Radio Association (SJRA) is an amateur radio organization. First organized June 12, 1916 and affiliated with the American Radio Relay League since 1920, SJRA lays claim to be the oldest continuously operating amateur radio club in the United States. SJRA operates the K2AA 2 Meter communications Repeater on 145.290 MHz, which is located in Medford, New Jersey and covers the Philadelphia metropolitan area.

SJRA also operates the K2UK Repeater in Pine Hill, New Jersey on 146.865 mHz 2 meters and 442.350 mHz 70 cm Band. For over 50 years, SJRA has published a monthly newsletter, Harmonics. SJRA has been affiliated with the American Radio Relay League since 1920.

== Awards ==
SJRA offers two awards to the general amateur radio community.

=== VHF Colonial Award ===
The VHF Colonial award is to operators who provide proof of a two way direct contact with each of the original Thirteen Colonies over amateur radio on frequencies of 50 MHz or above.

=== South Jersey Radio Association Achievement Certificate ===
The South Jersey Radio Association Achievement Certificate is given to amateur radio operators who provide proof of a two way contact with at least 50 of the SJRA's members.
