= Norsk Radio Relæ Liga =

Norwegian amateur radio organization

Norsk Radio Relæ Liga Norwegian Radio Relay League
- Abbreviation: NRRL
- Formation: 8 August 1928
- Type: Non-profit organization
- Purpose: Advocacy, Education
- Headquarters: Oslo, Norway; JO59kx
- Region served: Norway
- Official language: Norwegian
- President: LA3PNA, Thomas Snare Knutsen
- General Secretary: LB7ZG, Bjørn Myrvold
- Affiliations: International Amateur Radio Union, Nordic Radio Amateur Union
- Website: http://www.nrrl.no/

The Norsk Radio Relæ Liga (NRRL) (in English, Norwegian Radio Relay League) is a national non-profit organization for amateur radio enthusiasts in Norway. Key membership benefits of NRRL include the sponsorship of amateur radio operating awards and radio contests, and a QSL bureau for those members who regularly communicate with amateur radio operators in other countries. NRRL publishes a membership magazine called Amatørradio. NRRL represents the interests of Norwegian amateur radio operators before Norwegian and international telecommunications regulatory authorities. NRRL is the national member society representing Norway in the International Amateur Radio Union.

== See also ==
- International Amateur Radio Union
