= Alberta Adolescent Recovery Centre =

Canadian drug rehabilitation centre

- Operates in Canada
- Abbreviation: AARC
- Formation: 1992
- Purpose: Drug Rehabilitation
- Region served: Alberta, Canada
- President: F. Dean Vause
- Website: Alberta Adolescent Recovery Centre

The Alberta Adolescent Recovery Centre, or AARC, is a drug rehabilitation centre for adolescents and family members located in Calgary, Alberta. AARC specializes in treating young people suffering from drug addiction and alcoholism, and takes in clients who have been thought of as being too far-gone for recovery. The AARC program is a multifaceted drug treatment program that uses twelve-step recovery processes, peer counseling, family and group therapy. A survey conducted by AARC found they had an 80% success rate, and that former addicts can permanently abstain from using drugs or alcohol following treatment at the centre. Another study found that the "AARC program is a unique model for comprehensive, long-term adolescent substance use treatment with a high rate of treatment completion (80.5%)."

AARC is licensed as a Residential Addiction Treatment Service Provider under the Mental Health Services Protection Act in the Province of Alberta. AARC uses an external accreditation service to give an independent evaluation of its governance, practices and outcomes and has a contract with Canadian Accreditation Council of Human Services (CAC).

== History ==
AARC was established in Calgary, Alberta in 1991. AARC was originally funded through a collaborative effort between the Rotary Club and the Alberta government, recognizing the need for a long-term youth treatment centre in Alberta. The AARC program (formerly called KIDS of The Canadian West) was modeled off of the KIDS Of North Jersey program, which shut down in 1998 after losing state funding due to abuse allegations and tax fraud. Vause was initially employed as the executive director, and was directly overseen by the board of directors, who are a collection of business leaders and professionals from the Calgary community.

Dean Vause worked at KIDS with Miller Newton for a period of time before being hired by Miller Newton in 1989 to set up a Canadian branch of KIDS to be called KIDS Of The Canadian West. A gala was held at the grand opening of Banker's Hall to raise funds for KWC, which would later change its name due to the now negative association with Miller Newton (incidentally KIDS of North Jersey would be shut down just a month after this gala was held). Vause abandoned the KIDS title and quietly implemented the very tactics that the Department of Human Services requested KIDS change before ultimately shutting that program down.

Peer counselors are debated to be effective in the treatment of mental health disorders in the following ways: They provide a positive role model for clients to identify with, they provide an example of hope that recovery is possible, they are able to use their personal experience to help others suffering from the same mental illness. They help bridge the gap between clinical staff and clients. Opponents of peer counseling warn that poorly supervised or designed programs can have harmful- or even fatal results. The government of Alberta has no regulatory college to ensure those who call themselves "addictions counselors" and "therapists" are qualified to be in such positions.

Family Therapy has been found to be effective in the treatment of drug and alcohol addiction and has been correlated with higher success rates for those suffering from addiction, particularly adolescents.

Since AARC's inception in 1991, it has treated over 680 addicted adolescents and their families. AARC has also grown professionally over the last 20 years. AARC currently employs a number of graduates of the program as clinical staff who have received various educations in the fields of addiction and mental health, two nurses, and regularly consulting psychiatrists and psychologists.

Donny Serink is the current Executive Director and is a Registered Social Worker (RSW). Donny holds a Bachelor of Social Work (BSW) degree and a Bachelor of Communication and Culture (BCC) degree, with a minor in Philosophy, both from the University of Calgary. He also holds an Addiction Studies Extension Certificate from Mount Royal University. Donny is continuing his education as a graduate student in the Master of Social Work program at the University of Waterloo. Donny’s personal story of addiction and recovery, along with his education, provide him with the tools to positively influence the lives of AARC adolescents and their families.

== Program ==
Treatment in AARC is based on the 12 steps of Alcoholics Anonymous.

The theory of alcoholism and drug addiction as a disease is the basis for the program.

Treatment involves the use of peer counselors (graduates of this program) and highly trained clinical counselors most of whom themselves have also faced addiction or seen the results first hand as family members of the addicted. It is said that it is hard to pull the wool over the eyes of one who has seen, done and share what you have done and are doing. Using those who have experienced addiction first hand allows a deeper connection and more help. At AARC, peer counsellors must be 18 years or older and actively involved in their own recovery, with a minimum two years of sobriety. The peer counsellors receive 57 hours of training annually (in line with CAC standards) and are supervised by AARC clinical staff. Peer counselors also provide feedback regarding their observations and interactions with the clients to AARC’s clinical team at weekly staff meetings.

In addition, the family members are offered counseling. Many individuals are opposed to this as they do not see how having an addict as a child affects them and their lives. The counseling and "rap" sessions provided to family members involves the family members learning and delving into their selves to discover how the lies, deceits and many other symptoms have affected their lives and views. How behaviors have been learned that enable the addict to continue using. i.e. giving in rather than confronting, the denials and desperate desires to believe the lies that this will be the last time even if it is the 5th or 10th circle in this cycle.

For those who are willing and accept it, the counseling offered helps rebuild family relations, and helps individuals improve upon themselves.

== Controversy ==
In 2007, Andrew Evans, a graduate and former counselor of the AARC's treatment program, who was no longer working at AARC at the time, relapsed on drugs and alcohol and murdered 33-year-old Nicole Parisien in Vancouver, BC. Evans beat and tortured her to death, disposing of her and evidence in a rolled up rug. Allegedly, Evans flew into a 'blind rage' after being unable to achieve erection. Evans was found guilty of second-degree murder and sentenced to life in prison with no chance of parole for ten years, but was released after seven years.

After his release, AARC hired Evans as a quality assurance co-ordinator. In February 2019, Evans was scheduled to speak at a teacher's convention in Calgary on behalf of the AARC, but the session was cancelled after a complaint from an Alberta educator. Evans left his position at AARC in 2019 and no longer works there.

In February 2009, AARC became the subject of controversy when former patients made allegations of abuse. On February 13, the CBC newsmagazine the fifth estate aired an investigative report called "Powerless", in which former patients and staff at AARC alleged mistreatment of patients. Vause denied the allegations. In 2009, AARC opened a legal case against the CBC, several CBC reporters, and four ex-patients.

In 2021, the litigation against the CBC was settled to the satisfaction of AARC and the CBC and there was no admission of liability by the CBC.

== See also ==
- Community Alliance for the Ethical Treatment of Youth
