= Estonian Radio Amateurs' Union =

Organization based in Estonia

Eesti Raadioamatööride Ühing Estonian Radio Amateurs Union
- Abbreviation: ERAU, ERAÜ
- Formation: March 1, 1935
- Type: Non-profit organization
- Purpose: Advocacy, Education
- Location(s): Tallinn, Estonia; KO29jk
- Region served: Estonia
- Members: 360
- Official language: Estonian
- Chairman: Kristjan Kass, ES7GM
- Affiliations: International Amateur Radio Union
- Website: http://www.erau.ee/

The Eesti Raadioamatööride Ühing (ERAU) (in English, Estonian Radio Amateurs Union) is a national non-profit organization for amateur radio enthusiasts in Estonia. Key membership benefits of ERAU include the sponsorship of amateur radio operating awards and radio contests, and a QSL bureau for those members who regularly communicate with amateur radio operators in other countries. ERAU publishes a semi-annual membership magazine called ES-QTC. ERAU represents the interests of Estonian amateur radio operators before Estonian and international telecommunications regulatory authorities. ERAU is the national member society representing Estonia in the International Amateur Radio Union.

== See also ==
- International Amateur Radio Union
