= Luxembourg Amateur Radio Union =

- Abbreviation: LARU
- Type: Non-profit organization
- Purpose: Science, Education
- Location(s): Luxembourg; JN39bo
- Region served: Luxembourg
- Official language: Luxembourgish, French, German, English
- Website: http://www.laru.lu/

The Luxembourg Amateur Radio Union (LARU) (in German, Luxemburger Amateur Radio Union, in French, Union des Radioamateurs du Luxembourg) is a national non-profit organization for amateur radio enthusiasts in Luxembourg . The LARU was founded on January 1, 2014. The LARU promotes technical progress and cohesion of amateur radio operators. The LARU sets priorities in emergency communications, digital voice communications, digital data transmission, science and education.

The LARU offers workshops dedicated to amateur radio, offers a radio course for the preparation of the amateur radio exam (HAREC and NOVICE), organises fielddays and ham-meetings, operates voice repeaters, APRS digipeaters, servers and gateways, activates special callsigns. The organization operates webpages dedicated to emergency communications and DMR an open digital radio standard for professional mobile radio used in amateur radio . The amateur radio club callsign of the LARU is LX9LARU. The LARU also uses the call LX4E for emergency operations and other special activities.

The LARU also operates the LARU LX QSL Bureau. Herewith the LARU supports amateur radio operators in Luxembourg and in the world by promoting the exchange of QSL cards.

Although the LARU is a national amateur radio organization representing the interests of amateur radio operators in Luxembourg, it is not a member of the IARU.

== Amateur radio repeaters operated by the LARU ==
As of 2019 the LARU operates 6 DMR repeaters and 2 APRS repeaters.

Callsign	Locator	QTH	Frequency	Shift	Mode
LX0E			439.8000 / 439.9125 / 439.92500 MHz	-9.4 MHz	DMR
LX0BER	JN29XW	Nocher	438.9875 MHz	-7.6 MHz	DMR
LX0DMR	JN39BP	Luxembourg	438.2875 MHz	-7.6 MHz	DMR
LX0DMX	JN29WM	Differdange	438.4750 MHz	-7.6 MHz	DMR
LX0FSK	-	-	438.8875 MHz	-7.6 MHz	DMR
LX0NSR	JN39BU	Ettelbrück	438.6875 MHz	-7.6 MHz	DMR
LX0APD	JN39bu	Diekirch	144.8 / 432.5 MHz	simplex	APRS
LX0SCI	JN29wm	Differdange	144.8 / 432.5 MHz	simplex	APRS
