= Product cannibalization =

Product cannibalization may refer to:

- Market cannibalism
- Cannibalization (marketing)
