= Junk box =

Term describing a spare parts box

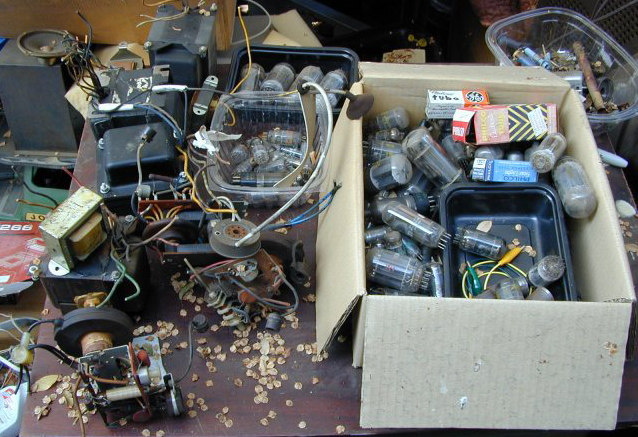
Portion of amateur station KF6PQT's "Junk Box"

Junk box is a term used by amateur radio operators (hams) to describe a collection of spare parts and old equipment kept to assist in building and repairing their station. Typical items found in a junk box are electronic components such as resistors and capacitors as well as small parts such as screws, nuts and bolts. A junk box may also contain surplus, cast off or used electronic gear. Radio amateurs who construct their own equipment, known as homebrewers, often have large or well stocked junk boxes.

== Description and uses ==
According to some hams, a well-stocked junk box is a requirement for anyone who likes to build, repair, or tinker with radio equipment and electronic gear. Keeping an ample supply of spare electronic components provides the ham with parts to build a variety of electronic projects, as well as "spares" of components needed for repairs. Resistors, capacitors, transistors, meters, speakers, wire, cable, and even small mechanical parts such as screws, nuts and bolts are typical junk box items. Cannibalizing or removing parts from old equipment is sometimes the only way for an individual to obtain some types of parts, either because they are no longer made, or can only be ordered in large quantities. Cast-off or used electronic equipment makes especially good additions to a junk box. What non-hams may see as junk, hams often see as treasure. Hamfests, surplus stores, electronic swapmeets and even dumpster diving are often venues for hams to trade, buy, scrounge, or salvage spare parts and components. Junk boxes can range in size from small cardboard or plastic boxes, to large collections that fill garages and outbuildings. Many hams derive satisfaction from having an especially large junk box full of exotic and hard-to-find components. Others feel that the act of tracking down parts is half the fun.

== Use in homebrewing ==
Homebrewing is a slang term in amateur radio referring to building an alternative to a commercially available piece of equipment or accessory by hand. "Homebrewers" often naturally maintain a sizeable junk box, and amateur radio publications have often employed the term in DIY project articles such as "The 'Junker' Amplifier" from QST, Oct 1970, an RF amplifier built from scrounged and junk-box parts.

== See also ==
- Boat anchor (computer science)
- Circuit bending
- QRP
- Vintage amateur radio
