= QRP operation =

Low-power amateur radio

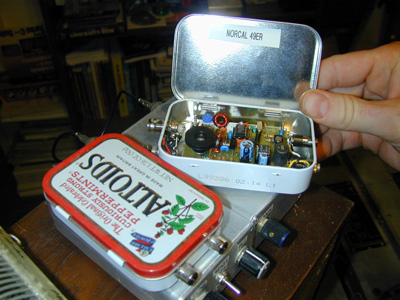
A homebrew QRP low-power transmitter and receiver that fits inside an Altoids tin.

In amateur radio, QRP operation refers to transmitting at reduced power while attempting to maximize a station's effective range. QRP operation is a specialized pursuit within the hobby that was first popularized in the early 1920s. QRP operators tend to limit their transmitted RF power to 5 W or less, although some also consider single-sideband (SSB) operations of up to 10 W to be QRP.

Reliable two-way communication at such low power levels can be challenging due to changing radio propagation and the difficulty of receiving the relatively weak transmitted signals. QRP enthusiasts may employ optimized antenna systems, enhanced operating skills, and a variety of special modes, in order to maximize their ability to make and maintain radio contact. Since the late 1960s, commercial transceivers specially designed for QRP operation have evolved from vacuum tube to solid state technology.

A number of organizations dedicated to QRP operation exist, and aficionados participate in various contests designed to test their skill in making long-distance contacts at low power levels.

== Etymology ==
The term "QRP" derives from the standard Q code used in radio communication, where QRP is used to request "Reduce power" and QRP? is used to ask "Should I reduce power?". (Note: The opposite of QRP is QRO, or increased power operation.)

== Philosophy ==
Most amateur transceivers are capable of transmitting a signal at approximately 100 watts, but in some parts of the world, such as the U.S., amateurs can transmit at power levels up to 1,500 watts. QRP enthusiasts contend that this practice is rarely necessary, and doing so wastes power, increases the likelihood of causing interference to nearby televisions, radios, and telephones and, for United States' amateurs, is contrary to FCC Part 97 rule, which states that one must use "the minimum power necessary to carry out the desired communications". QRP can also be used for emergency communications during disaster recovery, when frugal use of available battery power and generator fuel is crucial.

== Practice ==
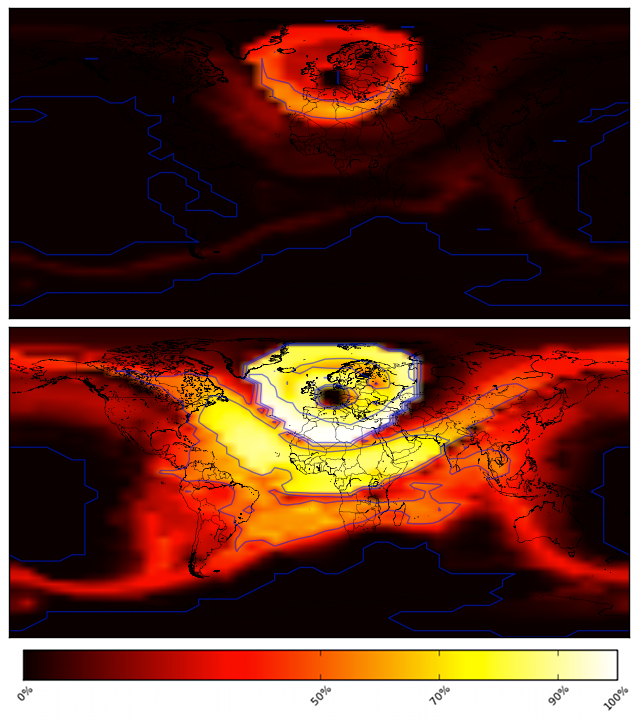
VOACAP simulation of propagation against distance, comparing effective radiations of 1 watt (top) and 99 watts (bottom).

The practice of operating with low power was popularized as early as 1924, with a variety of reports, editorials and articles published in U.S. amateur radio magazines and journals that encouraged amateurs to lower power output, both for purposes of experimentation, and for improving operating conditions by reducing interference.

Although not universally agreed upon, the ARRL makes a recommendation for QRP power limits. Most amateur organizations agree that for CW, AM, FM, and data modes, the transmitter output power should be 5 watts (or less). The maximum output power for SSB (single sideband) is sometimes agreed to be no more than 10 Watts peak envelope power (PEP), while some organisations opine that the power limit should be 5 Watts. QRPers are known to regularly use less than 5 Watts, sometimes operating with as little as 100 milliwatts or even less. Extremely low power — 1 Watt and below — is often referred to by hobbyists as "QRPP".

Communicating using QRP can be difficult since the QRPer must face the same challenges of radio propagation faced by amateurs using higher power levels, but with the inherent disadvantages associated with having a weaker signal on the receiving end, all other things being equal. QRP aficionados try to make up for this through more efficient antenna systems and enhanced operating skills.

=== Weak signal modes ===
QRP enthusiasts may use special modes that employ technology and software designed to enhance reception of the relatively weak transmitted signals resulting from low power levels.

QRSS: Very slow speed Morse code

QRSS uses very slow speed CW (Morse code) to compensate for the decreased signal-to-noise ratio involved in QRP operation. (Note: QRSS is an exaggerated version of QRS, the standard Q code used in radio communications. "QRS?" asks "Shall I send more slowly?".) QRSS enthusiasts may record a transmission for later analysis, sometimes decoding "by ear" while playing it back at much faster speeds, or decoding "by eye" on the waterfall display of a spectrum analyzer.

Coherent CW: Critically-timed Morse code transmission

Coherent CW uses transmitters that clock-out signals calibrated to a precise rate, allowing receivers to employ extremely narrowband filtering to increase readability.

WSJT: Weak Signal – Joe Taylor

WSJT is a software system that utilizes several separate modes, each optimized for a different signal path; these include meteor scatter, troposcatter, and EME communications. WSJT was named after Dr. J.H. Taylor to acknowledge his work in developing weak signal communication modes for radio. (Note: Dr. Joseph Hooton Taylor Jr. is an astrophysicist who won the Nobel Prize in Physics in 1993 for discovery of a new type of pulsar which is useful for the study of General Relativity by radio astronomy. He is an amateur radio operator (currently K1JT), and has generously contributed his technical expertise to the development of successful transmission of weak signals over otherwise rarely usable propagation paths.)

WSPR: Weak Signal – Propagation Reporter

WSPR is a software suite and computer network used to monitor propagation paths for optimal communication conditions.

== Equipment ==
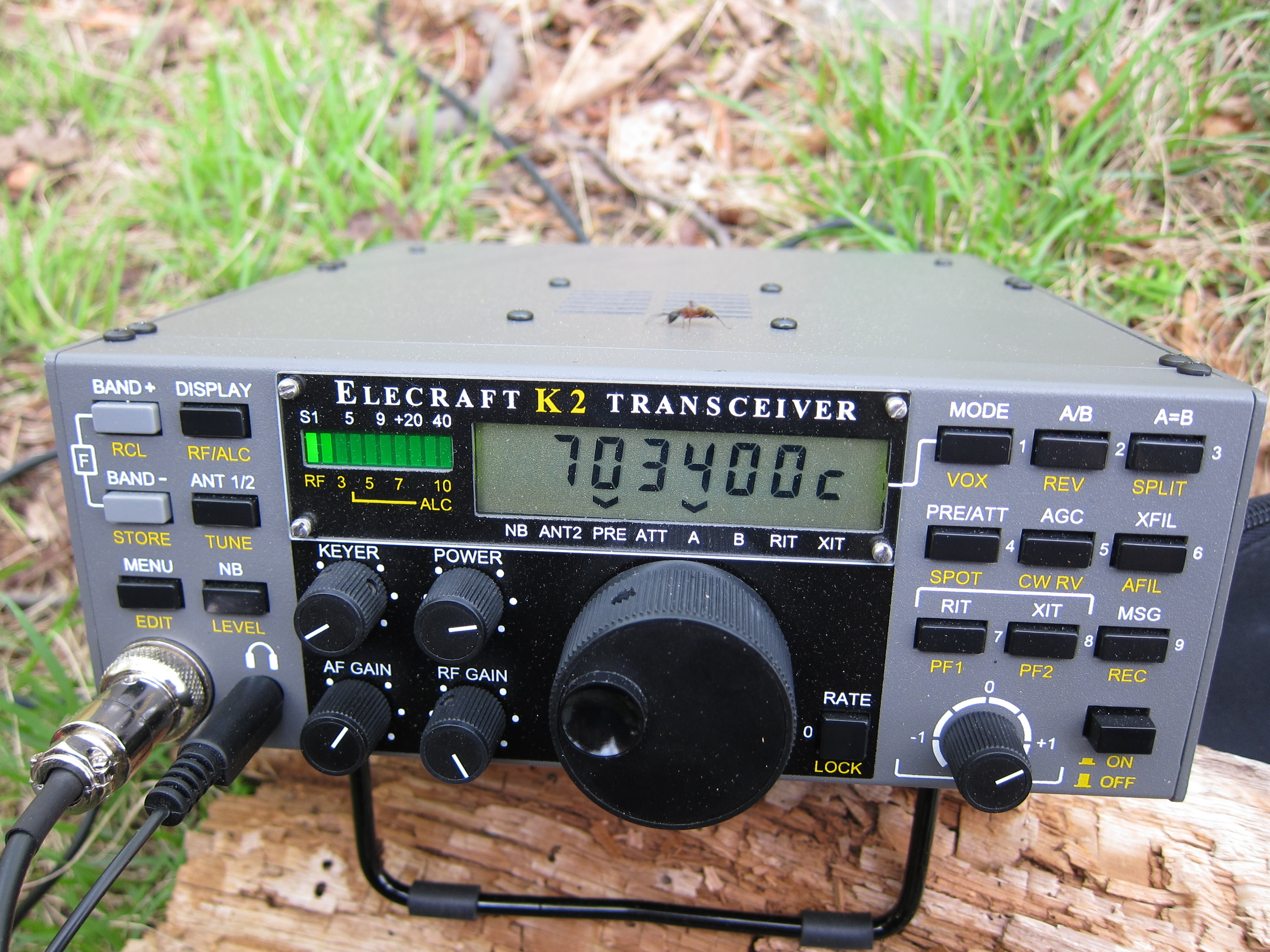
Example of transceiver optimized for QRP CW operation: Elecraft K2

Many of the larger, more powerful commercial transceivers permit the operator to lower their output level to QRP levels. Commercial transceivers specially designed to operate at or near QRP power levels have been commercially available since the late 1960s.

In 1969 the American manufacturer Ten-Tec produced the Powermite-1, one of Ten-Tec's first assembled transceivers, which featured modular construction. All stages of the transceiver were on individual circuit boards: the transmitter was capable of about one or two watts of RF, and the receiver was a direct-conversion unit, similar to that found in the Heathkit HW-7 and HW-8 lines, which introduced many amateurs to QRP'ing and led to the popularity of the mode.

Enthusiasts operate QRP radios on the HF bands in portable modes, usually carrying the radios in backpacks, with whip antennas. Some QRPers prefer to construct their equipment from kits, published plans, or homebrew it from scratch. Many popular designs are based on the NE612 mixer IC, i.e. the K1, K2, ATS series and the Softrock SDR.

== Organizations ==
Amateur radio organizations dedicated to QRP include QRP Amateur Radio Club International (QRPARCI), American QRP Club, G-QRP Club based in the United Kingdom, and The Adventure Radio Society emphasizing portable QRP operation. Major QRP gatherings are held yearly at hamfests such as Dayton Hamvention, Pacificon, and Friedrichshafen.

== Contests and awards ==
There are specific operating awards, contests, clubs, and conventions devoted to QRP enthusiasts. In the United States, the November Sweepstakes, June and September VHF QSO Parties, January VHF Sweepstakes, and the ARRL International DX Contest, as well as many major international contests have designated special QRP categories. For example, during the annual ARRL's Field Day event, making a QSO (ham-to-ham contact) using "QRP battery power" is worth five times as many points as a contact made by conventional means. The QRP ARCI club sponsors 12 contests during the year specifically for QRP operators.

Typical awards include the QRP ARCI club's "thousand-miles-per-watt" award, available to anyone presenting evidence of a qualifying contact. QRP ARCI also offers special awards for achieving the ARRL's Worked All States, Worked All Continents, and DX Century Club awards under QRP conditions. Other QRP clubs also offer similar versions of these awards, as well as general QRP operating achievement awards.

== See also ==
- Amateur radio homebrew
- Paraset
- List of amateur radio QRP transceivers
