= Raag =

Raag may refer to:

- Raga, a melodic framework in Indian classical music
- Raag (film), a 2014 Assamese-language drama film
- Raag (surname)
- Radio Amateur Association of Greece
- Right-angled Artin groups, in geometric group theory
