= Radio shack =

Structure used for housing radio equipment

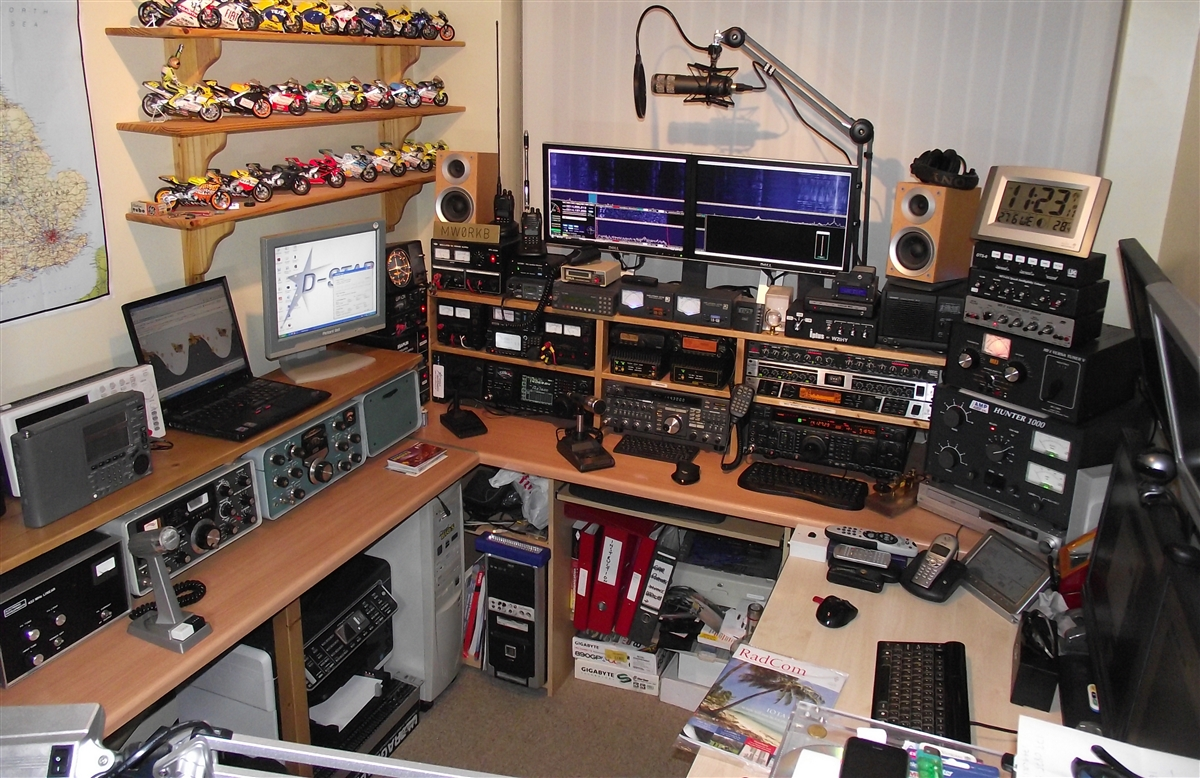
A typical amateur radio shack

A radio shack, also known as a ham shed, is a room or structure used for housing radio equipment.

== History ==
During radio's early days, equipment was experimental and often home-built. The first radio transmitters used a loud spark gap to generate radio waves, and so were often housed in a separate outbuilding or shed. When radio was first adopted by the U.S. Navy, a small wooden structure was placed on deck to house the ship's radio equipment, which became known as the "radio shack".

Today, a radio shack can be any place where radio equipment is housed and operated. For some amateur radio operators, the entire "shack" may consist of a hand-held radio or two, while others may use mobile equipment in a vehicle. In amateur radio, the room housing the equipment is also often called a "ham shack".

In 1921, Theodore and Milton Deutschmann, aiming to appeal to radio professionals and enthusiasts, chose the name "Radio Shack" for their Boston, Massachusetts, radio parts retail and mail-order business, which eventually grew to a chain of thousands of stores at its peak.
