= Amateur radio homebrew =

Amateur radio home-built equipment

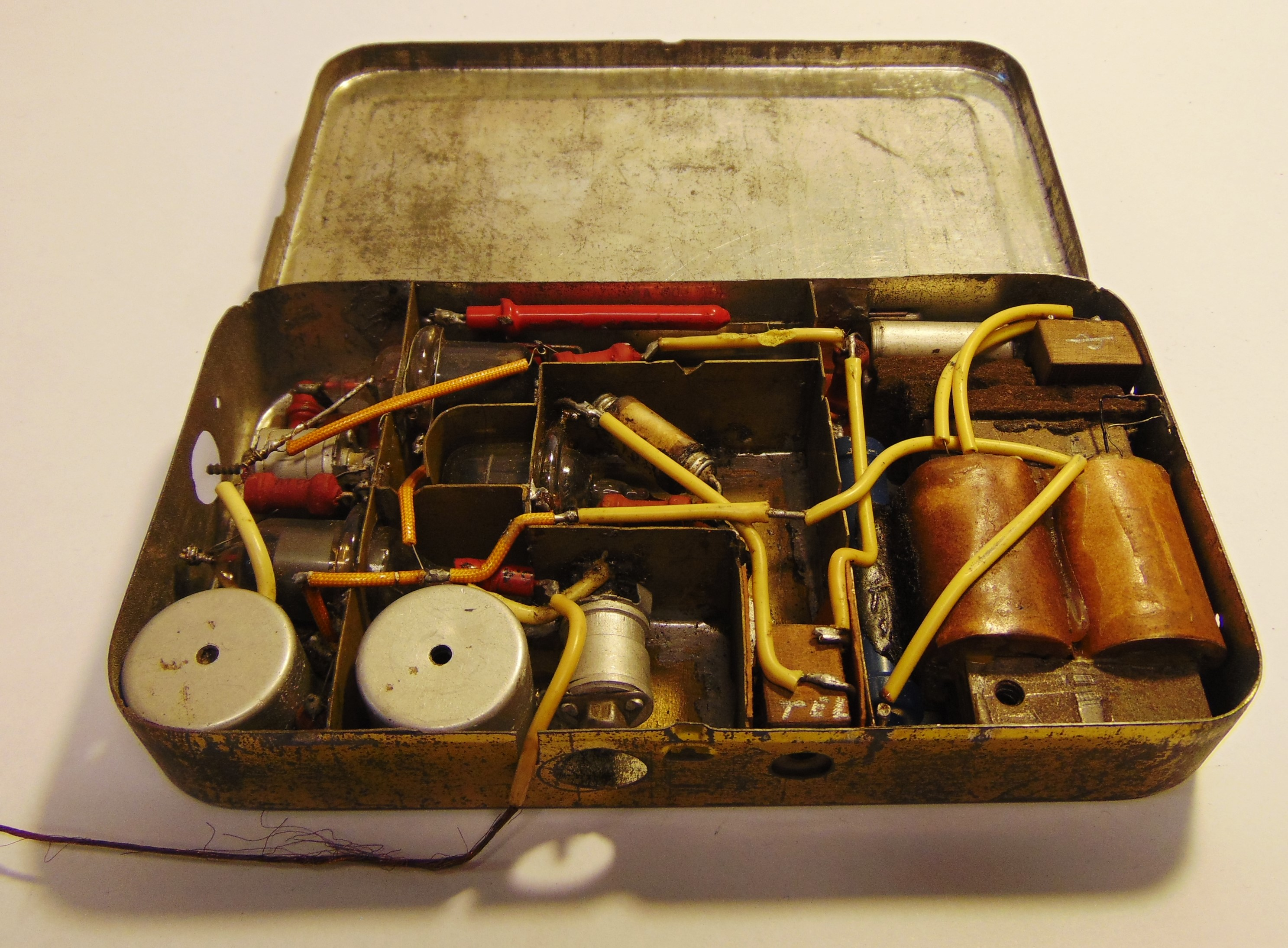
Improvised radio from WW2

Homebrew is an amateur radio slang term for home-built, noncommercial radio equipment. Design and construction of equipment from first principles is valued by amateur radio hobbyists, known as "hams", for educational value, and to allow experimentation and development of techniques or levels of performance not readily available as commercial products. Some items can be home-brewed at similar or lower cost than purchased equivalents.

== History ==
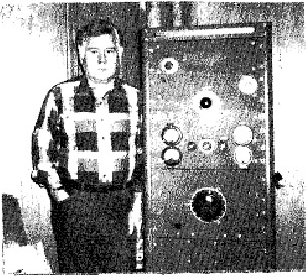
Early "homebrew" amateur radio transmitter

In the early years of amateur radio, long before factory-built gear was easily available, hams built their own transmitting and receiving equipment, known as homebrewing. In the 1930s, 40s, and 50s, hams handcrafted reasonable-quality vacuum tube-based transmitters and receivers which were often housed in their basements, and it was common for a well-built "homebrew rig" to cover all the high frequency bands (1.8 to 30 MHz). After WWII ended, surplus material (transmitters/receivers, etc.), was readily available, providing previously unavailable material at costs low enough for amateur experimental use.

Homebrewing was often encouraged by amateur radio publications. In 1950, CQ Amateur Radio Magazine announced a ‘‘$1000 Cash Prize ‘Home Brew’ Contest’’ and called independently-built equipment ‘‘the type of gear which has helped to make amateur radio our greatest reservoir of technical proficiency.’’ The magazine tried to steer hams back into building by sponsoring such competitions and by publishing more construction plans, saying that homebrewing imparted a powerful technical mastery to hams. In 1958, a CQ editorial opined that if ham radio lost status as a technical activity, it might also lose the privilege of operating on the public airwaves, saying, ‘‘As our ranks of home constructors thin we also fall to a lower technical level as a group’’.

In the 1950s and 60s, some hams turned to constructing their stations from kits sold by Heathkit, Eico, EF Johnson, Allied Radio's Knight-Kit, World Radio Laboratories and other suppliers.

Today, only a minority of hams own and operate completely homebrew or kit-built amateur stations. However, there are many new ham radio kit suppliers, and the "art" of homebrewing is alive and thriving.

== Practices ==
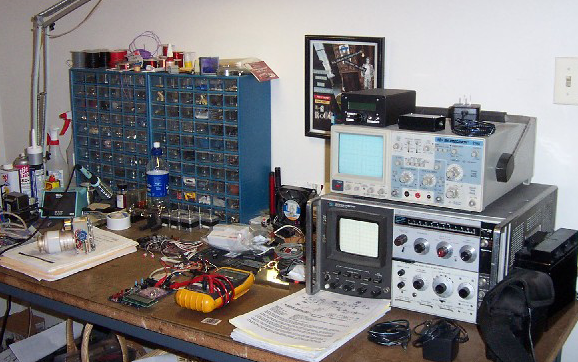
Workbench of "homebrew" enthusiast K6ESE

Homebrewing differs from kit-building in that "homebrew" connotes the process of constructing equipment using parts and designs gathered from varied and often improvised sources. Even the most skilled homebrewer may not have time or resources to build the equivalent of modern commercially made amateur radio gear from scratch, as the commercial units contain custom integrated circuits, custom cabinets, and are the result of multiple prototypes and exhaustive testing. However, constructing one's own equipment using relatively simple designs and easily obtainable or junk box electronic components is still possible. Homebrew enthusiasts say that building one's own radio equipment is fun and gives them the satisfaction that comes from mastering electronic knowledge.

== QRP homebrew ==
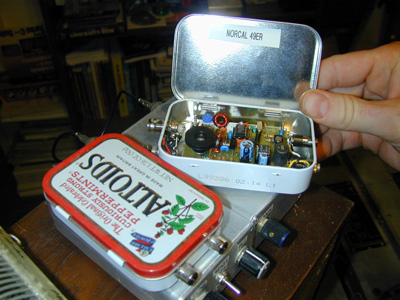
hand-built QRP transceiver

QRPers are ham radio enthusiasts known to use a power output of five watts, sometimes operating with as little as 100 milliwatts or even less. Extremely low power—one watt and below—is often referred to by hobbyists as QRPp. Commercial transceivers designed to operate at or near-QRP power levels have been available for many years, but some QRPers prefer to design and build their own equipment, either from kits or from scratch. Some have built miniature transmitters and transceivers into Altoids boxes and operate using battery power. Popular QRP kit models include the Elecraft K2, KX1, and now KX3 and those produced by NorCal, Small Wonder Labs, and others. QRP activity can often be heard on 7.030 MHz.

== Homebrewing with vacuum tubes ==
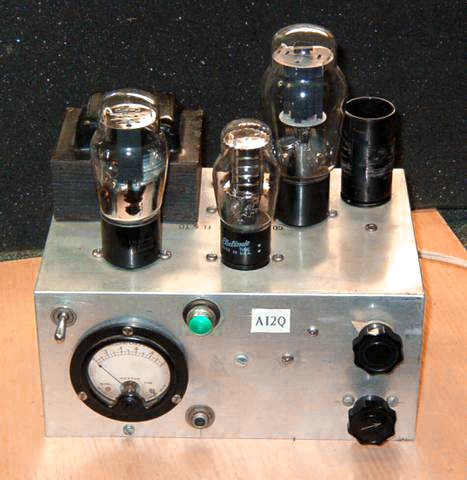
Glowbug transmitter hand built by AI2Q

"Glowbug" is a term used by US amateurs to describe a simple home-made tube-type radio set, reminiscent of the shortwave radio-building craze of the 1920s and 30s. Generally, any small, home-built tube-type transmitter or receiver may be referred to as a glowbug. The majority of glowbug transmitters are designed to be used in the CW radiotelegraphy mode. A number of radio amateurs also build their own tube receivers and AM voice transmitters.

As late as the 1960s, glowbugs were part of many beginner ham stations because of their simple, tube-based designs. Glowbugs are popular among QRP enthusiasts and others with a penchant for constructing their own equipment. Enthusiasts may assemble glowbugs on steel chassis, tin cakepans, and wooden boards. Glowbug enthusiasts can often be heard communicating on the shortwave bands via CW using Morse code. Simple oscillators for this frequency can be built with common NTSC color burst oscillator crystals, which operate at 3.5795 MHz.

== See also ==
- Amateur radio
- Boat anchor (computer science)
- Foxhole radio
- QRP
- Vintage amateur radio
