= Foxhole radio =

World War II makeshift radio

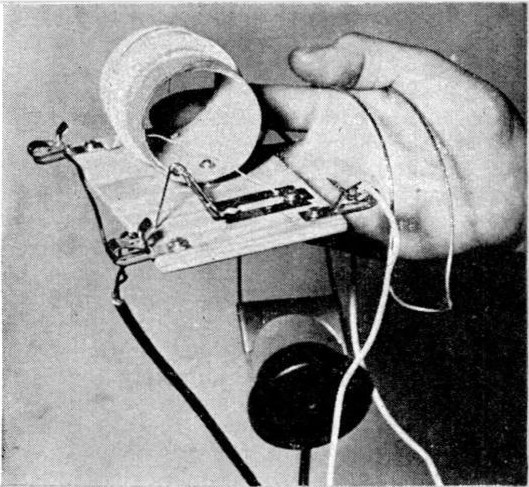
Closeup of foxhole radio, showing detector made of razor blade with pencil lead attached to safety pin pressing against it

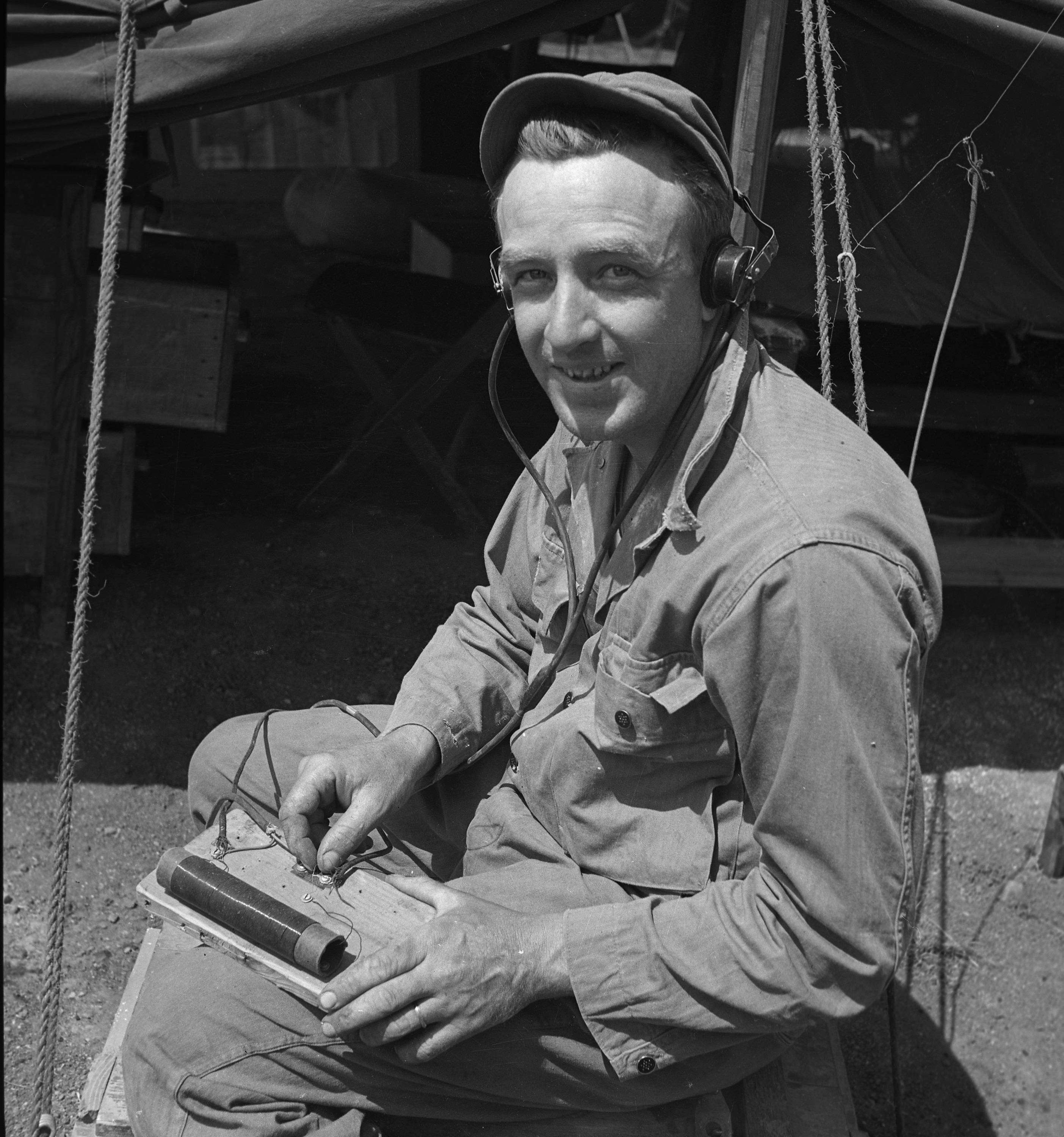
Soldier at the Anzio beachhead using foxhole radio

A foxhole radio is a makeshift radio that was built by soldiers in World War II for entertainment, to listen to local radio stations. Such radios were first reported at the Battle of Anzio, Italy; they later spread later across the European and Pacific theaters. The foxhole radio was a crude crystal radio, which used a safety-razor blade as a radio-wave detector with the blade acting as the crystal, and a wire, safety pin, or a graphite pencil-lead serving as the cat's whisker.

The foxhole radio, like a mineral-crystal radio receiver, had no power source other than that of the transmission. This type of radio was named, likely by the press, for the foxhole, a defensive fighting position used during the war. There are also accounts of prisoners of war in World War II and in the Vietnam War having constructed foxhole radios.

== History ==
The maker of the first foxhole radio is unknown, but it was almost certainly invented by a soldier stationed at the Anzio beachhead during the stalemate of February–May 1944. One of the first newspaper articles about a foxhole radio ran in the New York Times on April 29, 1944. That radio was built by Private Eldon Phelps, of Enid, Oklahoma, who later claimed to have invented the design. It was crude: a razor blade stuck in a piece of wood acted as the detector, and the end of the antenna wire served as a cat whisker. He received broadcasts from Rome and Naples.

The idea spread across the beachhead and beyond. Toivo Kujanpaa built a receiver at Anzio and was able to receive German propaganda programs. The propaganda programs were directed towards Allied military from an Axis station in Rome. Many veterans of Anzio refer to the female announcer they heard as "Axis Sally", the nickname usually used when referring to propagandist Mildred Gillars, however Gillars broadcast from Berlin, and the men at Anzio were more likely hearing Rita Zucca, who broadcast from Rome. Though Gillars is more often associated with the "Sally" moniker, it was Zucca who actually referred to herself as "Sally" during broadcasts.

There were also allied broadcasts available, from the 5th Army Mobile Radio Station and the BBC.

American G.I.s in Italy would put several radios together. The G.I.s would listen at night near the front lines to phonograph records played on a radio station in Rome. One could typically hear a radio station on a foxhole radio if the station was within twenty five or thirty miles. In 1942, Lieutenant Colonel R. G. Wells—a prisoner of war in Japan—built a foxhole radio to get news about the international situation. "The whole POW camp craved news", according to Wells. Richard Lucas, a POW in Vietnam, constructed a radio in camp and built his own earphones.

== Designs and operation ==
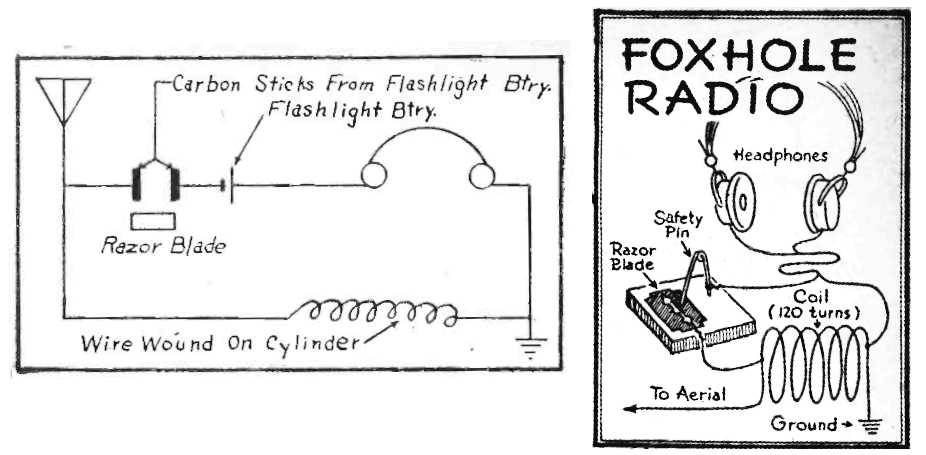
Two circuits used in foxhole radios, from Gernsback's 1944 article

Foxhole radios consisted of a wire aerial, a coil of wire serving as inductor, headphones, and some sort of improvised diode detector to recover rectify the signal. Detectors consisted of an electrical contact between two different conductors with a semiconducting film of corrosion between them. They were devised from various common objects. One common type was made from an oxidized razor blade (rusty or flamed) with a pencil lead pressed against the blade with a safety pin. The oxide layer on the blade and the point contact of the pencil lead form a semiconductor Schottky diode and only allow current to pass in one direction. Only certain sites on the blade acted as diodes, so the soldier moved the pencil lead around on the surface until the radio station was heard in the earphones. Another detector design was a battery carbon resting across the edges of two vertical razor blades, based on the 1879 "microphone" detector of David Edward Hughes.

The aerial is connected to the tuning coil, or inductor, which is grounded at its other end. The coil also has an internal parasitic capacitance which, along with the capacitance of the antenna forms a resonant circuit (tuned circuit) with the inductance of the coil, resonating at a specific resonant frequency. The coil has a high impedance at its resonant frequency, and passes radio signals from the antenna along to the detector, while at other frequencies it had a low impedance so signals at those frequencies passed through the coil to ground. By varying the inductance of the coil with a sliding contact arm, a crystal radio can be tuned to receive different frequencies. Most of these wartime sets did not have a sliding contact and were only built to receive one frequency, the frequency of the nearest broadcast station. The detector and earphones were connected in series, but across the coil, which applied the radio signal of the received radio station. The detector acted like a rectifier, allowing current to flow through it in only one direction, but in a non-linear way, extracting the audio modulation, which then passed through to the earphones. The earphones converted the audio signal to sound waves. Usually the earphones had to be scrounged or borrowed from the unit's communication officer. In one case a soldier, Richard Lucas, built earphones by binding four nails together with cloth then winding wire and dripping wax over the turns. After about ten layers of wire he placed it in a piece of bamboo. A tin can lid was placed over the coil of wire. The listener connected the improvised earphone to the foxhole radio and received three radio stations. The best listening was at night, according to Lucas.

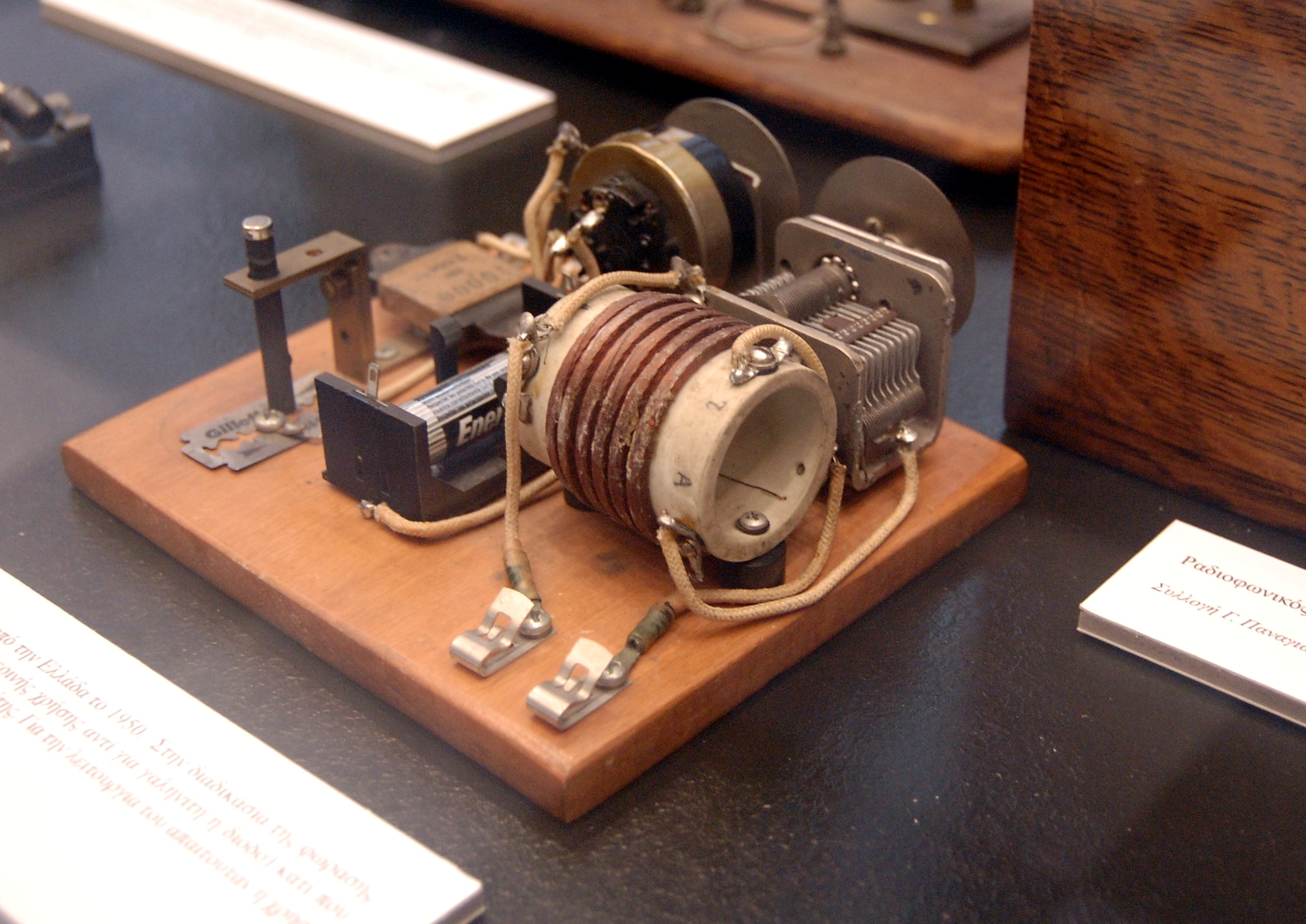

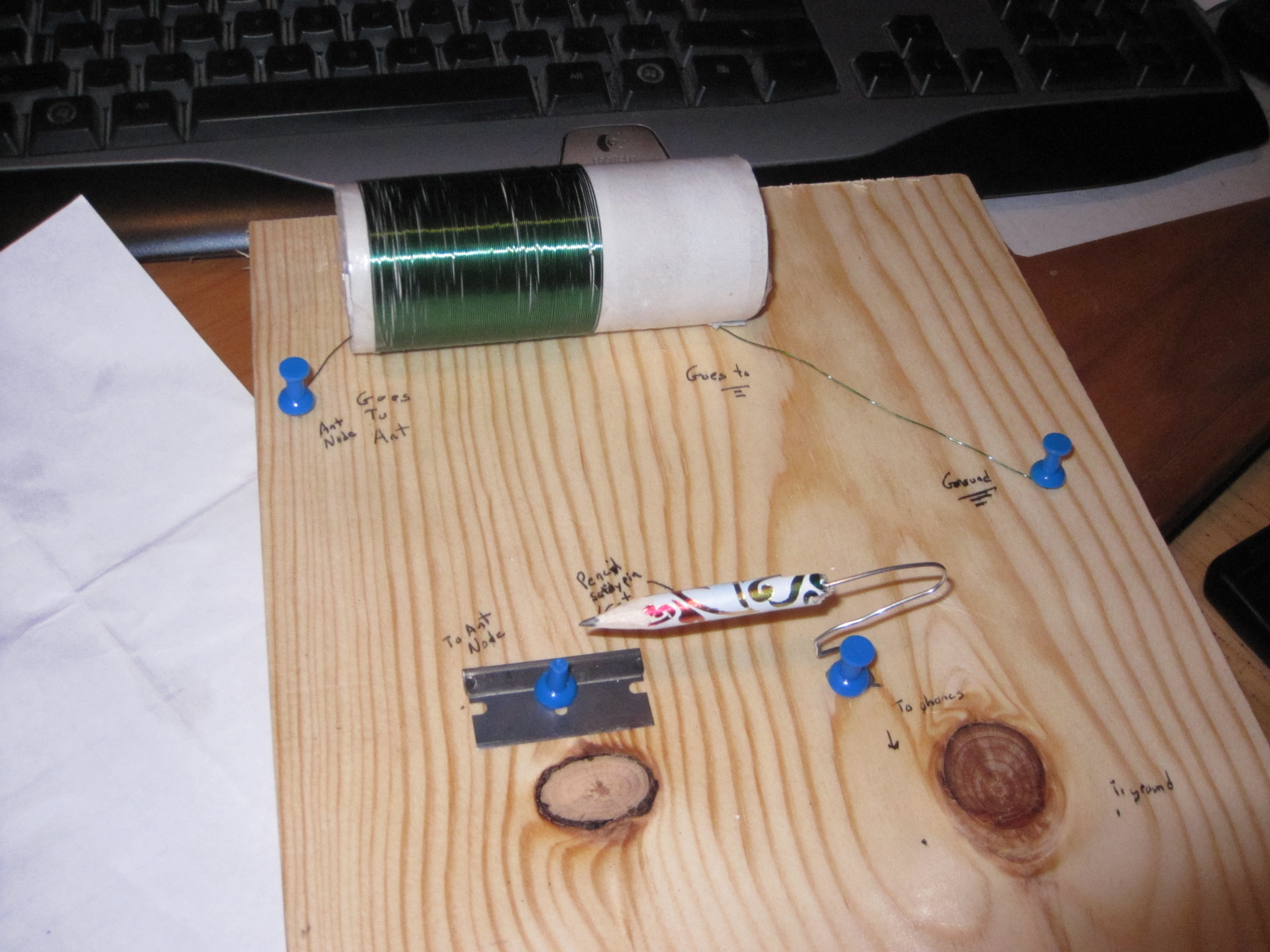

Improvised foxhole radio from coin and safety pin

== See also ==
- Cat's-whisker detector
- Paraset
