= NE612 =

Gilbert cell component that is no longer in production

Block diagram

The NE612 was an integrated circuit for processing of signals, such as in the transmission of radio signals. It consists of an oscillator and a mixer.

It could handle signal frequencies of up to 500 MHz and local oscillator frequencies of up to 200 MHz.

The mixer was a “Gilbert cell” multiplier configuration which provides both a gain of 14 dB and a noise figure of 5 dB at 45 MHz.

The IC belongs to a family of the following ICs: NE602, SA602, NE612 and SA612. It was widely used in amateur radio applications, e.g. in the commercial Elecraft products, and others.
