= Paraset =

WW2 morse code transceiver radio system

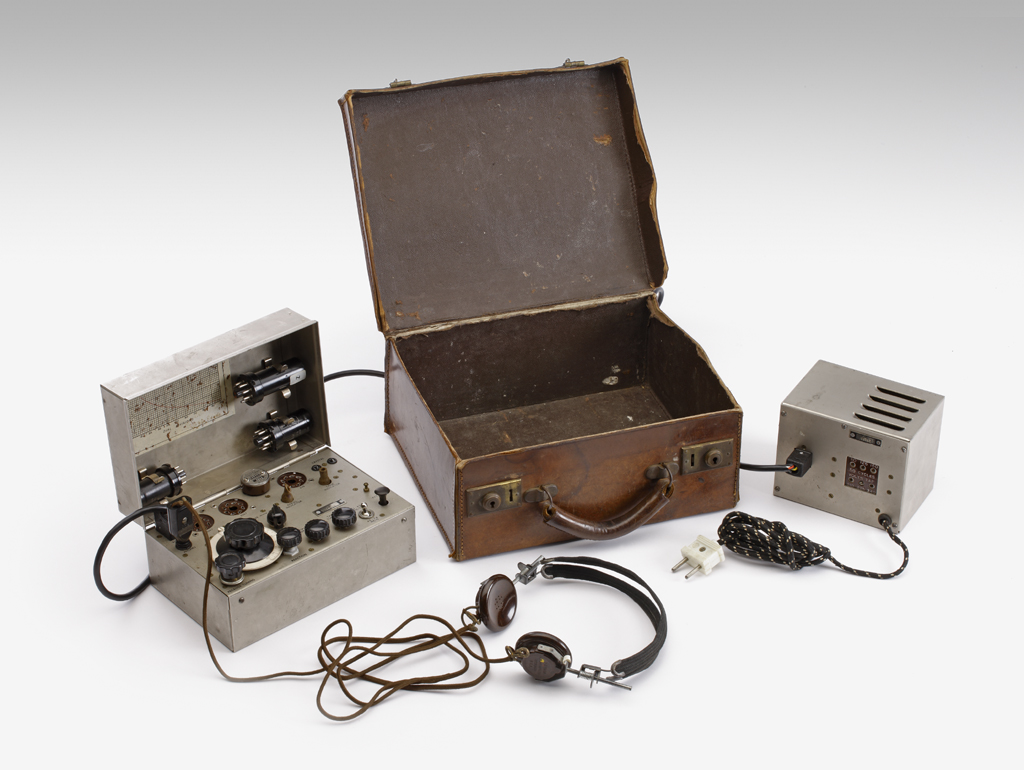
Paraset Mk.7 main components

The Paraset was a small, low-power, thermionic valve, CW-only radio transmitter-receiver supplied to the resistance groups in France, Belgium and the Netherlands during World War II.

== History ==
The Paraset was one of the first successful miniaturized radio sets for Britain's Special Operations Executive which conducted espionage and other underground activities behind German lines during World War II.

The set, known as the Whaddon Mark VII, was used for clandestine radio communication primarily in Norway and Europe, developed at the Royal Signals Special Communications Unit workshops at Little Horwood and the workshops of Whaddon Hall, Buckinghamshire under advice from Lieutenant Colonel Frederick W. Nicholls (SOE Director of Signals) in the early stages of World War II. The equipment is known as the "Paraset" because it was dropped by parachute insertion for field agents and resistance cells.

A number of amateur radio operators build and operate replicas of the Paraset.

== Users ==
- Belgium: Belgian Resistance
- France: French Resistance
- Netherlands: Dutch Resistance Ordedienst (OD) / Dutch stay-behind (Cold War)
- Norway: Norwegian Resistance
- United Kingdom: Special Operations Executive (SIS, MI6)

== See also ==
- Amateur radio homebrew
- List of amateur radio transceivers
- QRP operation
- Vintage amateur radio
- Military Wireless Museum in the Midlands
