= Hamfest =

Convention of amateur radio enthusiasts

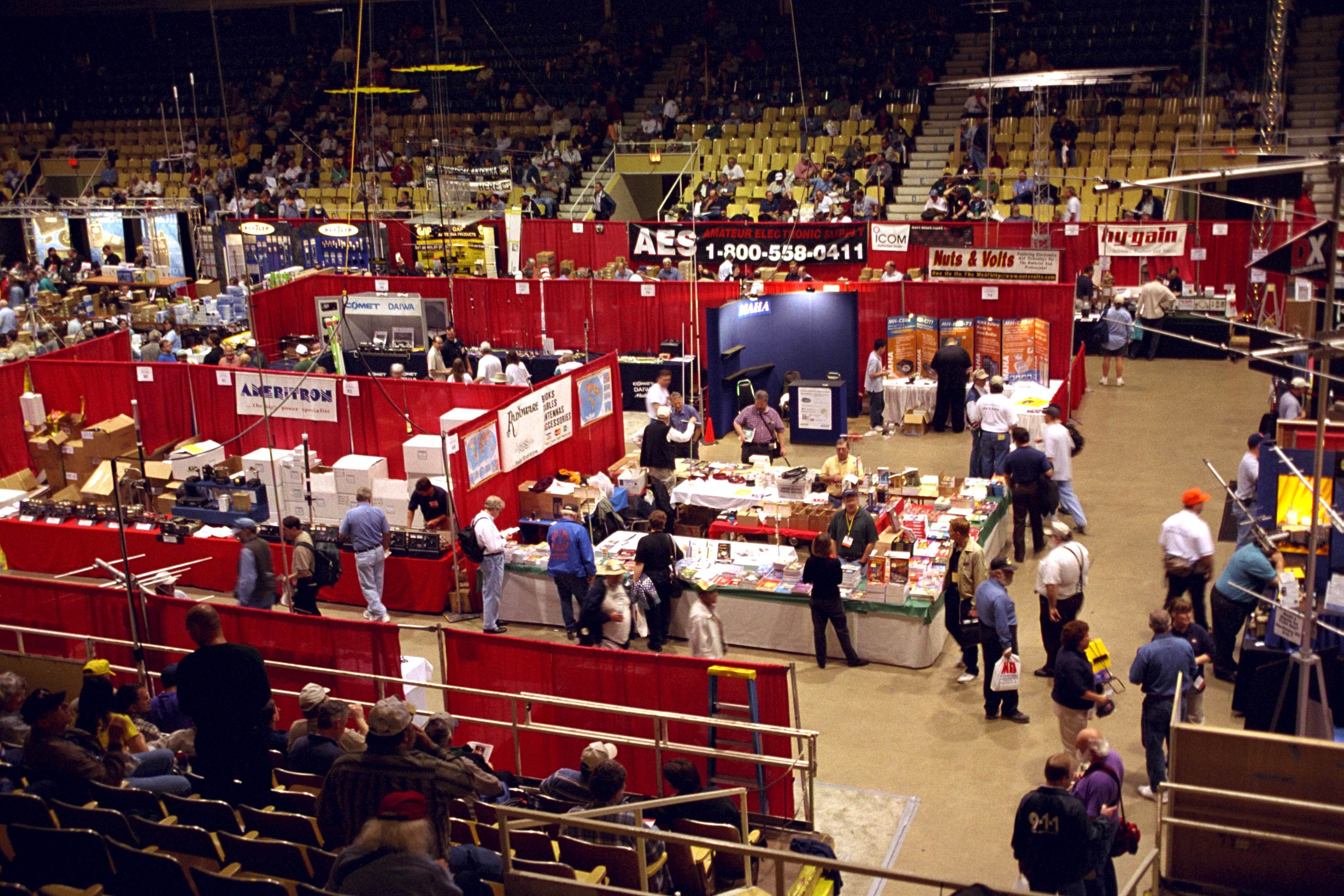
2003 Hamvention in Dayton, Ohio

A hamfest is a convention of amateur radio enthusiasts, often combining a trade show, flea market, and various other activities of interest to amateur radio operators (hams). In the United Kingdom the term rally is more commonly used for amateur radio conventions. "Hamfests" were noted as early as 1924 in the U.S.

== Activities ==
Hamfests are events organized by amateur radio enthusiasts, for social gatherings and promotion of amateur radio hobby. Typically annual or semiannual events are held over a weekend, they can last from several hours to several days. Most feature a flea market where the attendees buy and sell radio and related equipment. The equipment found at a hamfest can vary significantly from the newest high-tech gear to used, refurbished, or even antique equipment. Haggling or bargaining is the most common means of sale. Equipment that was originally sold at great expense to commercial users (such as public safety agencies) can often be found at a fraction of the price. Likewise, accessories which are no longer available from manufacturers may be found, and many sales of complete systems are made to buyers who only need one or two components. Junk boxes are common, frequently containing scraps and remnants from finished projects or equipment long-since gone. Some hamfests feature demonstration and sales booths staffed by vendors and manufacturers of commercial amateur radio equipment. Hamfests may also include meetings of amateur radio clubs, seminars on technical, operational, or legal aspects of amateur radio, and license examination sessions.

The Dayton Hamvention in Dayton, Ohio, U.S.; the ham radio event in Friedrichshafen, Germany; and Tokyo Ham Fair sponsored by Japan Amateur Radio League are events where manufacturers most commonly introduce new products to the amateur radio marketplace.

== Hamfests worldwide ==
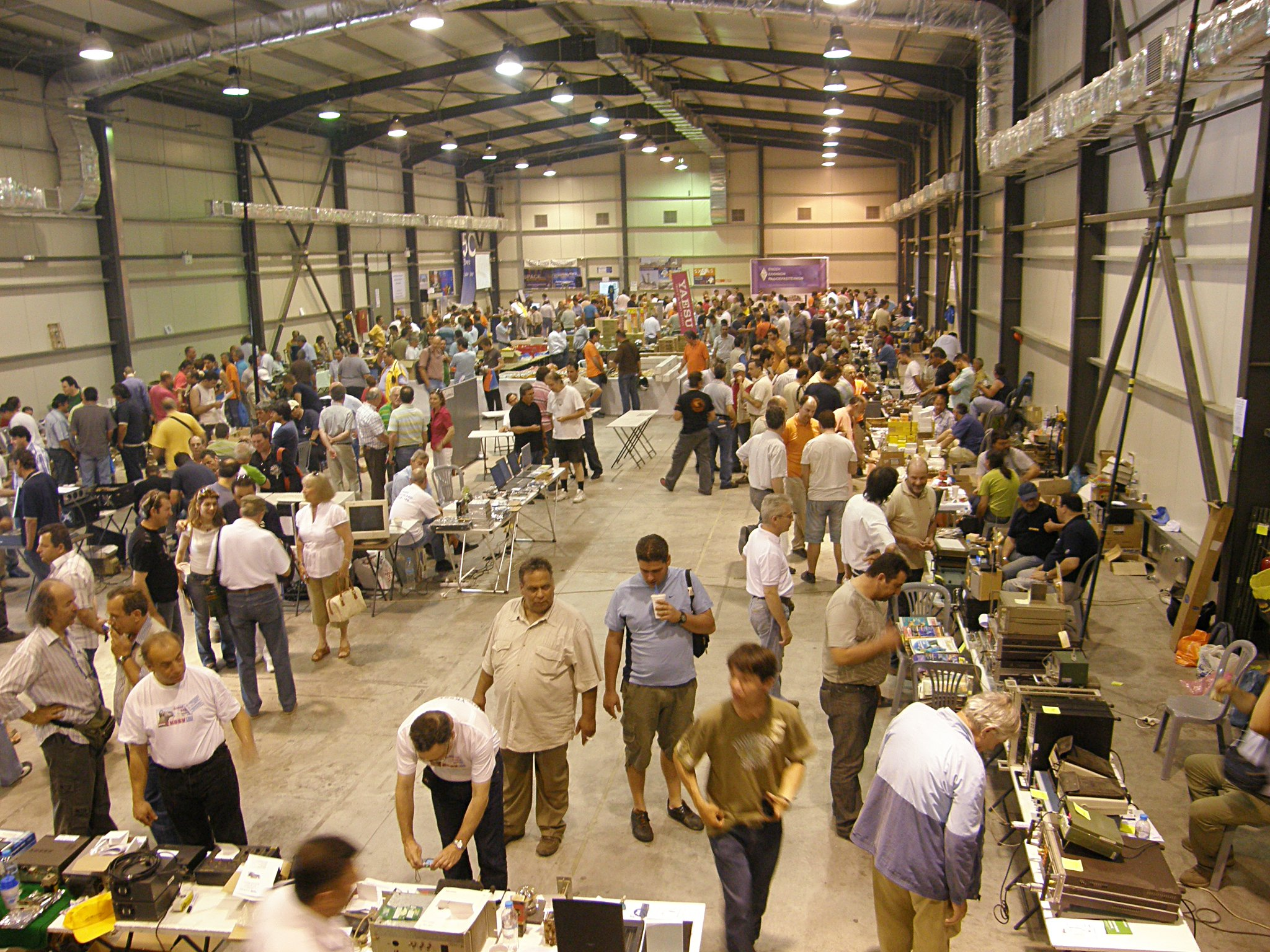
The main hall of the 2008 hamfest of the Radio Amateur Association of Greece.

In the United States, hamfests are a popular tradition; regularly scheduled hamfests in the US begin with an event such as a waffle breakfast, with proceeds going to the sponsoring organization or a worthy charity. Larger hamfests almost always include one or more food vendors, staffed by volunteers, with the proceeds going to a local high school or other charity.

It is not unknown for a seller to ask more for a single part from the box than for the entire box, the intent being to have less stuff when it's time to go home than the seller arrived with. Larger old items are often referred to as boat anchors with the suggestion that they are obsolete and of such low value that this is the only use left for them. Numerous jokes are based on this concept, and some sellers will tie ropes to handles, or post signs on especially large and heavy items seeking customers who own aircraft carriers. Regular attendees often visit their first hamfest in search of some piece of equipment, but end up returning due to the social aspect.

In the current century, the Internet has come to be used to advertise and sell ham radio equipment, downgrading the sales of useful used equipment at all hamfests. This has, in many cases, caused the disappearance of many local and regional hamfests. Thus, hamfests' social aspects have become more of a reason to attend as well as to learn from the numerous lecturers and forums. Door prizes and raffles also occur. Also, inspection of the vast array of commercially made new radio equipment (conveniently available in one place) and the extensive inclusion of computers and computer parts and software for sale rise in importance at these events.

Japan, the primary source for new commercially made ham equipment, hosts at least one large annual hamfest with world-wide attendees. The 2024 Japan Amateur Radio League convention received over 40,000 paying attendees in 2022.

The Dayton Hamvention was considered to be the world's largest hamfest in the 2010s. It is held each May (formerly at the Hara Arena in Trotwood, Ohio near Dayton) at the Greene County Fairgrounds and Expo Center in Xenia, Ohio. The Hamvention offers forums, exhibit space and a flea market. Average attendance is around 25,000; there were 28,417 visitors in 2018. Many amateur radio enthusiasts go out of their way to attend the Hamvention, travelling from all over the United States, Canada, Mexico and various parts of the world and even as far as Australia, Japan and Russia.

The second largest hamfest in the U.S. is the Orlando HamCation in Orlando, Florida with over 23,000 visitors per year and 74 years running. Smaller regional hamfests include the 60 year young Shelby Hamfest in North Carolina, hosting 5,000 to 7,000 visitors per year, Huntsville Hamfest in Alabama, Atlanta Hamfest celebrating 90 Years, and SEA-PAC in Seaside, Oregon. Hamfests can also be as small as a few hundred local attendees.

The largest hamfest in New England (and the Northeastern United States) is the New England Amateur Radio Festival, commonly known as NEAR-Fest, which is held twice a year, May and October, at the Deerfield Fairgrounds in Deerfield, New Hampshire. Deerfield is located approximately 15 miles (24 km) east of Manchester on Route 43. The DFW Ham Radio Expo is held every June in Lewisville, Texas.

Two of the largest Hamfests in Canada are HAM-EX, held by the Peel Amateur Radio Club (PeelARC) and the Mississauga Amateur Radio Club (MARC), once a year at the Brampton Fall Fairgrounds just north of Brampton, Ontario, and the York Region Amateur Radio Club (YRARC), on the first Saturday of November each year at the Newmarket Community Centre Newmarket, Ontario. Both of these Hamfests typically attract over a thousand visitors each year. Many smaller Hamfests are also held in every province across Canada each year. A full listing of Canadian Hamfests can be found on the Radio Amateurs of Canada (RAC) website.

In Western Australia, the biggest Hamfest is run by the Northern Corridor Radio Group. They held their first few at the former Carine TAFE College site. Following its closure their hamfests have been held in Bassendean, a suburb of Perth. 2007 saw a demonstration of military radio equipment and a demonstration of a tesla coil. These were in addition to the "bring and buy" tables and stands for various retailers and groups.

In the United Kingdom the two largest hamfests, referred to locally as Radio Rallies, are held by the Radio Society of Great Britain and National Hamfest Ltd. Many smaller Rallies are held by Radio Clubs up and down the country such as The Stockport Radio Society and the Lincoln Short Wave Club among others.

The International Exhibition for Radio Amateurs known as HAM RADIO in Friedrichshafen, Germany, is Europe's largest and most well-known hamfest (17,080 visitors in 2015), which includes a trade show and "youth days". The first HAM RADIO took place in 1976 with 62 exhibitors.

In India, Hamfest has been popular since 1991. In 2009, it was held in Bangalore, along with Golden Jubilee celebrations of Bangalore Amateur Radio Club VU2ARC Two ham conventions, with mostly forums, were held by the National Institute of Amateur Radio in Hyderabad in recent years which uniquely coupled the events with major DXpeditions, allowing foreign hams to operate from the rare locales of Andaman I and Lakshadweep I.
