= Radio spectrum scope =

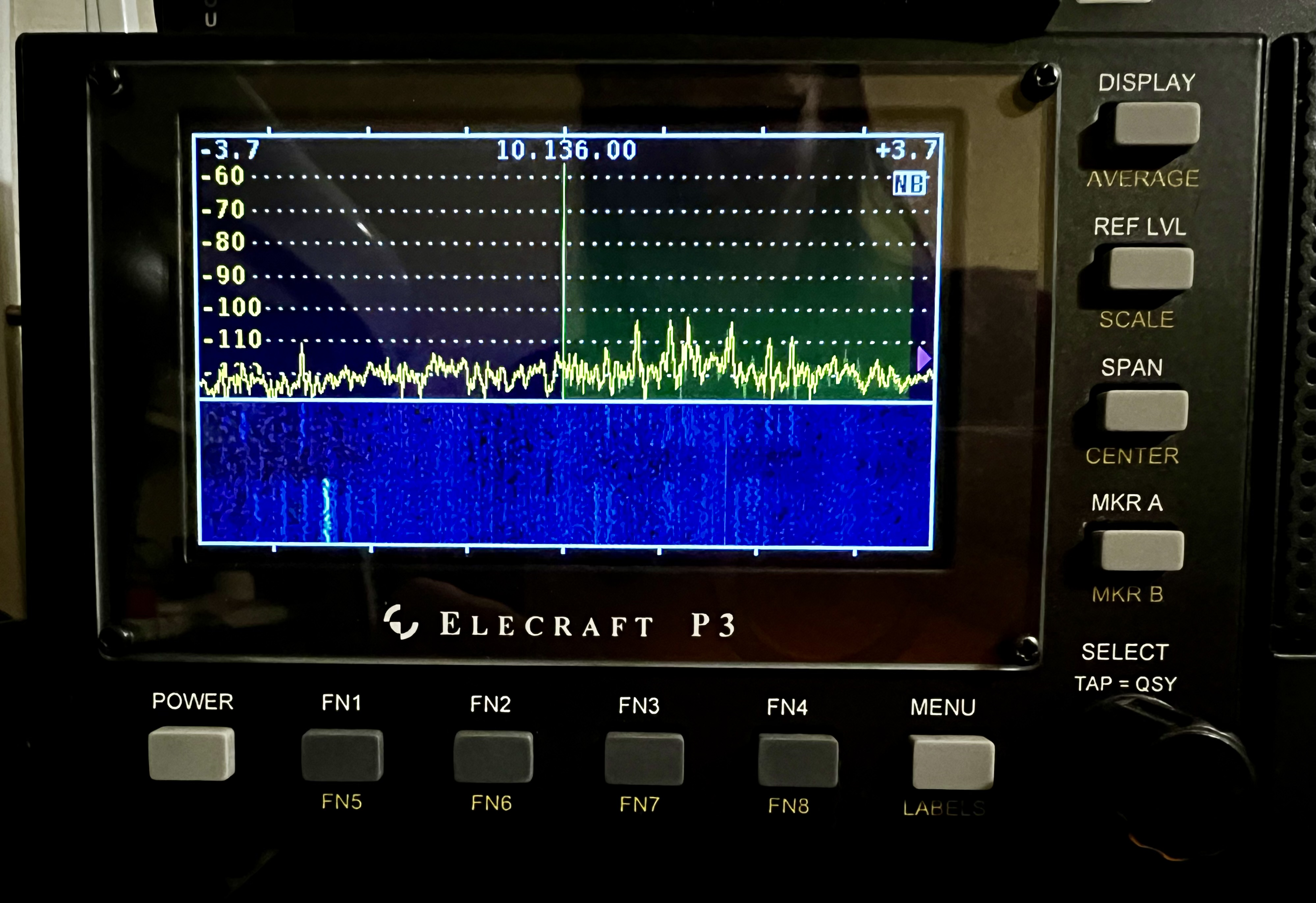
A modern Elecraft P3 Panadapter

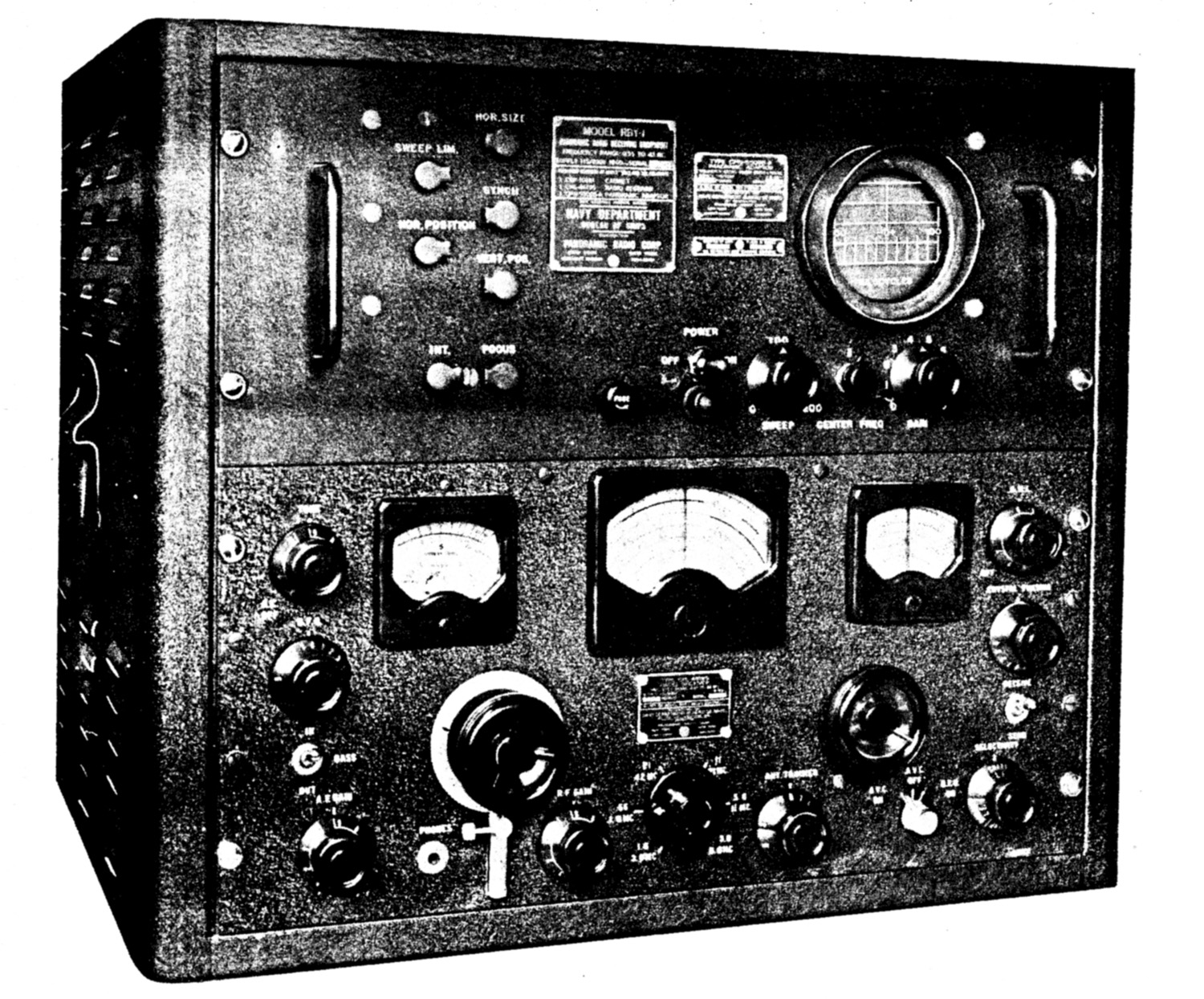
RBY-1, US Navy Panoramic Radio Adapter RBY-1 with Hallicrafters SX-28. The Panoramic Radio Adapter is the upper part.

The radio spectrum scope (also radio panoramic receiver, panoramic adapter, pan receiver, pan adapter, panadapter, panoramic radio spectroscope, panoramoscope, panalyzor and band scope) was invented by Marcel Wallace - and measures and shows the magnitude of an input signal versus frequency within one or more radio bands - e.g. shortwave bands. A spectrum scope is normally a lot cheaper than a spectrum analyzer, because the aim is not high quality frequency resolution - nor high quality signal strength measurements.

The spectrum scope use can be to:

- find radio channels quickly of known and unknown signals when receiving.
- find radio amateurs activity quickly e.g. with the intent of communicating with them.

Modern spectrum scopes, like the Elecraft P3, also plot signal frequencies and amplitudes over time, in a rolling format called a waterfall plot.
