= Cannibalization (marketing) =

Reduced sales when new product is announced

In marketing strategy, cannibalization is a reduction in sales volume, sales revenue, or market share of one product when the same company introduces a new product.

== Examples ==
In e-commerce, some companies intentionally cannibalize their retail sales through lower prices on their online product offerings. More consumers than usual may buy the discounted products, especially if they'd previously been anchored to the retail prices. Even though their in-store sales might decline, the company may see overall gains.

Another example of cannibalization occurs when a retailer discounts a particular product. The tendency of consumers is to buy the discounted product rather than competing products with higher prices. When the promotion event is over and prices return to normal, however, the effect will tend to disappear. This temporary change in consumer behavior can be described as cannibalization, though scholars do not normally use the phrase "cannibalization" to denote such a phenomenon.

In project evaluation, the estimated profit generated from the new product must be reduced by the earnings on the lost sales.

Another common case of cannibalization is when companies, particularly retail companies, open sites too close to each other, in effect, competing for the same customers. The potential for cannibalization is often discussed when considering companies with many outlets in an area, such as Starbucks or McDonald's.

=== Brand extension ===
Cannibalization is an important issue in marketing strategy when an organization aims to carry out brand extension. Normally, when a brand extension is carried out from one sub-category (e.g. Marlboro) to another sub-category (e.g. Marlboro Light), there is an eventuality of a part of the former's sales being taken away by the latter. However, if the strategic intent of such an extension is to capture a larger market of a different market segment notwithstanding the potential loss of sales in an existing segment, the move to launch the new product can be termed as "cannibalization strategy". In India, where the passenger-car segment is going up dramatically since the turn of this century, Maruti Suzuki's launch of Suzuki Alto in the same sub-category as Maruti 800, which was the leader of the small-car segment to counter the competition from Hyundai is seen to be a classic case of cannibalization strategy.

=== SEO ===
Cannibalization is also referenced in the search engine optimization (SEO) industry; it is known as keyword cannibalization. Keyword cannibalization happens when multiple pages on a website specifically target the same content, to the point where the search engine has a difficult time determining which page is most relevant for the search query, and thus might not necessarily promote the page one would want website visitors to see most.

== Positive effects: increasing market share ==
A company engaging in corporate cannibalism is effectively competing against itself. There are two main reasons companies do this. Firstly, the company wants to increase its market share and is taking a gamble that introducing the new product will harm other competitors more than the company itself. Secondly, the company may believe that the new product will sell better than the first, or will sell to a different sort of buyer. For example, a company may manufacture cars, and later begin manufacturing trucks. While both products appeal to the same general market (drivers) one may fit an individual's needs better than the other. However, corporate cannibalism often has negative effects: the car manufacturer's customer base may begin buying trucks instead of cars, resulting in good truck sales, but not increasing the company's market share. There may even be a decrease. This is also called market cannibalization.

In the context of a carefully planned strategy, cannibalization can be effective, by ultimately growing the market, or better meeting consumer demands.

Cannibalization is a key consideration in product portfolio analysis. For example, when Apple introduced the iPad, it took sales away from the original Macintosh, but ultimately led to an expanded market for consumer computing hardware.

== Cost assessment ==
To accurately determine the success of a new product it is important to understand the detriment its sales are having to older products in a company's line up. The danger is the new products are taking from old products made by the business instead of increasing market share by taking consumers from competing products made by different businesses. A model was created in 2012 to gauge the change in sales.

Sales change for focal new model (at time t) = + change in demand for other models within same brand and category + change in demand for other brands within category + change in demand for other models within same brand in other categories + change in demand for other brands in other categories + primary demand (time is in weeks)

This model needs to try and deal with three problems with accurately estimating the success of a new product. Market volatility means many new products enter and leave the market making it harder to understand what specific product is affecting the market share. Slowness of the market to react to new products that have been introduced, meaning that there has to be time scope allowing for seasonal changes and the consumers to act accordingly. Correlated error structures may permeate the brand as not just one product will be effected so it is important to understand the scope of the commodity and see total impact. The model tries to mitigate these areas of error that make older models less reliable.

There is also the danger of multiple distribution channel cannibalization which can lead to job insecurity and risk for the old channels as the new channels open. In the case of travel agencies; in the past nearly all travel groups relied on them as an intermediary for tourism, this meant face to face meetings to introduce the products or services that one group wishes to sell to the travelers. In recent years with new technology the necessity of travel agencies has been declining, with people being able to connect to the businesses they need to travel directly and cheaper than going through the more conventional means. Airlines and similar tourism focused companies instead push through marketing the populace towards using their website instead of booking with a tourism agency, this is because it's cheaper to run and can be more convenient for the consumer. So the update in technology has forced market cannibalization to cut the spending in certain business groups leading to job insecurity, decreased job satisfaction, job alienation and risk aversion.

Cannibalization can be a necessary evil in some cases. As sales plateau and then decline, a business must innovate in order to maintain market share. Nitin Pangarkar said that businesses must maximize competitiveness with business strategy and cannibalization is part of this. Cannibalization of markets is competing with the success of others, and self-cannibalization is competing with yourself. As Steve Jobs said when he released the iPhone: "If you don't cannibalize yourself, someone else will".

== Risks ==
The diversion of sales from one product to another or from the same product to a different product can adversely effect the overall sales of a business. Wendy Lomax theorized that using a brand name and leverage of current users of a brand to push them into using a new product can be a large risk. This is due to the damaging nature which a failed product would have on the preexisting parent product. As sales dropped from the new product after it is no longer pushed there is no guarantee that sales will stabilize to the old product that was sacrificed for the current item. One of the unavoidable risks is to the established product but for self-cannibalization and growth this is essential.

Apple cannibalized their own sales of the iPad when the iPhone 6 was released in September 2014. According to a Forbes article, shipment of iPads was down 23% since the announcement of the iPhone 6. This is due to the new product (the iPhone) being large enough to have a lot of the features of the iPad without being as large making the iPad outdated and irrelevant. While the iPhone shipped massive amounts of product, the iPad never recovered to its previous sales plateau. Overall, this is a positive effect as turnover of new products allows company to get old users to spend money and keeps their products current which is very important in technology related fields. This is still an example of Apple betting sales of the old product to get higher sales on a new product in this case it was a success.

== See also ==
- Boat anchor (metaphor) – Metaphor for outdated equipment
- Knock-down kit – Collection of manufactured parts for assembly
- New product development – Complete process of bringing a new product to market
- Osborne effect – Sales impact of premature product announcements
- Product management – Organizational role in companies
