= Radio Amateur Association of Greece =

Ένωσις Ελλήνων Ραδιοερασιτεχνών Radio Amateur Association of Greece
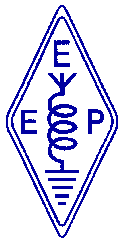
- Abbreviation: RAAG, ΈΕΡ
- Formation: 1958
- Type: Non-profit organization
- Legal status: active
- Purpose: Advocacy, Education
- Location(s): Peristeri, Greece KM18ua
- Region served: Greece
- Members: 1150
- Official language: Greek
- President: Emmanuel Darkadakis SV1IW
- Main organ: SV NEA
- Affiliations: International Amateur Radio Union
- Budget: €35,000
- Website: https://www.raag.org/
- Remarks: Club station callsign: SZ1SV

The Radio Amateur Association of Greece (RAAG) (in Greek, Ένωσις Ελλήνων Ραδιοερασιτεχνών - ΕΕΡ) is a national non-profit organization for amateur radio enthusiasts in Greece. The society was founded in February 1958, facing great difficulties due to negative attitude of the Greek Government of the time towards amateur radio. RAAG represents the interests of Greek amateur radio operators before national, European, and international telecommunications regulatory authorities. RAAG is the national member society representing Greece in the International Amateur Radio Union. Key membership benefits of RAAG include the sponsorship of amateur radio operating awards and radio contests, and a QSL bureau for those members who regularly communicate with amateur radio operators in other countries.

The Radio Amateur Association of Greece is governed by the President and six other committee members, who are elected by secret ballot for a period of two years.

== Activities ==
- RAAG organizes the national Field Day on the first full weekend of September and issues awards to participating Greek amateur radio stations.
- On the first weekend of June the society organizes a regular annual Hamfest in Athens area.
- RAAG is active in emergency radio communications (EmComm) in cooperation with a number of local radio clubs and societies, under the name HARES or Hellenic Amateur Radio Emergency Services (Greek: Ομάδες Έκτακτης Ανάγκης or Ο.Ε.Α.).
- RAAG maintains a nationwide network of voice repeaters and packet radio digipeaters throughout Greece, as well as a small number of radio propagation beacons.
- A club radio station is located in the central office of RAAG in downtown Athens.

== Publications ==
The society publishes a bimonthly bulletin, SV-News (Greek: SV-Νέα, ISSN 1106-191X), covering technical topics and amateur radio operation activities. In addition, the society publishes a number of training and operating guide books in the Greek language. In 2008 it acquired the rights in the Greek language for the book "Ethics and Operating Procedures for the Radio Amateur" , which was translated in Greek.

== Gallery ==
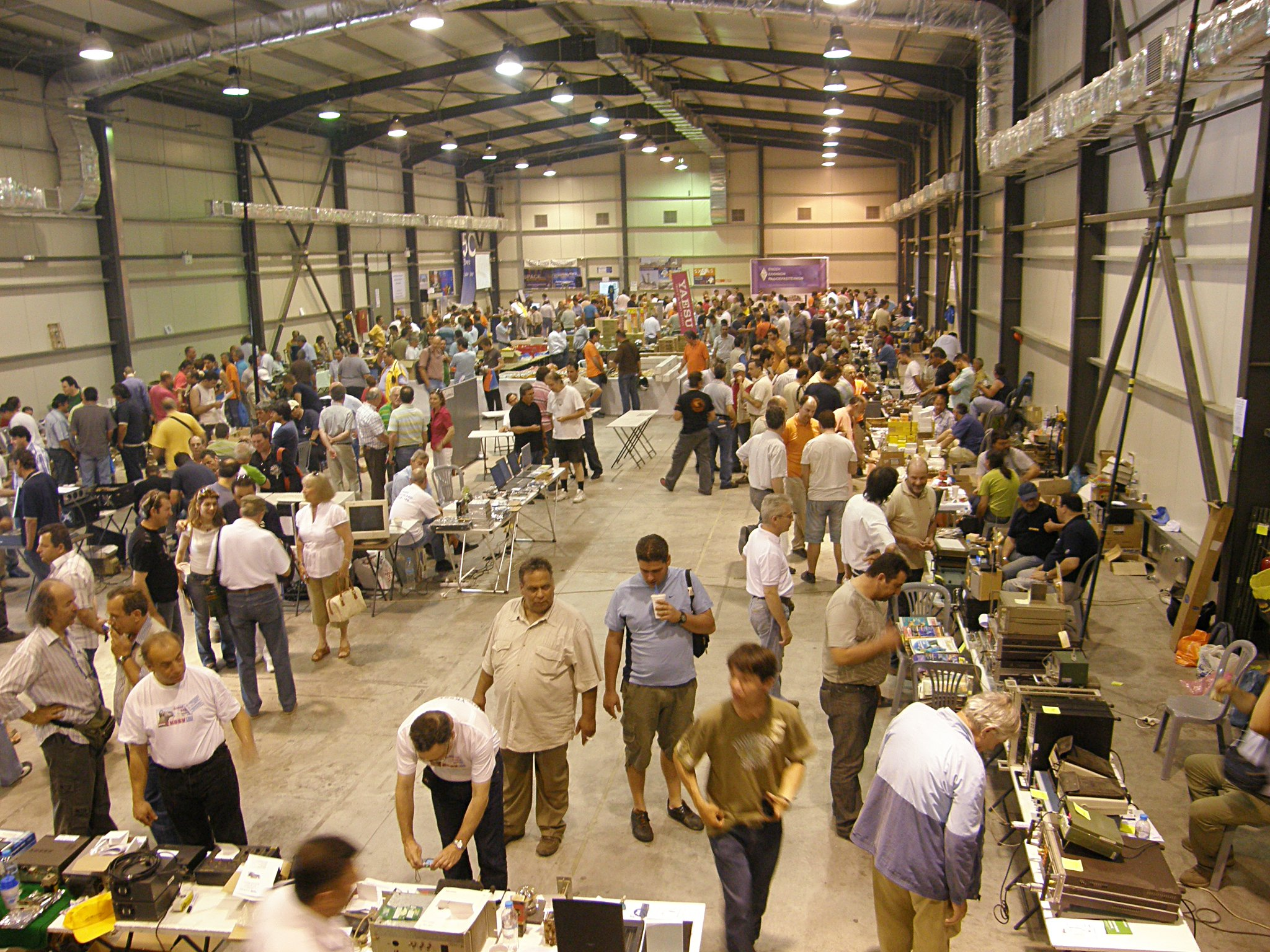
The main hall of 2008 RAAG hamfest.

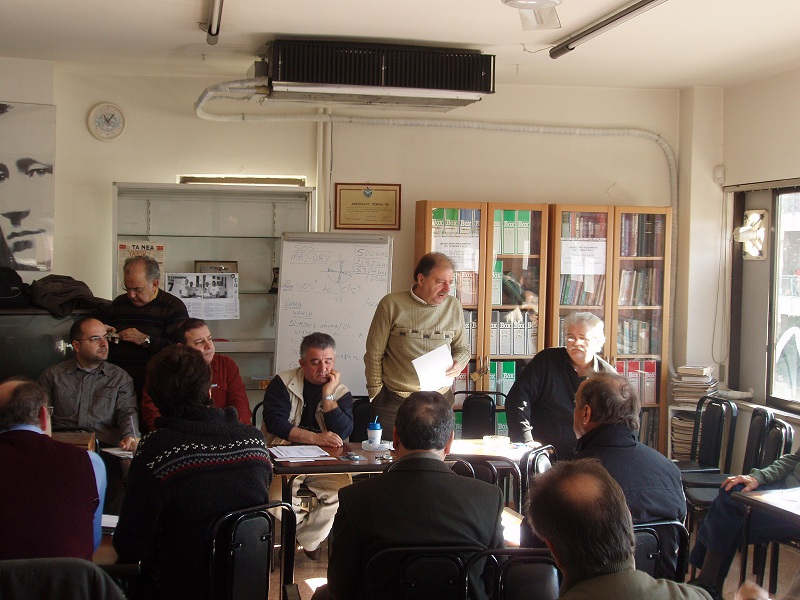
RAAG General Assembly 2008

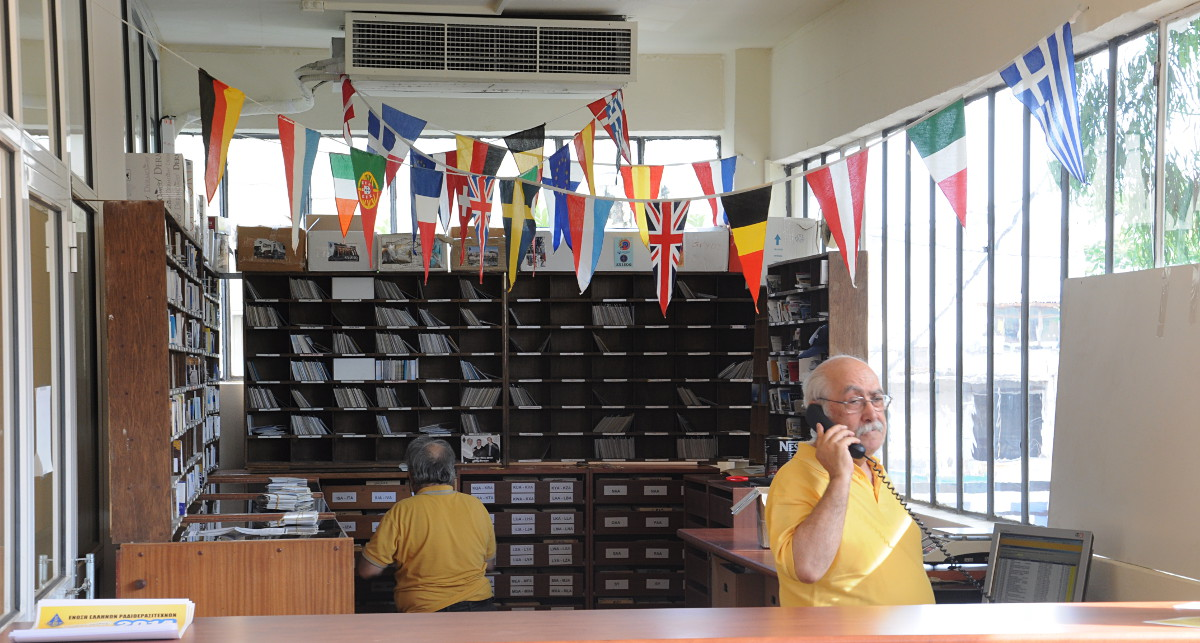
RAAG QSL bureau

== See also ==
- International Amateur Radio Union
