= Market cannibalism =

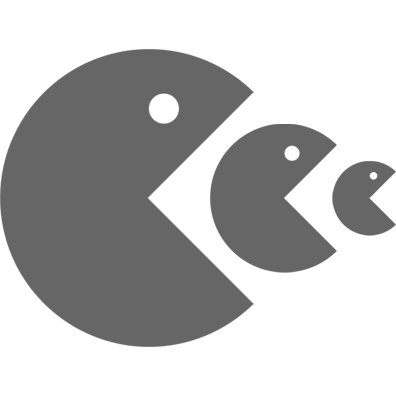

Market cannibalization, market cannibalism, or corporate cannibalism is the practice of slashing the price of a product or introducing a new product into a market of established product categories. If a company is practising market cannibalization, it is seen to be eating its own market and, in so doing, hoping to get a bigger share of it. Concretely, it refers to the principle of a newly introduced product B eating up the market shares of an already established product A, both usually coming from the same company. In this case, both products belong to the same category of products. This occurrence can have either a positive or negative impact on the company's bottom line, can be accidental or deliberate, in which case it is commonly called cannibalisation strategy.

An interesting example is one involving a company achieving lower productions costs for a product produced in a socially evolved country than for the same product produced in a socially weak country. In this case, lower production costs are easily achieved by virtue of the lower wages and social costs. This type of market and corporate cannibalism is one factor that makes it hard today in Europe for example to find any computer not produced in China. At the same time, companies like Foxconn achieved not only low production costs, but also made it possible for innovative products to get on the market.

== Market cannibalism process ==
A company has a product A which is well established within its market. The same company decides to market a product B, which happens to be somewhat similar to product A, therefore both belonging to the same market, attracting similar clients. This leads to both products being forced to share the market, reducing the market share of product A, as part of it is eaten up by product B.

Suppose that pet-food manufacturers A, B and C offer one line of tinned cat food each, and that the customers cannot really distinguish between them, thereby giving them 33.33% share of the market, each. Suppose that manufacturer C then launches a new labelling of cat food called D. On the face of it, it cuts the market share of product C from 33.33% to 25%, but in reality the manufacturer of C now has 50% of the market share, as opposed to 25% each for its rival manufacturers.

This example shows the complexity of the subject and the relationship of market or corporate cannibalism with market evolution.

== Cannibalisation strategy ==
Companies can seek to cannibalise their own market shares through market cannibalism (or corporate cannibalism in this particular case), for two predominant reasons: gaining an overall greater market share within a same category of products at the expense of losing a single well established product's market share, or simply because they believe the second product will sell better than the first. As well as perhaps selling better than the first product, the second product may also sell to a different type of customer, further emphasising the increase of global market share.

A third possible reason for deliberate cannibalisation would be to increase profit margin, due to the cheaper production costs of product B over product A.

=== Gaining global market share ===
Market cannibalism can also be used to the company's advantage, if the latter looks to increase its global market share, spread through multiple products. The company that best illustrates this process is Coca-Cola, when it started developing a wider catalogue of drinks such as Coca-Cola Light, Zero, Vanilla, Cherry and many more. As the market share of the original Coca-Cola drink shrank, the marketing of these new drinks increased the company's soda market share.

By doing this, the company's intention is to harm their competition even more than they harm themselves in order to gain global market share.

=== Increasing customer loyalty ===
This strategy also helps win the loyalty of customers, as they will move from one product marketed by a particular brand to another by the same brand. This is the case for Gillette Sensor razor's customers, two thirds of which are estimated to already being Gillette customers for another model of razors. The example confirms the two-sided impact of market cannibalism on a firm - although old razor models become obsolete and lose market share, customers move on to different models, marketed by the same company, therefore increasing customer loyalty - shoppers are inclined to buy products from a brand they already know.

=== Increasing profit margin ===
If product B is more economical to manufacture than product A, by virtue of different materials being used or new technology allowing cheaper production, a company will evidently attempt to cannibalise product A's market share with the marketing of product B. This deliberate cannibalisation has the straightforward objective to increase the second product's market so much that product A's is surpassed by it.

This is the case for the computer market over the past decade or so. Every year, computer based companies market machines that are more and more powerful, and cheaper to make thanks to technological advancements. Computer based companies attempt to promote their newer models every year because of this, as it allows them to further increase their profit margin.

The price a buyer would have to pay for a personal computer has immensely decreased over the years, as the index dropped over 20% every year, from 1999 to 2003, and now decreasing by 11% to 12% annually.

== Importance of innovation ==
A hypothesis is that by better controlling innovation as a reason for market and corporate cannibalism, higher wages and better social standards can be achieved for the whole market and corporation than those that can be achieved without innovation control.

Research and development plays a crucial role in the increasing of market share, a company's ultimate goal. Being costly in terms of money and time, a company will seek to invest in what they believe will gain them the most market share. This decision can lead to either success - as it was the case for Coca-Cola when introducing a new line of drinks - or failure, as it was the case for Kodak who went from commanding 85% of camera sales in the U.S., according to a 2005 case study for Harvard Business School, to entering Chapter 11 bankruptcy and being delisted from the New York Stock Exchange.

Their downfall was due to their investments being ill-placed, as they refused to seek innovation, afraid that it would cannibalise their already established products. Had they invested in digital cameras, as technology advancements were thriving, rather than spent all development money into creating the Kodak Funtime, they may have continued to be a leading camera company today? This example shows the importance of companies cannibalising the market share of their own products, in order to keep a globally higher market share and prevent competition from cannibalising them, which ultimately leads to the first becoming obsolete.

Although market cannibalism can have a deteriorating effect on a certain product's market share, a popular saying claims that it is "better to cannibalise yourself than let someone else do it". The P&G group did better than Kodak in the 1930s, in the sense that it developed brands like Tide and Cheer, both belonging to the laundry detergent market, in order to gain as much market share as possible and prevent competition from entering the market.

== Measuring cannibalisation ==
There is no such thing as a standard measurement of cannibalisation, as the definition of it will differ according to different people. However, a common, although not the only, way to measure it is to examine the sales lost by the first product once the second has been marketed. The rate then belongs between 0 and 100 - being closer to the latter translates to a higher cannibalisation rate, therefore a greater loss of sales of product A caused by the launch of product B.

Buday (1989, p. 29) suggests that: "Excessive cannibalization is one of the common arguments against brand- extending.... Common branding implies a similarity: similarity invites replacement."

=== Cannibalisation rate ===
According to UPenn's Marketing Maths Essentials website, the cannibalisation rate corresponds to: "The percentage of New Product Unit Volume that are sales that would have gone to the Old Product had the New Product not been introduced".

Cannibalisation rate = Product A buyers opting for product B / Total product B sales

Example: A bakery markets a single plain cookie for $2. However, they decide to introduce a new chocolate chip cookie for $3. The plain cookies made 100 sales a day before the chocolate chip cookie was launched. On the first month of launch, the chocolate chip cookie makes 50 sales a day. However the bakery should not expect to make $350, as what will most likely happen is that a portion of the people who bought the chocolate chip cookie will be plain cookie buyers who will have opted for the second product. Hypothesise that the cannibalisation rate is of 60%.

Chocolate chip cookie sales: 50

Cannibalisation rate: 60%

Plain cookie sales lost: 30 (= 50 x 60 / 100)

New plain cookie sales: 70 (= 100 - 30)

The new total cookie sale has therefore increased from 100 initially, to 120 (= 70 + 50). The bakery has replaced 30 plain cookie sales with 30 chocolate chip cookie sales as well as 20 more chocolate chip cookie sales. This shows the positive aspect of market cannibalism on a business - although the first product's sales decreased, the overall contribution has increased due to the launching of a second product.

== See also ==
- Competition (economics)
- Race to the bottom
