= Raag (surname) =

Family name

Raag is an Estonian surname. Notable people with the surname include:

- Andres Raag (born 1970), Estonian actor and singer
- Ilmar Raag (born 1968), Estonian media executive, screenwriter, and film director
- Kaljo Raag (1892–1967), Estonian weightlifter
- Raimo Raag (born 1953), Swedish-based Estonian linguist and cultural historian
