= Dayton Hamvention =

Amateur radio convention

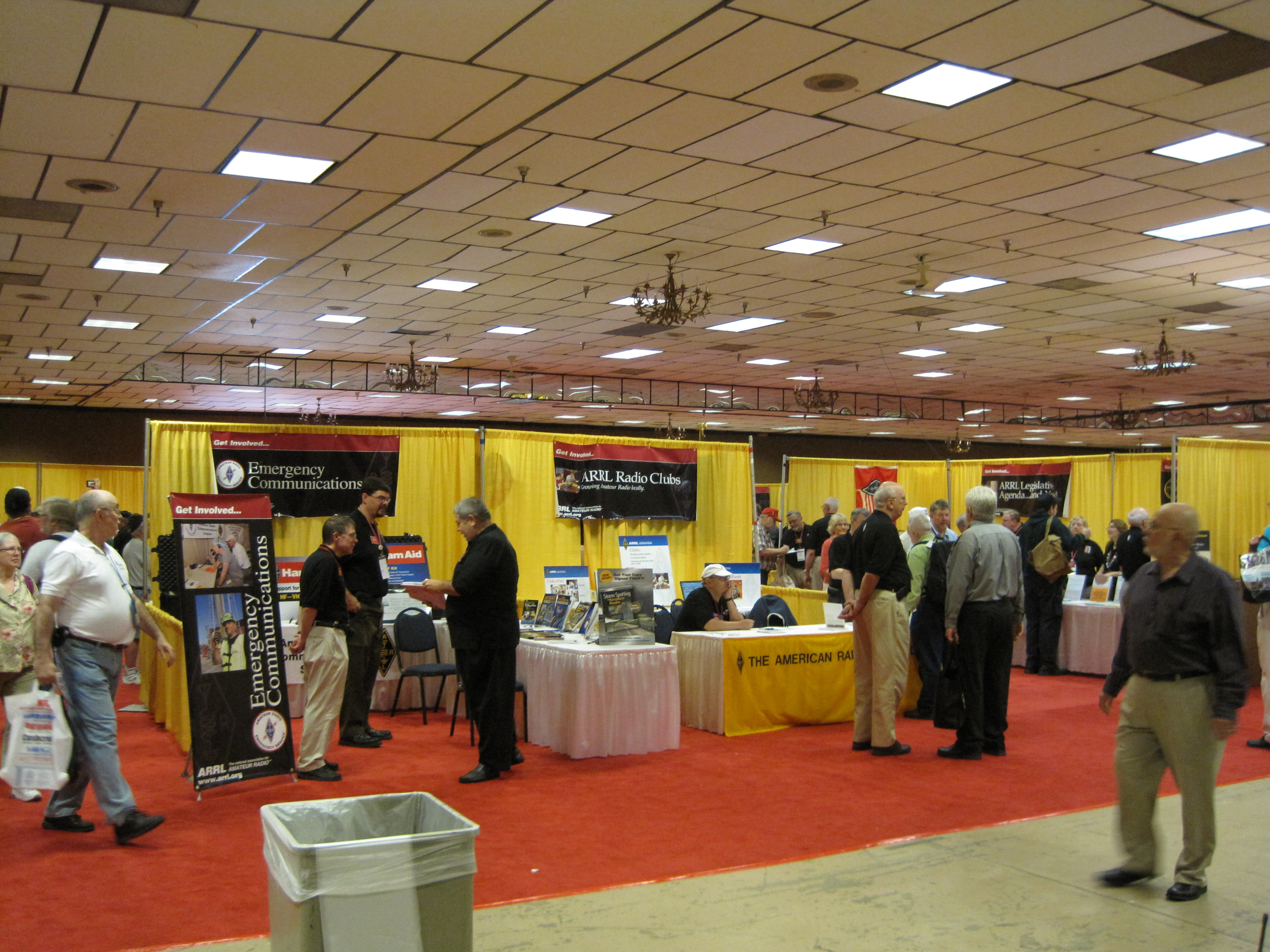
ARRL booth at Hamvention 2010

The Dayton Hamvention is one of the two largest amateur radio conventions (or hamfests) in the world. It is held each May in the Dayton, Ohio area and draws attendees from various parts of the world. Since 2017, it has been held at the Greene County Fairgrounds in Xenia, Ohio near Dayton. Prior to this it was held in late April until 1996 when it changed to mid May at the Hara Arena in Trotwood, Ohio.

== History ==
The first Hamvention occurred on March 22, 1952, at the Biltmore Hotel in Dayton (QST March 1952).

Hara Arena had been the home of Dayton Hamvention since 1964. The Hara Arena announced its closure in 2016 with the 2017 Hamvention being forced to move as a result.

The 2019 Hamvention drew 32,462 paid attendees over its three days, and offered a wide variety of activities for amateur radio enthusiasts, including:

- 5 parallel tracks of forums, classes, and demonstrations covering all aspects of the hobby.
- 6 buildings full of commercial exhibit space, where major amateur equipment manufacturers put their newly announced products on display and smaller companies and amateurs themselves opened booths to display their products including homebrew equipment.
- A large flea market area drawing buyers and sellers of radio parts, old equipment, accessories, and a wide range of other merchandise.
- Amateur radio license exams for newcomers as well as for hams who want to upgrade their current license levels.
- Over two dozen food and drink vendors, serving a wide range of breakfast and lunch specialties.
- Numerous affiliated events held by local hams after the gates have closed or at close by locations.

=== Cancellations ===
The 2020 Dayton Hamvention was canceled due to the COVID-19 pandemic, the first cancellation in the 68-year history of the event.

On January 11, 2021, Hamvention Organizers Dayton Amateur Radio Association (DARA) announced that the 2021 event had also been cancelled, citing delays in widespread availability of vaccines for the COVID-19 virus and the emergence of more communicable forms of the virus.

The annual Hamvention resumed in 2022.
