= Elecraft =

American radio manufacturer

Elecraft Inc.
- Company type: Amateur radio manufacturer
- Industry: Amateur radio
- Founded: 1998
- Headquarters: Watsonville, California, U.S.A
- Website: http://www.elecraft.com/

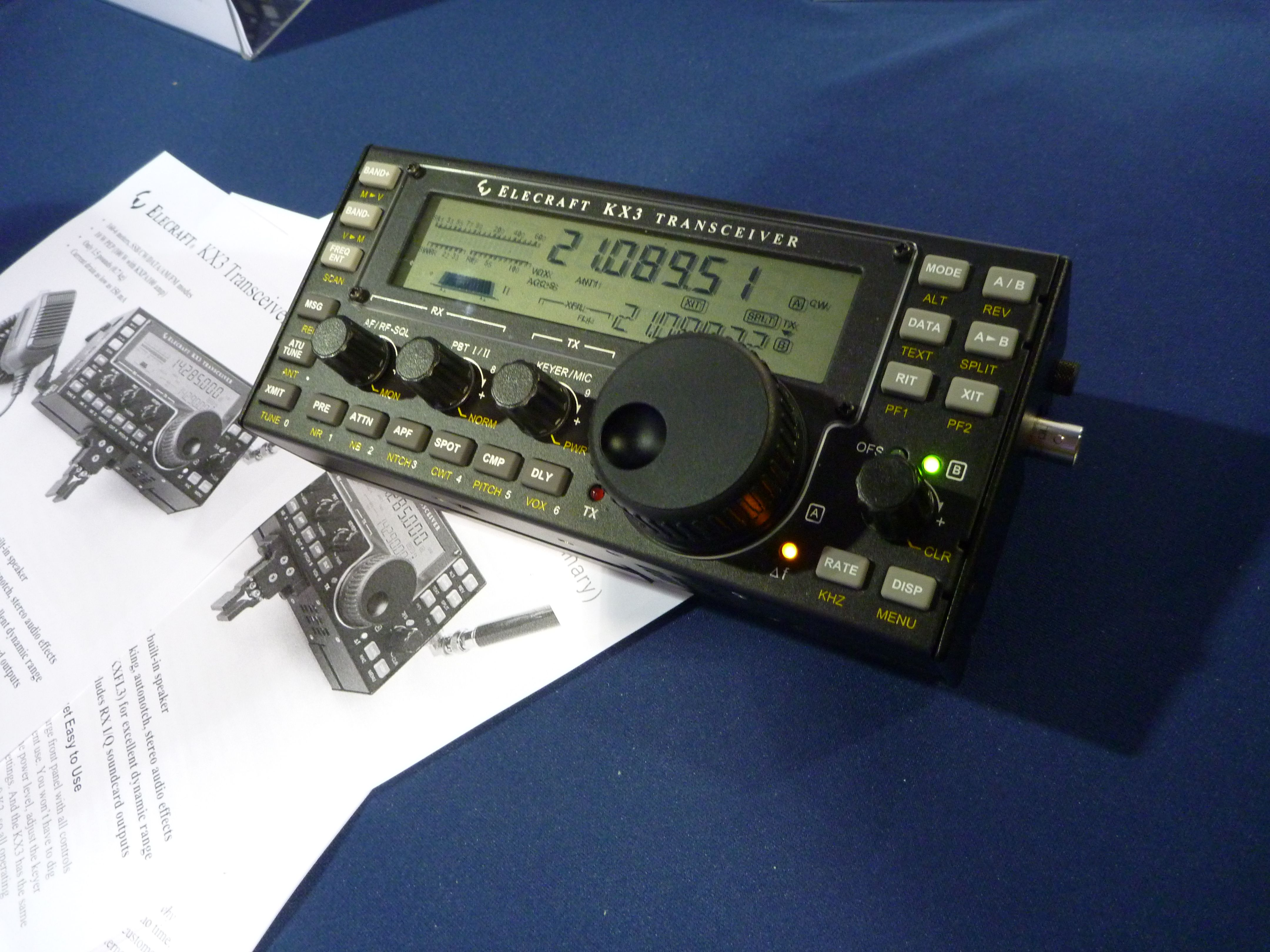
Elecraft KX3

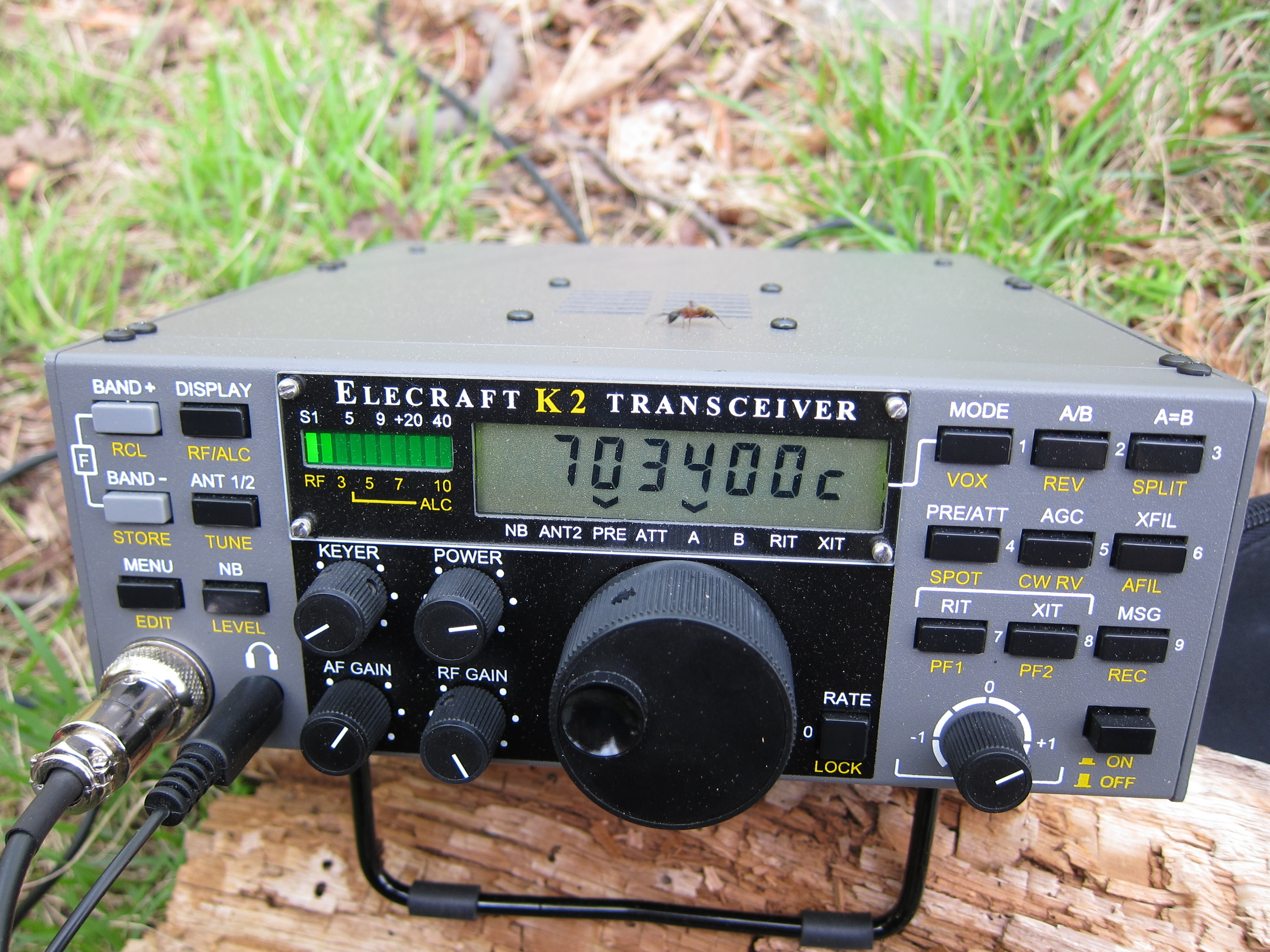
Elecraft K2

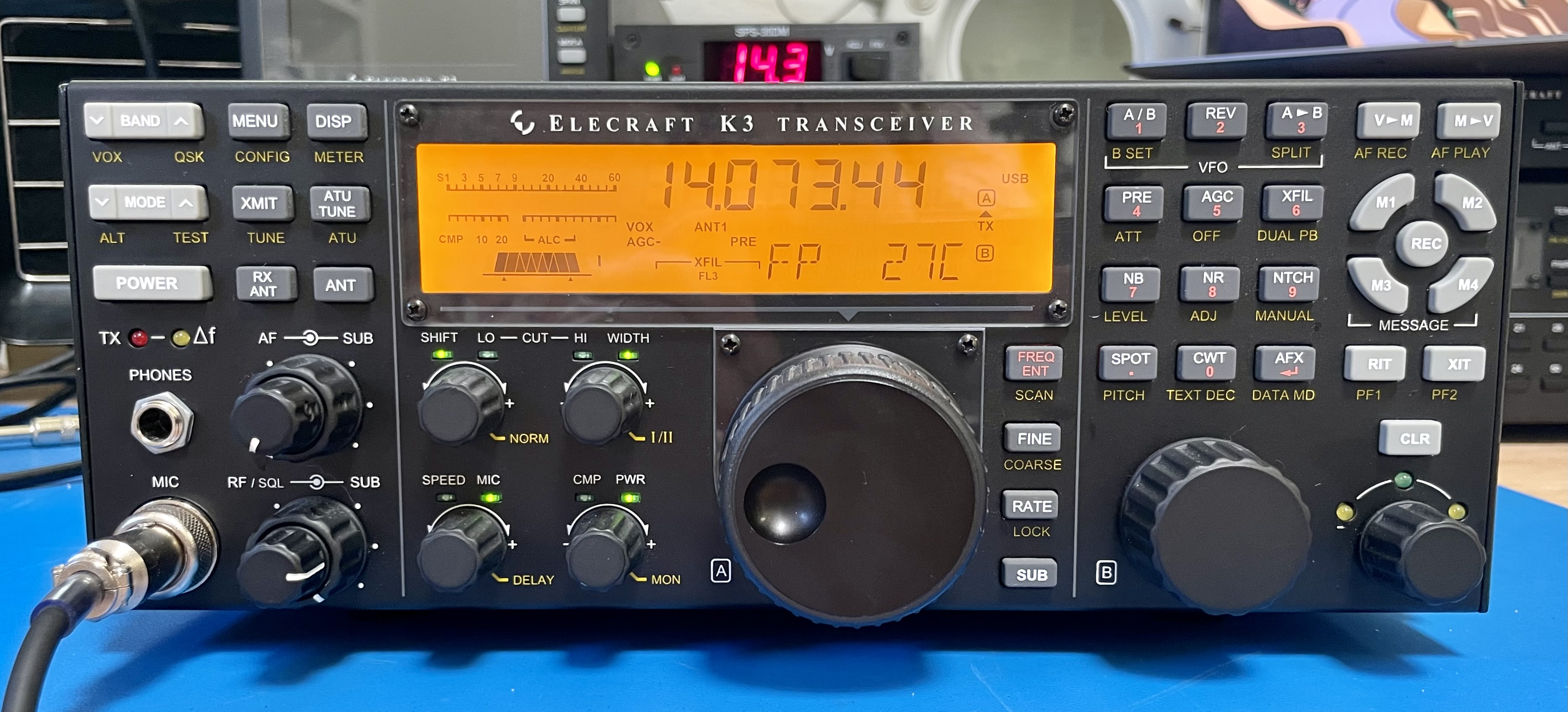
Elecraft K3

Elecraft, Inc. is an American manufacturer of amateur radio equipment and kits based in Watsonville, California. It was founded in 1998 by Wayne Burdick and Eric Swartz. The company's first product was the K2 transceiver, prototyped in October 1997.

== Products ==
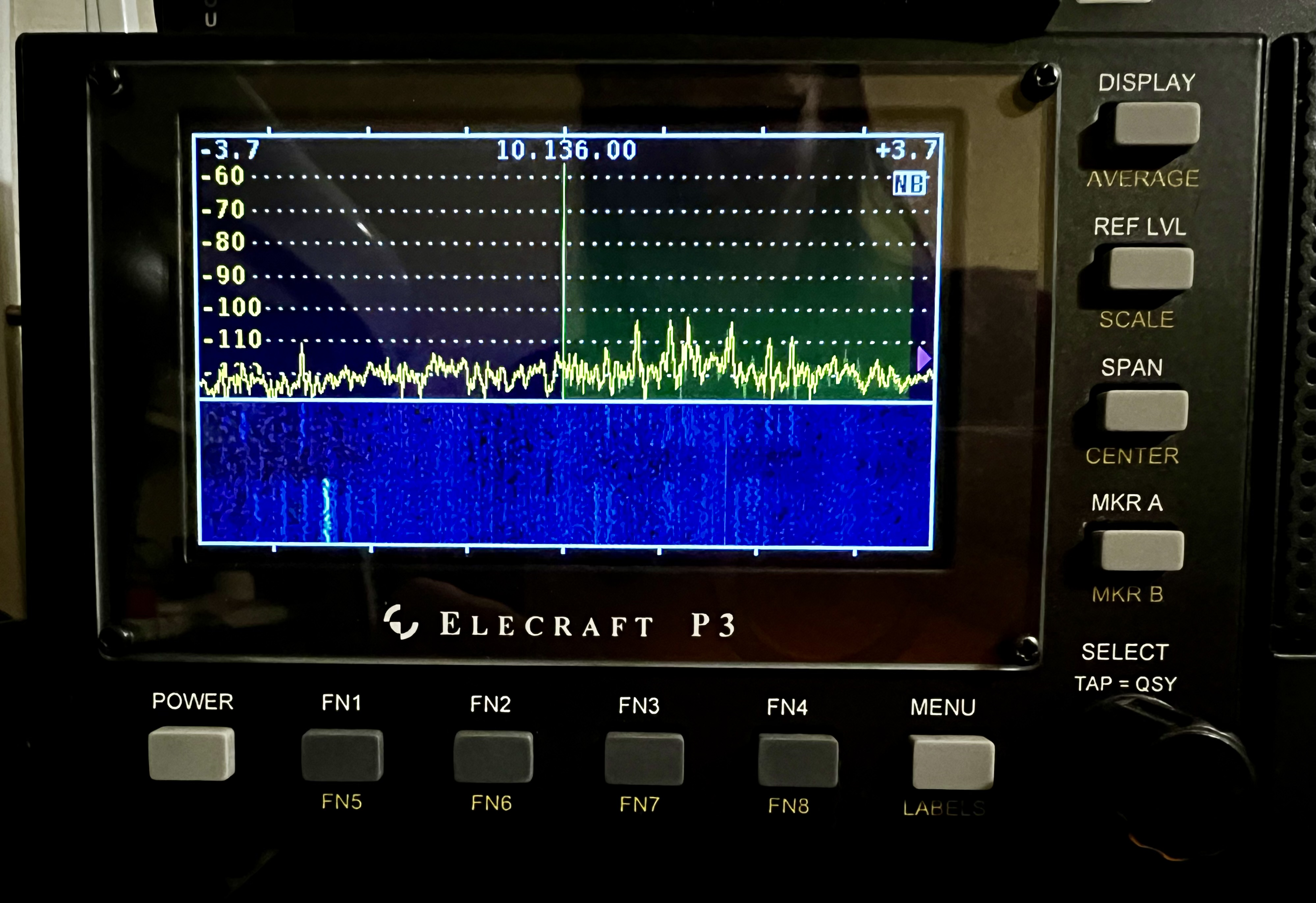
Elecraft P3 Panadapter

The company is known for the Elecraft K3 high-performance HF transceiver, a 32-bit DSP based radio covering HF plus the 6-meter VHF band and the 160-meter MF band, introduced in 2008. The K3 was well-received by the amateur radio community. At the time of its introduction, the K3 ranked highest in Sherwood Engineering's receiver tests.

Elecraft's product lineup includes QRP CW transceivers, the K2 and K3 all-mode 100W transceivers, KX2 (80m-10m) and KX3 (160m–2m) portable transceivers, linear power amplifiers, panadapters, and accessories including antenna tuners and signal generators.

Elecraft introduced "mechanical assembly only" (or "no solder") kits with the K3 line of products, allowing enthusiasts to add new electronic elements to preassembled printed circuit boards, although kit construction remained complex. Prior to the K3, models were available as solder-needed assembly kits.

The KX3 transceiver is a portable software-defined radio (SDR) transceiver with a full-featured knob-and-button interface. Although it is an SDR transceiver, it does not require a computer connection for operation.

The company's "K-Line" includes the K3 transceiver, the KPA500 500W solid-state power amplifier, the KAT500 automatic antenna tuner, and the P3 panadapter. The P3SVGA add-on for the P3 displays panadapter data on a large screen, and the W2 HF/VHF/UHF wattmeter are sometimes considered part of the K-Line. Elecraft has also introduced the "KX-Line" consisting of the KX2 and KX3 transceivers, the PX3 panadapter, and the KXPA100 100W power amplifier.

In 2015, Elecraft introduced the K3S Transceiver to replace the K3 Transceiver. The K3S features new or upgraded components, most of which can be retrofitted to older K3 models.

The K3S is currently ranked 4th in overall performance by Sherwood Engineering company.

In 2017 Elecraft introduced the KPA1500, a 1500 watt (full U.S. legal limit) amplifier. The KPA1500 covers the 160 through 6 meter bands. Its key feature is a built-in wide-range antenna tuning unit (ATU). The amplifier's power supply is housed in a separate enclosure, resulting in a relatively compact RF deck/control unit.

The K4 transceiver, successor to the K3, was first publicly displayed in 2019. Shipment was delayed due to the COVID-19 pandemic but began in early 2021. At launch, some functions were not fully implemented, and firmware updates were frequent. The K4 offers improved sound quality compared to the K3. The K4 features redesigned controls for band and mode settings, an integrated multi-band panning module (Panadapter), and touchscreen functionality.
