= List of Navtex stations =

NAVTEX (navigation telex) is an international service that provides navigational and meteorological warnings and forecasts. This list identifies some Navtex stations.

== Stations ==
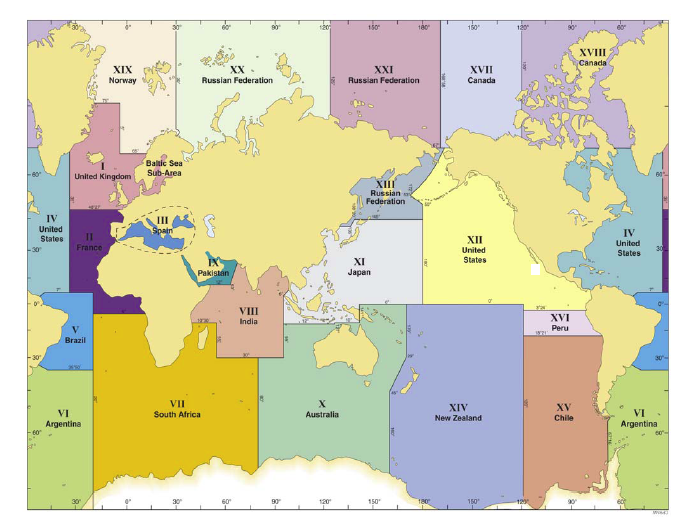
Map of the 21 NAVAREAS into which all the world's oceans are divided. Each serves to allocate responsibility for sending Marine and Safety Information (navigational warnings) to ships at sea, as part of the Global Maritime Distress and Safety System (GMDSS).

A list of Navtex stations. Please improve this list by determining the exact location of the transmission antenna!

Station broadcast ranges are in nautical miles.

== Navarea 1 – North Atlantic, North Sea, Baltic Sea ==
518 kHz (international)

ID	Station	Operator	Position	State	Transmission Times (UTC)	Range	Active
A	Svalbard	NOR	78°03′25″N 13°36′35″E	NO	00:00, 04:00, 08:00, 12:00, 16:00, 20:00	450	yes
B	Bodø	NOR	67°16′00″N 14°23′00″E	NO	00:10, 04:10, 08:10, 12:10, 16:10, 20:10	450	yes
C	Vardø	NOR	70°22′15.2″N 31°05′50.6″E	NO	00:20, 04:20, 08:20, 12:20, 16:20, 20:20	450	yes
D	Tórshavn	FRO	62°00′53.8″N 06°48′00.2″W	FR	00:30, 04:30, 08:30, 12:30, 16:30, 20:30	250	yes
E	Niton	GBR	50°35′10.67″N 01°15′17.12″W	GB-IOW	00:40, 04:40, 08:40, 12:40, 16:40, 20:40	270	yes
G	Cullercoats	GBR	55°04′23.52″N 01°27′47.64″W	GB-NTY	01:00, 05:00, 09:00, 13:00, 17:00, 21:00	270	yes
H	Bjuröklubb	SWE	64°27′41.9″N 21°35′30.6″E	SE	01:10, 05:10, 09:10, 13:10, 17:10, 21:10	300	yes
I	Grimeton	SWE	57°06′11″N 12°23′08″E	SE	01:20, 05:20, 09:20, 13:20, 17:20, 21:20	300	yes
J	Gislövshammar	SWE	55°29′20.1″N 14°18′51.2″E	SE	01:30, 05:30, 09:30, 13:30, 17:30, 21:30	300	yes
K	Niton	GBR	50°35′10.67″N 01°15′17.12″W	FR	01:40, 05:40, 09:40, 13:40, 17:40, 21:40	270	yes
L	Rogaland	NOR	58°39′31.74″N 05°36′13.6″E	NO	01:50, 05:50, 09:50, 13:50, 17:50, 21:50	450	yes
M	Jeløy	NOR	59°26′09″N 10°35′22″E	NO	02:00, 06:00, 10:00, 14:00, 18:00, 22:00	150	yes
N	Ørlandet	NOR	63°39′40.3″N 09°32′43.8″E	NO	02:10, 06:10, 10:10, 14:10, 18:10, 22:10	450	yes
O	Portpatrick	GBR	54°50′38.56″N 05°07′28.12″W	GB-DGY	02:20, 06:20, 10:20, 14:20, 18:20, 22:20	270	yes
P	Netherlands Coastguard	NLD	52°55′09.04″N 04°44′36.69″E	NL	02:30, 06:30, 10:30, 14:30, 18:30, 22:30	110	yes
Q	Malin Head	IRL	55°21′47.8″N 07°20′21.3″W	IE	02:40, 06:40, 10:40, 14:40, 18:40, 22:40	400	yes
R	Saudanes	ISL	66°11′10.5″N 18°57′6.72″W	IS	02:50, 06:50, 10:50, 14:50, 18:50, 22:50	550	yes
S	Pinneberg	DEU	53°40′24″N 09°48′31″E	DE	03:00, 07:00, 11:00, 15:00, 19:00, 23:00	300	yes
T	Oostende	BEL	51°04′53.0″N 03°20′44.70″E	BE	03:10, 07:10, 11:10, 15:10, 19:10, 23:10	55	yes
F	Tallinn	EST	59°27′51.84″N 24°21′26.26″E	EE	00:50, 04:50, 08:50, 12:50, 16:50, 20:50	250	yes
V	Oostende	BEL	51°10′56.2″N 02°48′23.54″E	BE	03:30, 07:30, 11:30, 15:30, 19:30, 23:30	55	yes
W	Valentia	IRL	51°55′47.12″N 10°20′56.5″W	IE	03:40, 07:40, 11:40, 15:40, 19:40, 23:40	400	yes
X	Grindavik	ISL	63°49′59.55″N 22°27′2.83″W	IS	03:50, 07:50, 11:50, 15:50, 19:50, 23:50	550	yes

490 kHz (national)

ID	Station	Operator	Position	State	Transmission Times (UTC)	Range	Active
B	Oostende	BE		BE	00:10, 04:10, 08:10, 12:10, 16:10, 20:10		yes
C	Portpatrick	GBR	54°50′38.56″N 05°07′28.12″W	GB-DGY	00:20, 04:20, 08:20, 12:20, 16:20, 20:20	270	yes
E	Saudanes	ISL	66°11′10.5″N 18°57′6.72″W	IS	00:40, 04:40, 08:40, 12:20, 16:40, 20:40	550	yes
I	Niton	GBR	50°35′10.67″N 01°15′17.12″W	GB-IOW	01:20, 05:20, 09:20, 13:20, 17:20, 21:20	270	yes
K	Grindavik	ISL	63°49′59.55″N 22°27′2.83″W	IS	01:40, 05:40, 09:40, 13:40, 17:40, 21:40	550	yes
L	Pinneberg	DEU	53°40′24″N 09°48′31″E	DE	01:50, 05:50, 09:50, 13:50, 17:50, 21:50	300	yes
U	Cullercoats	GBR	55°04′23.52″N 01°27′47.64″E	GB-NTY	03:20, 07:20, 11:20, 15:20, 19:20, 23:20	270	yes

== Navarea 2 – East Atlantic ==
518 kHz (international)

ID	Station	Operator	Position	Transmission times (UTC)	range	active?
A	Cross Corsen	FRA	48°28′33.71″N 05°03′13.31″W	00:00, 04:00, 08:00, 12:00, 16:00, 20:00	300	yes
D	Coruna	ESP	43°22′1.3″N 08°27′6.7″W	00:30, 04:30, 08:30, 12:30, 16:30, 20:30	400	yes
F	Horta	POR	38°31′47.54″N 28°37′44.12″W	00:50, 04:50, 08:50, 12:50, 16:50, 20:50	640	yes
G	Tarifa	ESP	36°02′31.2″N 05°33′23.78″W	01:00, 05:00, 09:00, 13:00, 17:00, 21:00	400	yes
I	Las Palmas	ESP	27°45′30.68″N 15°36′19.3″W	01:20, 05:20, 09:20, 13:20, 17:20, 21:20	400	yes
M	Casablanca	MRC	33°36′N 07°38′W	02:00, 06:00, 10:00, 14:00, 18:00, 22:00	180	no
P	Porto Santo	POR	33°03′58.6″N 16°21′19.5″W	02:30, 06:30, 10:30, 14:30, 18:30, 22:30		no
R	Monsanto	POR	38°43′53.8″N 09°11′26.2″W	02:50, 06:50, 10:50, 14:50, 18:50, 22:50	530	yes
U	Ribeira de Vinha	CPV	16°51′11.62″N 25°00′11.51″W	03:20, 07:20, 11:20, 15:20, 19:20, 23:20	250	yes
X	Cabo La Nao	ESP	38°43′23.73″N 0°09′40.92″E	03:50, 07:50, 11:50, 15:50, 19:50, 23:50		yes

490 kHz (national)

ID	Station	Operator	Position	Transmission times (UTC)	range	active?
A	Las Palmas	ESP	27°45′30.68″N 15°36′19.3″W	00:00, 04:00, 08:00, 12:00, 16:00, 20:00		yes
E	Cross Corsen	FRA	48°24′50.6″N 04°47′17″W	00:40, 04:40, 08:40, 12:40, 16:40, 20:40	300	yes
G	Monsanto	POR	38°43′53.8″N 09°11′26.2″W	01:00, 05:00, 09:00, 13:00, 17:00, 21:00	530	yes
J	Horta	POR	38°31′47.54″N 28°37′44.12″W	01:30, 05:30, 09:30, 13:30, 17:30, 21:30	640	no
M	Porto Santo	POR	33°03′58.6″N 16°21′19.5″W	02:00, 06:00, 10:00, 14:00, 18:00, 22:00		no
M	Cabo La Nao	ESP	38°43′23.73″N 0°09′40.92″E	02:00, 06:00, 10:00, 14:00, 18:00, 22:00		yes
P	São Vicente	CPV	16°51′11.62″N 25°00′11.51″W	02:30, 06:30, 10:30, 14:30, 18:30, 22:30	250	yes
T	Niton	GBR	50°34′54.61″N 01°17′41.94″W	03:10, 07:10, 11:10, 15:10, 19:10, 23:10	270	yes
T	Tarifa	ESP	36°02′31.2″N 05°33′23.78″W	03:10, 07:10, 11:10, 15:10, 19:10, 23:10		yes
W	Coruna	ESP	43°22′1.3″N 08°27′6.7″W	03:40, 07:40, 11:40, 15:40, 19:40, 23:40		yes

== Navarea 3 – Mediterranean Sea ==
518 kHz (international)

ID	Station	Operator	Position	Transmission times (UTC)	Dist	Active
A	Novorossijsk	RUS	44°35′56.8″N 37°57′5.19″E	03:00, 07:00, 11:00, 15:00, 19:00, 23:00	300	yes
B	Algiers	ALG	36°44′00″N 03°10′48″E	00:10, 02:10, ..., 22:10 (alle 2 Stunden)	150	yes
B	Kerch	RUS	45°20′50″N 36°32′40″E	01:00, 05:00, 09:00, 13:00, 17:00, 21:00	120	yes
C	Odesa	UKR	46°22′39.4″N 30°44′53.6″E	02:30, 06:30, 10:30, 14:30, 18:30, 22:30	280	yes
D	Istanbul	TUR	41°04′N 28°57′E	00:30, 04:30, 08:30, 12:30, 16:30, 20:30	250-400	yes
E	Samsun	TUR	41°23′12″N 36°11′18″E	00:40, 04:40, 08:40, 12:40, 16:40, 20:40	250-400	yes
F	Antalya	TUR	36°09′09″N 32°26′24″E	00:50, 04:50, 08:50, 12:50, 16:50, 20:50	250-400	yes
H	Iraklio	GRC	35°19′22.3″N 25°44′56.35″E	01:10, 05:10, 09:10, 13:10, 17:10, 21:10	280	yes
I	İzmir	TUR	38°16′33″N 26°16′03″E	01:20, 05:20, 09:20, 13:20, 17:20, 21:20	250-400	yes
J	Varna	BUL	43°04′05″N 27°47′10″E	01:30, 05:30, 09:30, 13:30, 17:30, 21:30	350	yes
K	Kerkyra	GRC	39°36′26″N 19°53′27″E	01:40, 05:40, 09:40, 13:40, 17:40, 21:40	280	yes
L	Limnos	GRC	39°54′23″N 25°10′53″E	01:50, 05:50, 09:50, 13:50, 17:50, 21:50	280	yes
M	Cyprus	CYP	35°02′53.8″N 33°17′1.06″E	02:00, 06:00, 10:00, 14:00, 18:00, 22:00	200	yes
N	Alexandria	EGY	31°11′53.12″N 29°51′52.18″E	02:10, 06:10, 10:10, 14:10, 18:10, 22:10	350	yes
O	Malta	MLT	35°48′54.76″N 14°31′36.88″E	02:20, 06:20, 10:20, 14:20, 18:20, 22:20	400	yes
P	Haifa	ISR	32°49′40.1″N 34°58′9.5″E	00:20, 04:20, 08:20, 12:20, 16:20, 20:20	200	yes
Q	Split	HRV	43°10′54.7″N 16°25′20.4″E	02:40, 06:40, 10:40, 14:40, 18:40, 22:40	85	yes
R	La Maddalena	ITA	41°13′22″N 9°23′56″E	02:50, 06:50, 10:50, 14:50, 18:50, 22:50	320	yes
T	Kelibia	TUN	36°48′6.55″N 11°02′14.54″E	03:10, 07:10, 11:10, 15:10, 19:10, 23:10	320	no
U	Mondolfo	ITA	43°44′52″N 13°08′30″E	03:20, 07:20, 11:20, 15:20, 19:20, 23:20	320	yes
V	Sellia Marina	ITA	38°52′23″N 16°43′11″E	03:30, 07:30, 11:30, 15:30, 19:30, 23:30	320	yes
W	Cross La Garde	FRA	43°06′15.5″N 05°59′29″E	03:40, 07:40, 11:40, 15:40, 19:40, 23:40	250	yes
X	Cabo de la Nao	ESP	38°43′23.73″N 0°09′40.92″E	03:50, 07:50, 11:50, 15:50, 19:50, 23:50	300	yes

490 kHz (national)

ID	Station	Operator	Position	Transmission times (UTC)	Dist	Active
A	Samsun	TUR	41°23′12″N 36°11′18″E	00:00, 04:00, 08:00, 12:00, 16:00, 20:00	250-400	yes
B	Istanbul	TUR	41°04′N 28°57′E	00:10, 04:10, 08:10, 12:10, 16:10, 20:10	250-400	yes
C	İzmir	TUR	38°16′33″N 26°16′03″E	00:20, 04:20, 08:20, 12:20, 16:20, 20:20	250-400	yes
D	Antalya	TUR	36°09′09″N 32°26′24″E	00:30, 04:30, 08:30, 12:30, 16:30, 20:30	250-400	yes
E	Mondolfo	ITA	43°44′52″N 13°08′30″E			yes
I	La Maddalena	ITA	41°13′22″N 9°23′56″E			yes
L	Constanța	ROU	44°06′19″N 28°37′49.4″E	01:50, 05:50, 09:50, 13:50, 17:50, 21:50	400	no
M	Cabo de la Nao	ESP	38°43′23.73″N 0°09′40.92″E	02:00, 06:00, 10:00, 14:00, 18:00, 22:00	300	yes
N	Piombino	ITA		02:10, 06:10, 10:10, 14:10, 18:10, 22:10		yes
P	Kerkyra	GRC	39°36′26″N 19°53′27″E	02:30, 06:30, 10:30, 14:30, 18:30, 22:30		yes
Q	Iraklio	GRC	35°19′22.3″N 25°44′56.35″E	02:40, 06:40, 10:40, 14:40, 18:40, 22:40		yes
R	Limnos	GRC	39°54′23″N 25°10′53″E	02:50, 06:50, 10:50, 14:50, 18:50, 22:50		yes
S	Cross La Garde	FRA	43°06′15.5″N 05°59′29″E	03:00, 07:00, 11:00, 15:00, 19:00, 23:00	250	yes
W	Sellia Marina	ITA	38°52′23″N 16°43′11″E			yes

== Navarea 4 – West Atlantic ==
518 kHz (international)

Area	kHz	ID	Station	Operator	Position	Transmission times (UTC)	range	active?
4	518	A	Miami	USA	25°37′34.41″N 80°23′0.28″W	00:00, 04:00, 08:00, 12:00, 16:00, 20:00	240	yes
4	518	B	Bermuda Harbour	BER	32°22′49.4″N 64°40′58″W	00:10, 04:10, 08:10, 12:10, 16:10, 20:10	280	yes
4	518	C	Rivière-au-Renard	CAN	50°11′42″N 66°06′35.6″W	00:20, 04:20, 08:20, 12:20, 16:20, 20:20	300	yes
4	518	E	Charleston	USA	32°50.67′N 79°57.00′W	00:40, 04:40, 08:40, 12:40, 16:40, 20:40	200	no
4	518	E	Savannah	USA	32°08′22.65″N 81°41′48.56″W	00:40, 04:40, 08:40, 12:40, 16:40, 20:40	200	no
4	518	F	Boston	USA	41°42′35.4″N 70°29′54.07″W	00:50, 04:50, 08:50, 12:50, 16:50, 20:50	200	yes
4	518	G	New Orleans	USA	29°53′4.65″N 89°56′44.2″W	01:00, 05:00, 09:00, 13:00, 17:00, 21:00	200	yes
4	518	H	Wiarton	CAN	44°56′13.6″N 81°14′0.48″W	01:10, 05:10, 09:10, 13:10, 17:10, 21:10	300	yes
4	518	H	Curacao	NLD	12°10′23.51″N 68°51′53.71″W	01:10, 05:10, 09:10, 13:10, 17:10, 21:10	400	yes
4	518	N	Portsmouth	USA	36°43′34.83″N 76°00′28.42″W	02:10, 06:10, 10:10, 14:10, 18:10, 22:10	280	yes
4	518	O	St. John's	CAN	47°36′40″N 52°40′1″W	02:20, 06:20, 10:20, 14:20, 18:20, 22:20	300	yes
4	518	P	Thunder Bay	CAN	48°33′48.65″N 88°39′22.72″W	02:30, 06:30, 10:30, 14:30, 18:30, 22:30	300	yes
4	518	Q	Sydney (Nova Scotia)	CAN	46°11′8.00″N 59°53′37.00″W	02:40, 06:40, 10:40, 14:40, 18:40, 22:40	300	yes
4	518	R	Isabela (Puerto Rico)	USA	18°28′0.06″N 67°04′18.55″W	02:50, 06:50, 10:50, 14:50, 18:50, 22:50	200	yes
4	518	T	Iqaluit	CAN	63°43′53″N 68°32′35.4″W	03:10, 07:10, 11:10, 15:10, 19:10, 23:10	300	yes
4	518	U	Saint John (Yarmouth)	CAN	43°44′39.32″N 66°07′18.43″W	03:20, 07:20, 11:20, 15:20, 19:20, 23:20	300	yes
4	518	W	Kook Island (Nuuk)	DNK	64°04′01.26″N 52°00′45.4″W	03:40, 07:40, 11:40, 15:40, 19:40, 23:40	400	yes
4	518	X	Labrador	CAN	53°42′31″N 57°01′18″W	03:50, 07:50, 11:50, 15:50, 19:50, 23:50	300	yes

490 kHz (national)

Area	kHz	ID	Station	Operator	Position	Transmission times (UTC)	range	active?
4	490	D	Rivière-au-Renard	CAN	50°11′42″N 66°06′35.6″W	00:35, 04:35, 08:35, 12:35, 16:35, 20:35	300	yes
4	490	J	Sydney (Nova Scotia)	CAN	46°11′8.00″N 59°53′37.00″W	02:55, 06:55, 10:55, 14:55, 18:55, 22:55	300	yes
4	490	S	Iqaluit	CAN	63°43′53″N 68°32′35.4″W	03:00, 07:00, 11:00, 15:00, 19:00, 23:00	300	yes
4	490	V	Yarmouth	CAN	43°44′39.32″N 66°07′18.43″W(needs region)	03:35, 07:35, 11:35, 15:35, 19:35, 23:35	300	yes

== Navarea 5 – Brasil ==
No NAVTEX stations available.

Brazil distributes its messages via Inmarsat-C.

== Navarea 6 – Argentina, Uruguay ==
518 kHz (international)

Area	kHz	ID	Station	Operator	Position	Transmission times (UTC)	range	active?
6	518	F	La Paloma	URG	34°40′S 54°09′W	00:50, 04:50, 08:50, 12:50, 16:50, 20:50	280	yes
6	518	M	Ushuaia	ARG	54°48′S 68°18′W	02:00, 06:00, 10:00, 14:00, 18:00, 22:00	280	no
6	518	N	Rio Gallegos	ARG	51°37′S 69°13′W	02:10, 06:10, 10:10, 14:10, 18:10, 22:10	280	yes
6	518	O	Comodoro Rivadavia	ARG	45°51′S 67°25′W	02:20, 06:20, 10:20, 14:20, 18:20, 22:20	280	yes
6	518	P	Bahía Blanca	ARG	38°43′S 62°06′W	02:30, 06:30, 10:30, 14:30, 18:30, 22:30	280	yes
6	518	Q	Mar del Plata	ARG	38°03′S 57°32′W	02:40, 06:40, 10:40, 14:40, 18:40, 22:40	280	yes
6	518	R	Buenos Aires	ARG	34°36′S 58°22′W	02:50, 06:50, 10:50, 14:50, 18:50, 22:50	560	yes

490 kHz (national)

Area	kHz	ID	Station	Operator	Position	Transmission times (UTC)	range	active?
6	490	A	La Paloma	URG	34°40′S 54°09′W	00:00, 04:00, 08:00, 12:00, 16:00, 20:00	280	yes
6	490	A	Ushuaia	ARG	54°48′S 68°18′W	00:00, 04:00, 08:00, 12:00, 16:00, 20:00	280	yes
6	490	B	Rio Gallegos	ARG	51°37′S 69°13′W	00:10, 04:10, 08:10, 12:10, 16:10, 20:10	280	no
6	490	C	Comodoro Rivadavia	ARG	45°51′S 67°25′W	00:20, 04:20, 08:20, 12:20, 16:20, 20:20	280	no
6	490	D	Bahía Blanca	ARG	38°43′S 62°06′W	00:30, 04:30, 08:30, 12:30, 16:30, 20:30	280	no
6	490	E	Mar del Plata	ARG	38°03′S 57°32′W	00:40, 04:40, 08:40, 12:40, 16:40, 20:40	280	no
6	490	F	Buenos Aires	ARG	34°36′S 58°22′W	00:50, 04:50, 08:50, 12:50, 16:50, 20:50	560	no

== Navarea 7 – South Africa ==
518 kHz (international)

Area	kHz	ID	Station	Operator	Position	Transmission times (UTC)	range	active?
7	518	B	Walvis Bay	NMB	23°03′23.94″S 14°37′27.6″E	00:10, 04:10, 08:10, 12:10, 16:10, 20:10	378	yes
7	518	C	Cape Town	AFS	33°41′06.46″S 18°42′46.66″E	00:20, 04:20, 08:20, 12:20, 16:20, 20:20	500	yes
7	518	I	Port Elizabeth	AFS	34°02′12.2″S 25°33′21″E	01:20, 05:20, 09:20, 13:20, 17:20, 21:20	500	yes
7	518	O	Durban	AFS	29°48′17.4″S 30°48′56.28″E	02:20, 06:20, 10:20, 14:20, 18:20, 22:20	500	yes

== Navarea 8 – India ==
518 kHz (international)

Area	kHz	ID	Station	Operator	Position	Transmission times (UTC)	range	active?
8	518	C	Mauritius	MAU	20°10′01.52″S 57°28′41.38″E	00:20, 04:20, 08:20, 12:20, 16:20, 20:20	400	yes
8	518	G	Bombay	IND	19°04′59.66″N 72°50′2.52″E	01:00, 05:00, 09:00, 13:00, 17:00, 21:00	300	yes
8	518	P	Madras	IND	13°04′58″N 80°17′14″E	02:30, 06:30, 10:30, 14:30, 18:30, 22:30	300	yes

== Navarea 9 – Arabia ==
518 kHz (international)

ID	Station	Operator	Position	State	Transmission Times (UTC)	Range	Active
A	Bushehr	IRN	28°57′44.01″N 50°49′22.06″E	IR-06	00:00, 04:00, 08:00, 12:00, 16:00, 20:00	300	yes
B	Hamala	BHR	26°09′25.8″N 50°28′35.94″E	BH	00:10, 04:10, 08:10, 12:10, 16:10, 20:10	300	yes
F	Bandar Abbas	IRN	27°09′39.68″N 56°13′31.36″E	IR-23	00:50, 04:50, 08:50, 12:50, 16:50, 20:50	300	yes
H	Jeddah	ARS	21°20′32″N 39°09′21″E	SA	01:10, 05:10, 09:10, 13:10, 17:10, 21:10	390	yes
M	Muscat	OMA	23°36′00″N 58°30′00″E	OM	02:00, 06:00, 10:00, 14:00, 18:00, 22:00	270	no
P	Karachi	PAK	24°51′07″N 67°02′33″E	PK-SD	02:30, 06:30, 10:30, 14:30, 18:30, 22:30	400	yes
V	Quseir	EGY	26°06′39.2″N 34°16′48.3″E	EG-BA	03:30, 07:30, 11:30, 15:30, 19:30, 23:30	400	yes
X	Serapeum (Ismailia)	EGY	30°28′13.12″N 32°22′00.3″E	EG-IS	03:50, 07:50, 11:50, 15:50, 19:50, 23:50	200	yes

== Navarea 10 – Australia ==
No NAVTEX stations available.

Australia distributes its messages (Maritime Safety Information — MSI) exclusively via Inmarsat-C via EGC (Enhanced Group Call) in SafetyNet.

== Navarea 11 – East Asia ==
518 kHz (international)

ID	Station	Operator	Position	Transmission times (UTC)	Active
A	Jayapura	INS	02°31′S 140°43′E	00:00, 04:00, 08:00, 12:00, 16:00, 20:00	
B	Ambon	INS	03°42′S 128°12′E	00:10, 04:10, 08:10, 12:10, 16:10, 20:10	
C	Singapore	SNG	01°20′N 103°42′E	00:20, 04:20, 08:20, 12:20, 16:20, 20:20	
D	Makassar	INS	05°06′S 119°26′E	00:30, 04:30, 08:30, 12:30, 16:30, 20:30	
E	Jakarta	INS	06°07′S 106°52′E	00:40, 04:40, 08:40, 12:40, 16:40, 20:40	
E	Hungnam	KRE	39°49′59.42″N 127°41′8.16″E		
F	Bangkok	THA	13°01′28″N 100°01′11.04″E	00:50, 04:50, 08:50, 12:50, 16:50, 20:50	
G	Naha	JPN	26°09′N 127°46′E	01:00, 05:00, 09:00, 13:00, 17:00, 21:00	
H	Moji	JPN	33°57′N 130°58′E	01:10, 05:10, 09:10, 13:10, 17:10, 21:10	
I	Puerto Princesa	PHL	09°44′N 118°43′E	01:20, 05:20, 09:20, 13:20, 17:20, 21:20	
I	Yokohama	JPN	35°26′N 139°38′E	01:20, 05:20, 09:20, 13:20, 17:20, 21:20	
J	Manila	PHL	14°35′N 121°03′E	01:30, 05:30, 09:30, 13:30, 17:30, 21:30	
J	Otaru	JPN	43°12′N 141°00′E	01:30, 05:30, 09:30, 13:30, 17:30, 21:30	
K	Davao City	PHL	07°04′N 125°36′E	01:40, 05:40, 09:40, 13:40, 17:40, 21:40	
K	Kushiro	JPN	42°59′N 144°23′E	01:40, 05:40, 09:40, 13:40, 17:40, 21:40	
L	Hongkong	HKG	22°12′33″N 114°15′22″E	01:50, 05:50, 09:50, 13:50, 17:50, 21:50	
M	Sanya	CHN	18°13′56″N 109°29′45″E	02:00, 06:00, 10:00, 14:00, 18:00, 22:00	
N	Guangzhou	CHN	23°09′N 113°29′E	02:10, 06:10, 10:10, 14:10, 18:10, 22:10	
O	Fuzhou	CHN	26°01′42.76″N 119°18′19.6″E	02:20, 06:20, 10:20, 14:20, 18:20, 22:20	
P	Da Nang	VTN	16°05′N 108°14′E	02:30, 06:30, 10:30, 14:30, 18:30, 22:30	
P	Chilung	TWN	25°09′N 121°44′E	02:30, 06:30, 10:30, 14:30, 18:30, 22:30	yes
P	Kaohsiung	TWN	22°29′N 120°25′E	02:30, 06:30, 10:30, 14:30, 18:30, 22:30	no
Q	Shanghai	CHN	31°06′32″N 121°32′39″E	02:40, 06:40, 10:40, 14:40, 18:40, 22:40	
R	Dalian	CHN	38°50′42.88″N 121°31′05″E	02:50, 06:50, 10:50, 14:50, 18:50, 22:50	
S	Sandakan	MLA	05°53′45.19″N 118°00′10.98″E	03:00, 07:00, 11:00, 15:00, 19:00, 23:00	
T	Miri	MLA	04°26′16.8″N 114°01′15.2″E	03:10, 07:10, 11:10, 15:10, 19:10, 23:10	
U	Penang	MLA	05°25′30″N 100°24′11″E	03:20, 07:20, 11:20, 15:20, 19:20, 23:20	
V	Guam	GUM	13°28′28.02″N 144°50′39.8″E	01:00, 05:00, 09:00, 13:00, 17:00, 21:00	
V	Jukbyeon	KOR	37°03′N 129°25′E	03:30, 07:30, 11:30, 15:30, 19:30, 23:30	
W	Byeonsan	KOR	35°36′N 126°29′E	03:40, 07:40, 11:40, 15:40, 19:40, 23:40	
X	Ho Chi Minh City	VTN	10°42′11.94″N 106°43′44.9″E	03:50, 07:50, 11:50, 15:50, 19:50, 23:50	

490 kHz (national)

ID	Station	Operator	Position	Transmission times (UTC)	range	active?
J	Jukbyeon	KOR	37°03′N 129°25′E	01:30, 05:30, 09:30, 13:30, 17:30, 21:30	200	yes
K	Byeonsan	KOR	35°36′N 126°29′E	01:40, 05:40, 09:40, 13:40, 17:40, 21:40	200	yes
W	Hai Phong	VTN	20°51′2.94″N 106°44′1.72″E	02:30, 06:30, 10:30, 14:30, 18:30, 22:30	400	yes

424 kHz (Transmissions in Japanese language)

ID	Station	Operator	Position	Transmission times (UTC)	range	active?
G	Naha	JPN	26°05′N 127°40′E	00:00, 04:00, 08:00, 12:00, 16:00, 20:00	400	yes
H	Moji	JPN	34°01′N 130°56′E	00:17, 04:17, 08:17, 12:17, 16:17, 20:17	400	yes
I	Yokohama	JPN	35°14′N 139°55′E	00:34, 04:34, 08:34, 12:34, 16:34, 20:34	400	yes
J	Otaru	JPN	43°19′N 140°27′E	00:51, 04:51, 08:51, 12:51, 16:51, 20:51	400	yes
K	Kushiro	JPN	42°57′N 144°36′E	01:08, 05:08, 09:08, 13:08, 17:08, 21:08	400	yes

== Navarea 12 – Eastern Pacific ==
518 kHz (international)

Area	kHz	ID	Station	Operator	Position	Transmission times (UTC)	Range	Active
12	518	C	San Francisco	USA	37°55′32.66″N 122°44′2.6″W	00:20, 04:20, 08:20, 12:20, 16:20, 20:20		
12	518	D	Prince Rupert	CAN	54°17′54.67″N 130°25′3.61″W	00:30, 04:30, 08:30, 12:30, 16:30, 20:30		
12	518	H	Tofino	CAN	48°55′31.72″N 125°32′25.1″W	01:10, 05:10, 09:10, 13:10, 17:10, 21:10		
12	518	J	Kodiak	ALS	57°46′53.78″N 152°32′15.3″W	01:30, 05:30, 09:30, 13:30, 17:30, 21:30		
12	518	L	Ayora	EQA	00°45′S 90°19′W	01:50, 05:50, 09:50, 13:50, 17:50, 21:50		
12	518	M	Guayaquil	EQA	02°17′S 80°01′W	02:00, 06:00, 10:00, 14:00, 18:00, 22:00		
12	518	O	Honolulu	HWA	21°26′13.27″N 158°08′35.66″W	02:20, 06:20, 10:20, 14:20, 18:20, 22:20		
12	518	Q	Cambria	USA	35°31′27.47″N 121°03′42.92″W	02:40, 06:40, 10:40, 14:40, 18:40, 22:40		yes
12	518	W	Astoria	USA	46°12′14.36″N 123°57′20.3″W	03:40, 07:40, 11:40, 15:40, 19:40, 23:40		
12	518	X	Kodiak	ALS	57°46′53.78″N 152°32′15.3″W	03:50, 07:50, 11:50, 15:50, 19:50, 23:50		

490 kHz (national)

Area	kHz	ID	Station	Operator	Position	Transmission times (UTC)	Range	Active
12	490	A	Ayora	EQA	00°45′S 90°19′W	00:00, 04:00, 08:00, 12:00, 16:00, 20:00		

== Navarea 13 – Russia ==
518 kHz (international)

Area	kHz	ID	Station	Operator	Position	Transmission times (UTC)	range	active?
13	518	B	Kholmsk	RUS	47°01′24.8″N 142°02′42.2″E	00:10, 04:10, 08:10, 12:10, 16:10, 20:10	300	yes
13	518	C	Murmansk	RUS	68°51′56.89″N 33°04′14.74″E	00:20, 04:20, 08:20, 12:20, 16:20, 20:20	300	yes
13	518	F	Arkhangelsk	RUS	64°33′22.6″N 40°33′0.1″E	00:50, 04:50, 08:50, 12:50, 16:50, 20:50	300	yes
13	518	C	Petropavlosk	RUS	53°14′52″N 158°25′10.1″E	00:20, 04:20, 08:20, 12:20, 16:20, 20:20	300	yes
13	518	W	Astrakhan	RUS	46°17′48.1″N 47°59′52″E	03:40, 07:40, 11:40, 15:40, 19:40, 23:40	250	yes
13	518	A	Vladivostok	RUS	43°22′53.3″N 131°53′59.5″E	00:00, 04:00, 08:00, 12:00, 16:00, 20:00	230	yes
13	518	G	Okhotsk	RUS	59°22′N 143°12′E	01:00, 05:00, 09:00, 13:00, 17:00, 21:00	300	yes
13	518	D	Magadan	RUS	59°41′N 150°09′E	00:30, 04:30, 08:30, 12:30, 16:30, 20:30	120	

== Navarea 14 – New Zealand, Southern Pacific ==
No NAVTEX stations available.

== Navarea 15 – Chile ==
518 kHz (international)

Area	kHz	ID	Station	Operator	Position	Transmission times (UTC)	Range	Active?	Language
15	518	A	Antofagasta	CHL	23°29′28.8″S 70°25′29.2″W	04:00, 12:00 20:00	300	yes	English
15	518	B	Valparaíso	CHL	32°48′08″S 71°29′06″W	04:10, 12:10, 20:10	300	yes	English
15	518	C	Talcahuano	CHL	36°42′54.2″S 73°06′28.8″W	04:20, 12:20, 20:20	300	yes	English
15	518	D	Puerto Montt	CHL	41°29′23.94″S 72°57′27.88″W	04:30, 12:30, 20:30	300	yes	English
15	518	E	Punta Arenas	CHL	52°56′53.2″S 71°03′25″W	04:40, 12:40, 20:40	300	yes	English
15	518	F	Easter Island	CHL	27°09′S 109°25′W	04:50, 12:50, 20:50	300	yes	English
15	490	G	Easter Island	CHL	27°09′S 109°25′W	00:50, 08:50, 16:50	300	yes	Spanish
15	490	H	Antofagasta	CHL	23°29′28.8″S 70°25′29.2″W	00:00, 08:00, 16:00	300	yes	Spanish
15	490	I	Valparaíso	CHL	32°48′08″S 71°29′06″W	00:10, 08:10, 16:10	300	yes	Spanish
15	490	J	Talcahuano	CHL	36°42′54.2″S 73°06′28.8″W	00:20, 08:20, 16:20	300	yes	Spanish
15	490	K	Puerto Montt	CHL	41°29′23.94″S 72°57′27.88″W	00:30, 08:30, 16:30	300	yes	Spanish
15	490	L	Punta Arenas	CHL	52°56′53.2″S 71°03′25″W	00:40, 08:40, 16:40	300	yes	Spanish

== Navarea 16 – Peru ==
518 kHz (international)

Area	kHz	ID	Station	Operator	Position	Transmission times (UTC)	range	active?
16	518.0	S	Paita	PRU	05°05′S 81°07′W	03:00, 07:00, 11:00, 15:00, 19:00, 23:00	200	yes
16	518.0	U	Callao	PRU	12°30′S 77°09′W	03:20, 07:20, 11:20, 15:20, 19:20, 23:20	200	yes
16	518.0	W	Mollendo	PRU	17°01′S 72°01′W	03:40, 07:40, 11:40, 15:40, 19:40, 23:40	200	yes

== Navtex on 4 MHz (4209.5 kHz) ==
Area	kHz	ID	Station	Operator	Position	Transmission times (UTC)	Range	Active
III	4209.5	M	Istanbul	TUR	41°04′N 28°57′E	02:00, 06:00, 10:00, 14:00, 18:00, 22:00		yes
III-IX	4209.5	X	Serapeum (Ismailia)	EGY	30°28′13.12″N 32°22′00.3″E	07:50, 11:50		yes
III	4209.5	S	Heraklion	GRC	35°19′22.3″N 25°44′56.35″E	03:00, 07:00, 11:00, 15:00, 19:00, 23:00		yes
IV	4209.5		Veracruz	MEX	19°09′N 96°07′W			no
IV	4209.5		Cozumel	MEX	20°16′N 86°44′W			no
IV	4209.5	G	New Orleans	USA	29°53′4.65″N 89°56′44.2″W	03:00, 07:00, 11:00, 15:00, 19:00, 23:00	425	yes
XI	4209.5	Q	Shanghai	CHN	31°06′32″N 121°32′39″E	18:40		yes
XI	4209.5	W	Haiphong	VTN	20°44′N 106°44′E	02:30, 06:30, 10:30, 14:30, 18:30, 22:30		yes
XII	4209.5		La Paz	MEX	24°08′N 110°17′W			no
XII	4209.5		Manzanillo	MEX	19°05′N 104°18′W			no
XII	4209.5		Salina Cruz	MEX	16°09′N 95°12′W			no
