= Isfjord Radio =

- Radio station
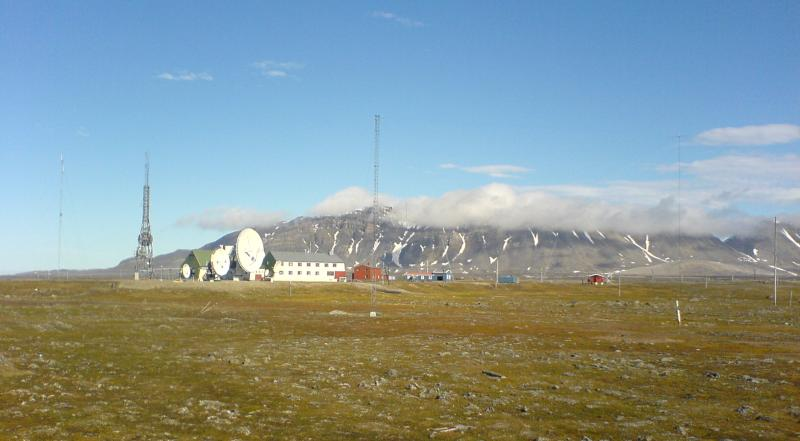

- Location within Svalbard
- Coordinates: 78°03′08″N 13°36′04″E
- Country: Norway
- Region: Svalbard
- Island: Spitsbergen
- Land area: Nordenskiöld Land
- Established: 13 November 1933
- Founder: Norwegian Polar Institute

Population
  - Total: 0
- Time zone: UTC+1 (Central European Time)
  - Summer (DST): UTC+2 (Central European Summer Time)
- Postal code: 9172
- Postal place: Isfjord på Svalbard

Isfjord Radio is a coast radio station, weather station and hotel located at Kapp Linné on the island Spitsbergen in Svalbard, Norway. The station was established in 1933, and has played an important role in the telecommunications between the Svalbard archipelago and the outside world. The station was destroyed by both sides during World War II, and rebuilt in 1946. The station was important for ships traffic and air traffic. Satellite communications were established in 1979, but deprecated when a fiber optic cable between Svalbard and the mainland was finished in 2004. Isfjord Radio was automated and depopulated in 1999. Parts of the outdated installations have been preserved as a historical site.

== History ==
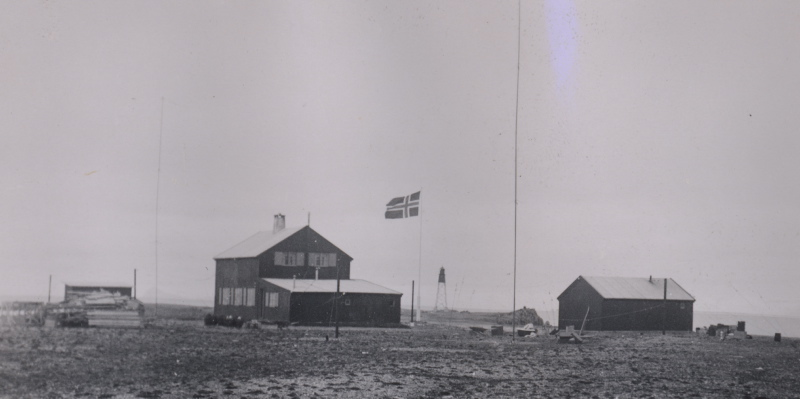
Isfjord Radio in 1933

During the early 1930s there were two main coast radio stations in Svalbard: Svalbard Radio in Longyearbyen and Barentsburg Radio. Ship traffic for export of coal increased during the period, but neither of the coast radio stations had good coverage and in 1932 there were two Soviet ships which went aground. Arktikugol took initiative to better the navigational aids in Isfjorden, including a better location for a coast radio station. Planning was carried out between the Lighthouse and Buoy Authority, the Telegraphy Administration, the Ministry of Trade and Industry and the Norwegian Polar Institute, resulting in Kapp Linné being proposed as a suitable location for a radio station. The plans were approved by Parliament on 16 May 1933, along with a grant of 100,000 Norwegian krone (NOK). On 19 June Parliament allocated additional spending to purchase the land Russekeila from Arthur S. Lewin.

The Polar Institute was responsible for planning the building and appointed Anders Kristian Orvin to be in charge. The Telegraphy Administration was responsible for the technical equipment. The transmission and lighthouse equipment was shipped from Oslo on 24 June, arrived 8 July and was unloaded by 13 July. Construction was carried out by twelve men, working eleven-hour shifts, allowing completion on 13 September. The work included a radio transmitter, three buildings, a boathouse, a forge, a slipway and three lighthouses—at Kapp Linné, Festningen and Vestpynten. The main building was 63 square meters (680 sq ft), with the smaller buildings being 47 and 38 square meters (510 and 410 sq ft). The transmitter was a Telefunken telegraphy and telephony transmitter with a 300-watt capacity. It was decided that support for radio bearing would not be installed, as it would cost NOK 5,000. The station opened on 13 November 1933; at first it had three employees, later four. The crew were hired for one year at a time, with the telegraphist normally taking over the role as manager the following year. A fatal accident occurred on 10 October 1939, when Ole Sivertsen was hit in the head by a crank which had loosened from a crane.

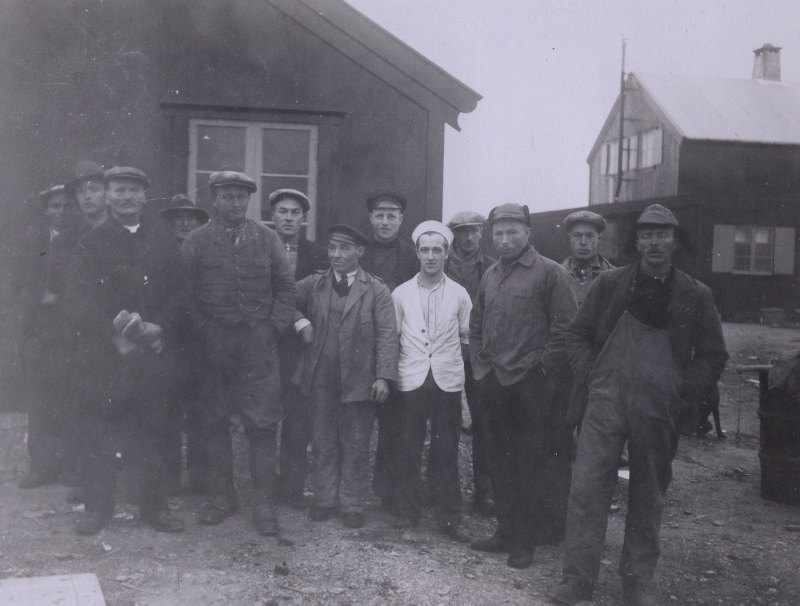
The crew which built the station in 1933

Ingøy Radio was bombed by the German Luftwaffe on 6 June 1940 during World War II. The Norwegian population on Svalbard was evacuated to Scotland on 3 September 1941. To avoid the infrastructure coming into the hands of Germany, Isfjord Radio and other radio stations were destroyed prior to the evacuation. The German battleship Tirpitz bombarded Isfjord Radio on 8 September 1943 as part of Operation Zitronella, as the Kriegsmarine did not know if the station was operative or not.

Planning of the reestablishment of Isfjord Radio started in 1945, following requests from the Polar Institute and the Norwegian Meteorological Institute to the Ministry of Trade and Industry. The Polar Institute was given the responsibility for building the station, while the Telegraphy Administration was given the responsibility for the technical equipment. Transport of equipment started on 29 June 1946 and arrived at Kapp Linné on 11 July. Construction started on 15 July and was at first led by Gunnar Horn; he died after only a few days and the work was subsequently led by Reidar Lyngaas. Twenty-seven men worked on the construction, of which nineteen lived in a barracks and the rest in tents. Seven soldiers and a Jeep were used to dig down 7.5 kilometers (4.7 mi) of cable. The main building was a copy of the pre-war building and was built on the foundation, which had survived the war. It was supplemented with a radio building and a barracks for 21 people. The slipway and boathouse survived the war. The new station was equipped with radio bearing.

Following two ships running aground at the mouth of Isfjorden in 1949, demands were raised for Isfjord Radio to be equipped with radar. Neither vessel had been equipped with this and it was argued that a radio at Isfjord Radio could be used to aid vessels traveling up the fjord. Parliament granted funding and the radar was installed upon a 20-meter (66 ft) tall mast at the station in 1950. It remained in use until 1968. Trans-polar flights between Europe and North America started in 1955 and needed to use Isfjord Radio as a navigational aid. The International Geophysical Year of 1956–57 saw increased activity in Svalbard and also increased communication over Isfjord Radio. These required an increased staffing and expansion of the station. The technical part of the main building was completed in the fall of 1956, allowing the station's staff to increase to five. The residential part was completed the following year, allowing the staff to increase to eleven. The number of telegraphists increased from four to five in 1959. The operation of radiosondes every six hours for meteorological surveys continued until 1960, after which the staff was reduced to eight.

Map of Isfjord Radio and the surrounding area

At first the Norwegian Broadcasting Corporation's (NRK) radio broadcast was sent to Svalbard Radio and broadcast as medium wave. NRK was not satisfied with the quality and in 1969 started planning a better transmission system. They concluded that it would be necessary to build a microwave radio relay between Isfjord Radio and Svalbard Radio. As a temporary solution, a reception antenna was built at Kapp Linné and a reception antenna in Longyearbyen. Construction of the relay was approved in 1972 and carried out the following year. A reflector was built on Sokolovfjellet and the system had a capacity for 120 lines. The reflector blew down in a storm on 5 March 1976, and a temporary connection with four lines could not be reestablished until 1 April. Sokolovfjellet was considered unsuitable and the reflector was instead installed at Kapp Starostin. Because of the size of the reflector it could not be flown up and not until the summer could the relay be re-established. However, delays resulted in that installation had to wait until May 1977. The coast radio station was unmanned in 1976 and remotely controlled from Svalbard Radio, which had moved to the tower at Svalbard Airport, Longyear.

Planning of a satellite connection to Svalbard had its background in the need for satellite communication with oil platforms in the North Sea via Intelsat. This work had commenced in 1972 and resulted two years later in Norway receiving four concessions to operate smaller than normal receives. Trials with satellite communications were carried out for two weeks during 1974. A 3-meter (9.8 ft) antenna was installed and was able to connect with Intelsat IV. The success resulted in demands from the local population that the service become permanent and connected to the telephone system in Longyearbyen. Additional tests were necessary an experimental receiver, used to measure reception from several satellites, was installed at Isfjord Radio in 1976. Norway Telecom signed an agreement with Nera in May 1978 to build a permanent earth station at Isfjord Radio. The equipment arrived on 1 July 1979, and the 13-meter (43 ft) parabolic antenna was taken into use on 19 December.

A proposal to use Isfjord Radio for accommodation was first put forward in 1992. The idea was reconsidered in 1995, this time the idea was approved. The service was introduced the following year. It is only feasible to operate during the winter season, as transport has to take place on snowmobile. The service was at first provided by Telenor Svalbard, but from 1999 it was taken over by Svalbard Polar Travel.

== Station ==
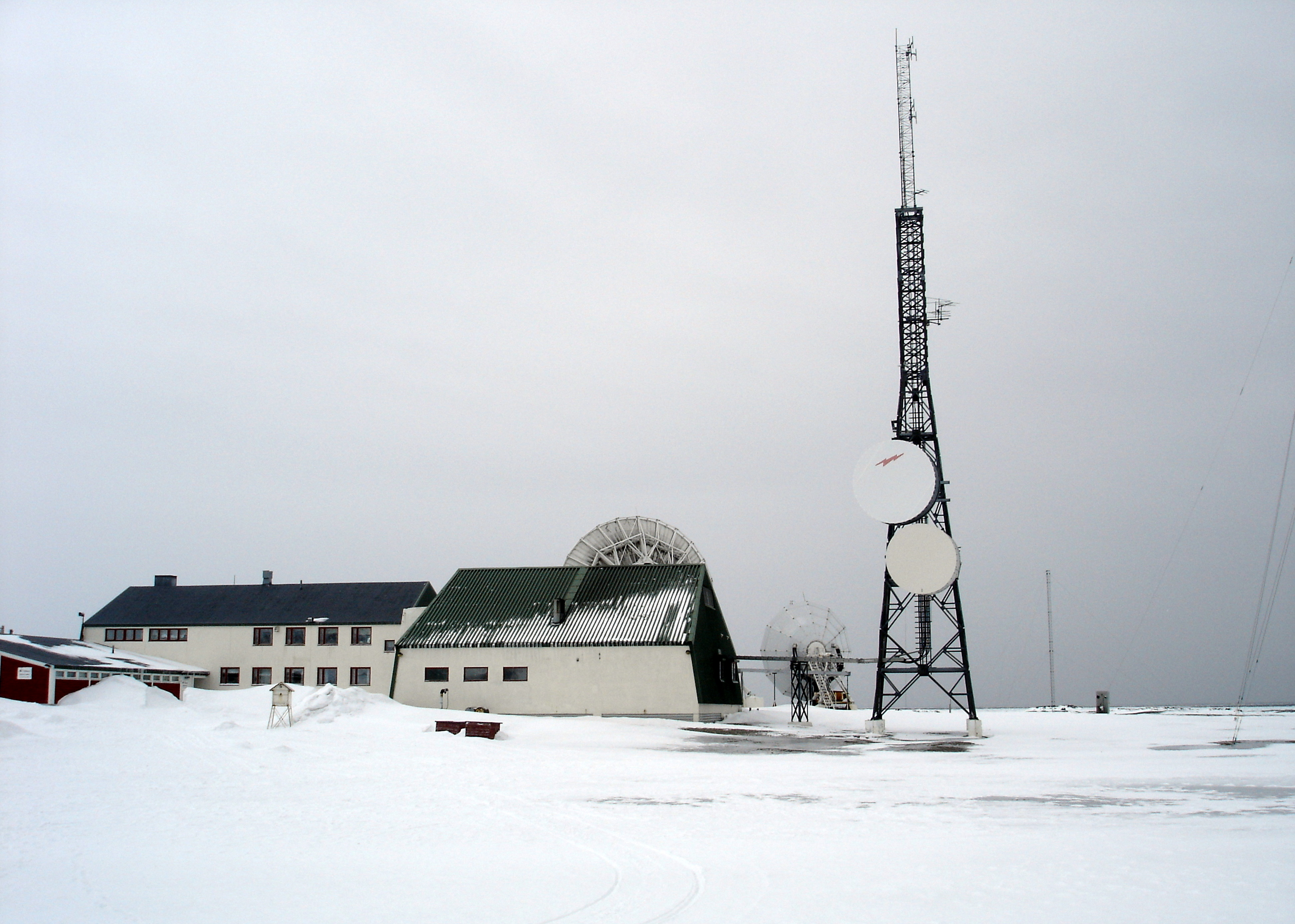
The station

Telenor Maritim Radio operates a marine VHF radio transmitter at Isfjord Radio, which is remotely operated from Bodø Radio. The station is diesel-powered by 200 tonnes/year. In 2012 many tonnes of diesel leaked into the surrounding area. In 2023 220 kW solar panels were installed, providing 130 MWh during the Arctic summer when 24-hour sunlight is present.

== Climate ==
Isfjord Radio has a tundra climate (Köppen climate classification ET). The average annual temperature in Isfjord Radio is −4.7 °C (23.5 °F). The average annual rainfall is 438.3 mm (17.26 in) with September as the wettest month. The temperatures are highest on average in July, at around 5.0 °C (41.0 °F), and lowest in February, at around −12.1 °C (10.2 °F). The highest temperature ever recorded in Isfjord Radio was 17.0 °C (62.6 °F) on 27 July 1966; the coldest temperature ever recorded was −33.5 °C (−28.3 °F) on 17 December 1968.

Climate data for Isfjord Radio (1912−2005)
Month	Jan	Feb	Mar	Apr	May	Jun	Jul	Aug	Sep	Oct	Nov	Dec	Year
Record high °C (°F)	4.6 (40.3)	3.3 (37.9)	3.9 (39.0)	4.5 (40.1)	13.1 (55.6)	12.3 (54.1)	17.0 (62.6)	14.3 (57.7)	12.0 (53.6)	8.5 (47.3)	12.3 (54.1)	4.4 (39.9)	17.0 (62.6)
Mean maximum °C (°F)	0.8 (33.4)	0.3 (32.5)	0.2 (32.4)	0.7 (33.3)	4.0 (39.2)	7.7 (45.9)	11.7 (53.1)	10.2 (50.4)	7.1 (44.8)	4.3 (39.7)	2.4 (36.3)	1.2 (34.2)	12.4 (54.3)
Mean daily maximum °C (°F)	−8.7 (16.3)	−9.1 (15.6)	−9.1 (15.6)	−6.7 (19.9)	−1.5 (29.3)	3.3 (37.9)	6.6 (43.9)	5.9 (42.6)	2.4 (36.3)	−1.9 (28.6)	−5.1 (22.8)	−7.3 (18.9)	−2.6 (27.3)
Daily mean °C (°F)	−11.5 (11.3)	−12.1 (10.2)	−12.0 (10.4)	−9.2 (15.4)	−3.2 (26.2)	1.8 (35.2)	5.0 (41.0)	4.4 (39.9)	1.0 (33.8)	−3.8 (25.2)	−7.4 (18.7)	−10.0 (14.0)	−4.7 (23.4)
Mean daily minimum °C (°F)	−14.3 (6.3)	−15.1 (4.8)	−14.9 (5.2)	−11.6 (11.1)	−4.9 (23.2)	0.4 (32.7)	3.4 (38.1)	3.0 (37.4)	−0.4 (31.3)	−5.6 (21.9)	−9.8 (14.4)	−12.6 (9.3)	−6.9 (19.6)
Mean minimum °C (°F)	−23.6 (−10.5)	−24.8 (−12.6)	−24.0 (−11.2)	−20.9 (−5.6)	−12.0 (10.4)	−3.3 (26.1)	1.1 (34.0)	0.0 (32.0)	−5.0 (23.0)	−12.8 (9.0)	−17.8 (0.0)	−22.0 (−7.6)	−27.2 (−17.0)
Record low °C (°F)	−32.0 (−25.6)	−32.2 (−26.0)	−32.3 (−26.1)	−28.2 (−18.8)	−19.6 (−3.3)	−8.2 (17.2)	−0.5 (31.1)	−2.3 (27.9)	−10.8 (12.6)	−23.6 (−10.5)	−26.7 (−16.1)	−33.5 (−28.3)	−33.5 (−28.3)
Average precipitation mm (inches)	36.9 (1.45)	35.2 (1.39)	37.3 (1.47)	23.9 (0.94)	23.0 (0.91)	30.0 (1.18)	38.5 (1.52)	46.2 (1.82)	47.0 (1.85)	38.2 (1.50)	42.9 (1.69)	40.2 (1.58)	438.3 (17.26)
Average precipitation days (≥ 0.1 mm)	13.38	12.62	14.10	10.76	12.10	12.43	15.25	15.05	15.10	14.65	12.75	13.55	161.15
Mean monthly sunshine hours	0.0	0.8	68.3	203.3	232.0	164.9	141.6	124.3	56.0	14.2	0.0	0.0	1,000.9
Source: Météo Climat
