= Telenor (disambiguation) =

Telenor may refer to:

- Telenor, a Norwegian telecommunications company
  - Telenor Arena, a multi-purpose indoor arena in Norway, sponsored by Telenor
  - Telenor Arena Karlskrona, a multi-purpose sporting arena in Sweden, sponsored by Telenor
  - Nykøbing Falster Idrætspark, a stadium previous named Telenor Arena, sponsored by Telenor, between July 2012 and July 2014
  - Telenor Avidi, former subsidiary of Telenor
  - Telenor Maritim Radio, a maritime telecommunication services company owned by Telenor
  - Telenor Bulgaria, a former subsidiary of Telenor
  - Telenor Denmark, a subsidiary of Telenor
  - Telenor Hungary, a former subsidiary of Telenor
  - Telenor India, a subsidiary of Telenor
  - Telenor Montenegro, a former subsidiary of Telenor
  - Telenor Myanmar, a subsidiary of Telenor
  - Telenor Pakistan, a subsidiary of Telenor
  - Telenor Serbia, a former subsidiary of Telenor
  - Telenor Sverige, a subsidiary of Telenor
