= Ørlandet Radio =

Coast radio station in Norway

Coordinates: 63°39′41″N 9°32′48″E

Ørlandet Radio (Norwegian: Ørlandet radio; callsign LFO) is a coast radio station in Ørland Municipality, Norway. Operated by Telenor Maritime Radio, it is remotely controlled from Florø Radio. The station is still used for transmission of marine VHF radio, medium frequency and Navtex. The station was built by the Wehrmacht during the Second World War. Florø Radio took over operations in 2004.
