= World-Wide Navigational Warning Service =

Global radio warning system for shipping

The World-Wide Navigational Warning Service (WWNWS) is a radio system set up by the International Hydrographic Organization (IHO) which provides hazard warnings to maritime shipping. Upon the onset of a meteorological or geological disaster that would pose a danger to shipping lanes, warnings are issued within affected NAVAREAs (designated navigational areas in the WWNWS) by the state responsible for that area.

== History ==
Historically, navigational warnings were sometimes issued by individual states. Where they were issued, they were often limited to national waters, and there was no standard language or standard method of coordination between states. The sinking of the MS Brandenburg in the English Channel on 12 January 1971 prompted discussion on a better system to warn ships of navigational hazards.

A 1972 conference of the International Hydrographic Organization (IHO) produced a recommendation to produce a "global radio navigational warning service". A joint body was set up by the IHO and the International Maritime Organization (IMO) in 1973. In 1974 the project became the sole responsibility of the IHO, with the IMO withdrawing from non-UN cooperation. Development initially focused on warnings for international waters. Coastal and Local warnings were developed later, incorporating lessons from the coastal warning system covering the English Channel and North Sea, and the coastal warning system covering the Baltic Sea. The division of the world into NAVAREAs was an early decision, with an initial 15 areas proposed in 1973 being expanded to 16 at the first IHO Commission meeting in 1974.

Established in 1977 to provide notice of temporary hazards to international shipping. The 16 initial NAVAREAS each began operating when individually ready, and the system became fully operational on 1 April 1980 when Japan began broadcasting to cover its NAVAREA. (The NAVAREA in question, XI, was the only one not assigned a potential Area Coordinator in the 1974 and 1975 planning meetings.)

Five NAVAREAs covering the Arctic Ocean were established in 2007.

== System ==
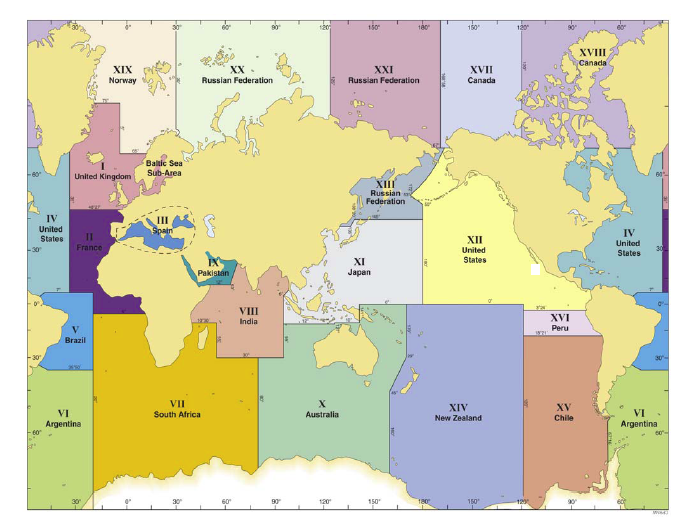
The world's ocean is divided into 21 NAVAREAs, each of which has one Area Coordinator.

Warnings are sent using methods such as NAVTEX and Inmarsat-C. Once a warning is no longer relevant, the notice is cancelled. Longer-term hazards are converted into a notice to mariners.

The highest level of warning is a Navigational Area (NAVAREA) warning. There are also Sub-Area warnings, Coastal warnings, and Local warnings. NAVAREA, Sub-Area, and Coastal warnings are regulated by the WWNWS, and the level of warning determines the area it will be broadcast in. Local warnings, not regulated by the WWNWS, are generally restricted to in-shore areas. A broadcast applicable to an entire NAVAREA is also extended 700 miles (1,100 km) beyond it, to alert incoming shipping.

The world's oceans are divided into 21 NAVAREAs, and warnings are given within each region. Each NAVAREA has an Area Coordinator, which will be a designated national body. Some bodies are responsible for multiple NAVAREAs. National Coordinators of other coastal states provide information to the Area Coordinator. Warnings are given in English, sometimes accompanied by another language.

== See also ==
- List of Navtex stations
- Global Maritime Distress and Safety System
