= CCIR 476 =

Character encoding used in radio data protocols

CCIR 476 is a character encoding used in radio data protocols such as SITOR, AMTOR and Navtex. It is a recasting of the ITA2 character encoding, known as Baudot code, from a five-bit code to a seven-bit code. In each character, exactly four of the seven bits are mark bits, and the other three are space bits. This allows for the detection of single-bit errors.

== Technical details ==
The number of possible valid binary code values in CCIR 476 is the number of ways to choose 4 marks for 7 bit positions, and the number can be calculated using the binomial coefficient: $\ \textstyle \binom{7}{3} = \binom{7}{4} = 35\ .$ Thus CCIR 476 has 3 additional code points available over ITA2's 32 code points.

The SITOR protocol uses the additional three code points (denoted as SIA, SIB and RPT below) for idle, phasing, and repeat requests. In addition, some of the ordinary characters are reused as control signals.

== Character set ==
In these tables, the hexadecimal code values are converted from a binary representation, with 1 being mark, 0 being space, and the most significant bit given first. The international version of ITA2 is used here; note also the added non-ITA2 codes SIA, SIB and RPT, used by SITOR.

CCIR 476 (Letter set)
| | 0 | 1 | 2 | 3 | 4 | 5 | 6 | 7 | 8 | 9 | A | B | C | D | E | F |
| 0x | | | | | | | | | | | | | | | | SIA |
| 1x | | | | | | | | J | | | | F | | C | K | |
| 2x | | | | | | | | W | | | | Y | | P | Q | |
| 3x | | | | SIB | | G | FIGS | | | M | X | | V | | | |
| 4x | | | | | | | | A | | | | S | | I | U | |
| 5x | | | | D | | R | E | | | N | LTRS | | SP | | | |
| 6x | | | | Z | | L | RPT | | | H | BLK | | LF | | | |
| 7x | | O | B | | T | | | | CR | | | | | | | |

CCIR 476 (Figure set)
| | 0 | 1 | 2 | 3 | 4 | 5 | 6 | 7 | 8 | 9 | A | B | C | D | E | F |
| 0x | | | | | | | | | | | | | | | | SIA |
| 1x | | | | | | | | BEL | | | | ! | | : | ( | |
| 2x | | | | | | | | 2 | | | | 6 | | 0 | 1 | |
| 3x | | | | SIB | | & | FIGS | | | . | / | | = | | | |
| 4x | | | | | | | | - | | | | ' | | 8 | 7 | |
| 5x | | | | ENQ | | 4 | 3 | | | , | LTRS | | SP | | | |
| 6x | | | | + | | ) | RPT | | | £ | BLK | | LF | | | |
| 7x | | 9 | ? | | 5 | | | | CR | | | | | | | |
