= Finneset =

Peninsula in Svalbard, Norway

Coordinates: 78°2′0″N 14°14′5″E

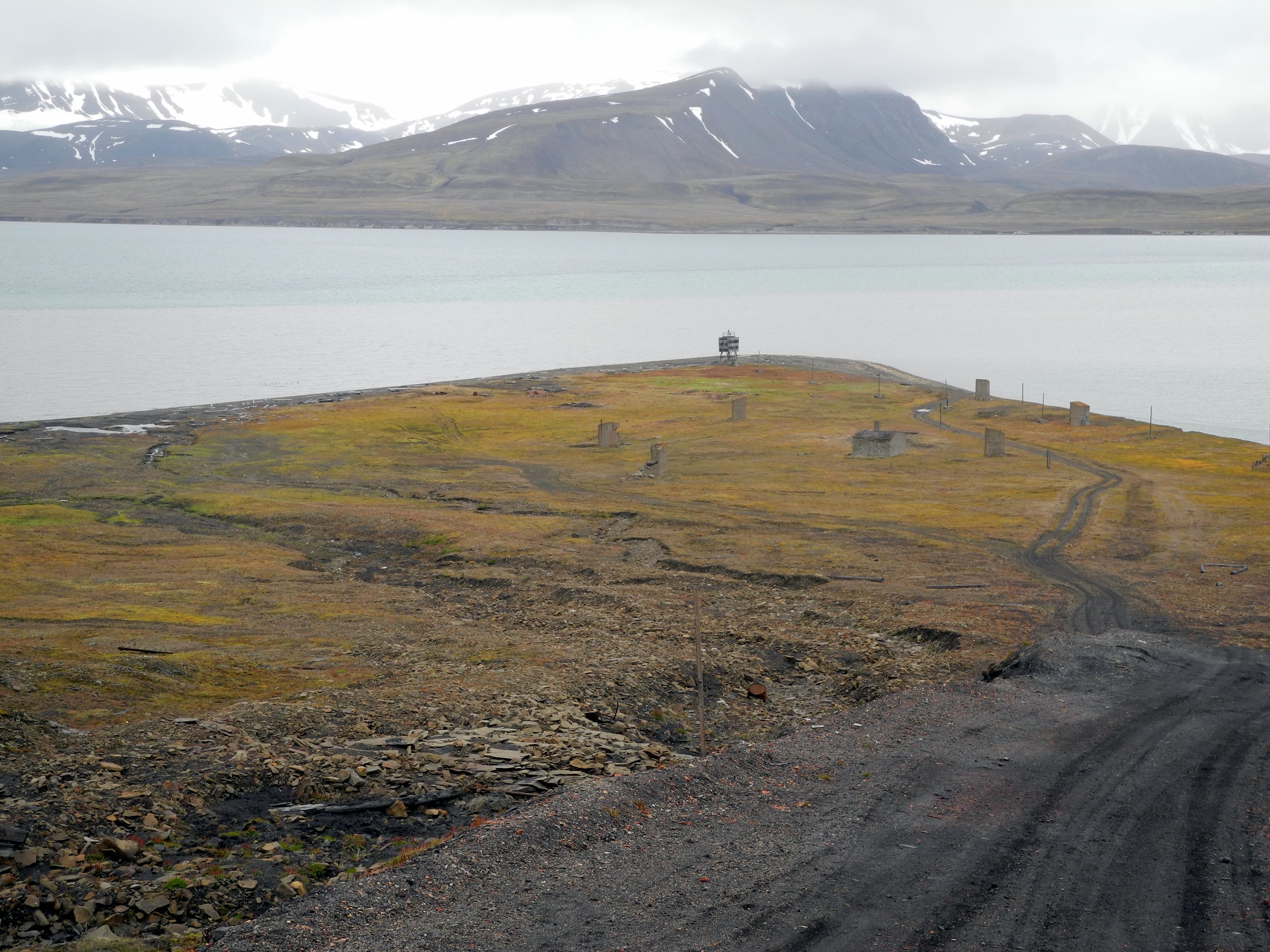
Finneset viewed from the land side

Finneset is a peninsula located on the east side of Grønfjorden on Spitsbergen in Svalbard, Norway. It is located 2 kilometers (1.2 mi) south of Barentsburg. A whaling station was located there until 1905. From 1911 it became the site of the first wireless station in the Arctic, named Svalbard Radio from 19 September 1925. It was also a meteorological station operated by the Norwegian Meteorological Institute. Both services moved to Longyearbyen on 1 September 1930. It is named for being a fine place to land a ship.
