= Jeløy Radio =

Radio station in Norway

Coordinates: 59.4367°N 10.5944°E

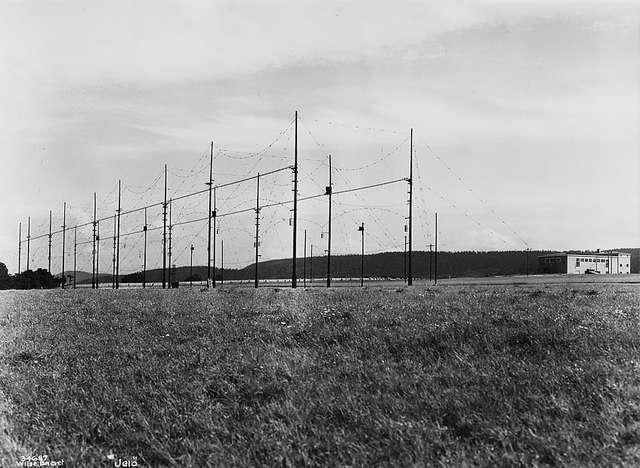
Jeløy Radio in 1929

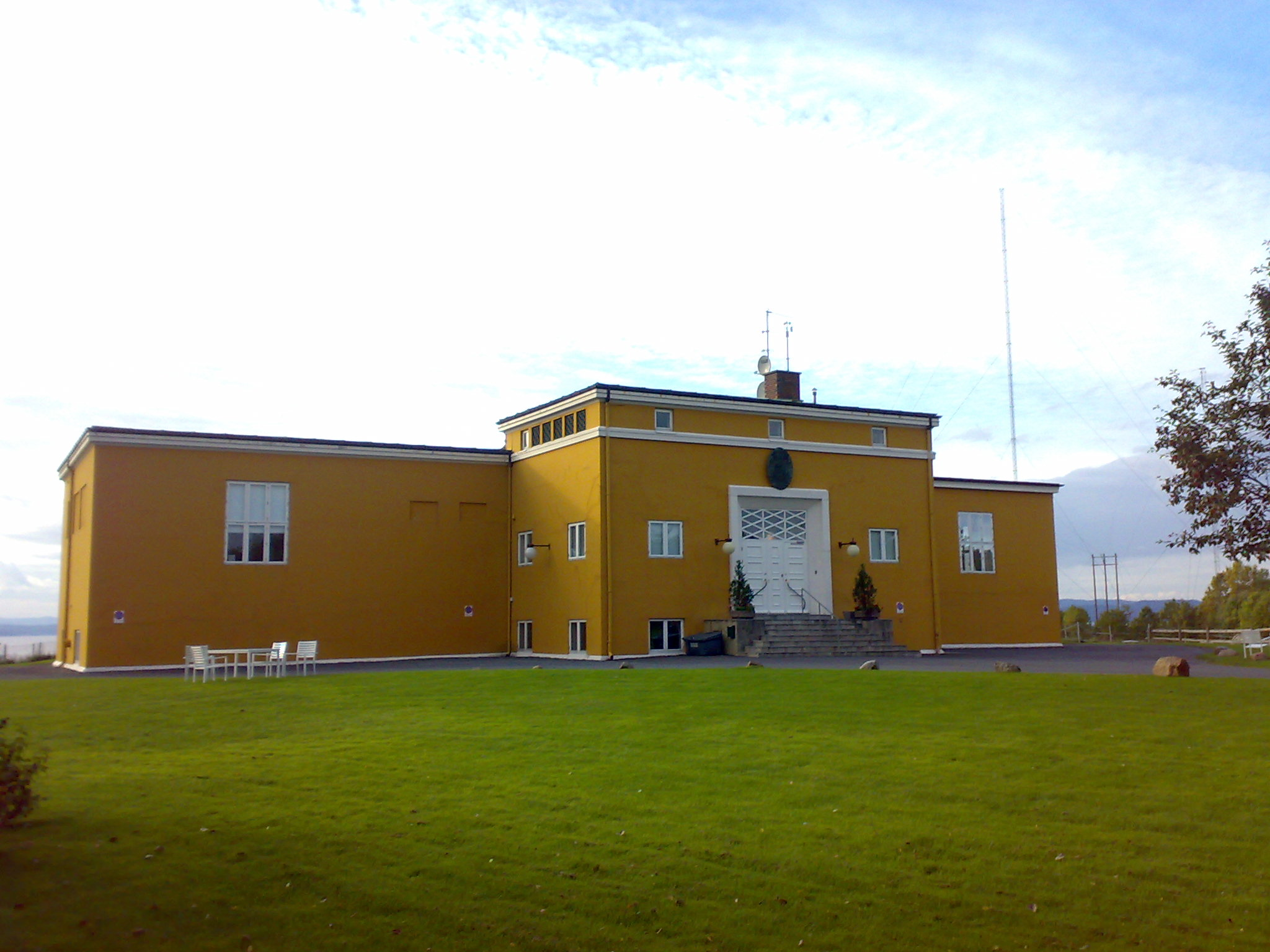
The main building, since 1997 operating as a hotel

Jeløy Radio (Norwegian: Jeløy radio) is a radio station situated on the peninsula of Jeløya in Moss Municipality in Østfold county, Norway. It currently only operates as an unstaffed coast radio station operating marine VHF radio connected to Tjøme Radio and a Navtex service operated from Vardø Vessel Traffic Service Centre.

== History ==
The Royal Norwegian Navy was the first user of wireless telegraphy in Norway, when they purchased two Slaby–Arco units in 1901. They were installed on Eidsvold and Frithjof and tested the equipment out of the main base, Karljohansvern. Tests the first year failed to reach Færder Lighthouse, but when moved to Jeløya and the equipment recalibrated the following summer, the tests were successful. Additional sets were installed, especially after wireless telegraphy's successfully implementation in the Japanese Navy during the 1904–05 Russo-Japanese War. The Ministry of Defence approved the construction of two radio stations, Tjøme Radio near Tønsberg and Flekkerøy Radio near Kristiansand, in 1905.

Plans for a direct connection between Scandinavia and the United States was launched in 1910. This resulted in the opening of Stavanger Radio in 1919. The spark-gap transmitter created interference with other American radio stations and was soon out of date. A new NOK 1.5-million vacuum tube transmitter was installed in 1922 and the receiver station, originally at Nærbø, was moved to Fornebu in 1925. Stavanger Radio was a nuisance for US East Coast radio operations, often creating interference.

The 1930 opening of a vacuum tube transmitter allowed for the closing of Stavanger Radio. The station was staffed from Oslo. A one-kilowatt shortwave broadcasting transmitter for radio was built at Jeløy in 1934. This was used to send radio broadcasts to Vadsø, where they were re-transmitted. This proved difficult to achieve high standards with and instead a high frequency transmission was installed and taken into use on 1 September 1935. With the 1939 opening of Oslo Airport, Fornebu, the North American receiver station was moved to Ski.

The use of Jeløy Radio grew and had its climax during the 1950s. From 1957 multiplexing was used on the transmission to the United States, with two channels used for telegrams and two for telex. At the peak point-to-point connections had been established with seventeen cities, as far away as in Japan and South America. The furthest away was to the Falkland Islands, which was connected to allow for relays onwards to the Norwegian settlement of Grytviken on South Georgia.

Three longwave transmitters were also installed. One was operated for the Norwegian News Agency to transmit news telegrams to newspapers, including to Iceland and the Færoe Islands. The Norwegian Meteorological Institute operated a transmitter which sent a weather map once each day. The third was used for a short period to transmit to Hamburg.

The use of radio telegram and telex transmissions declined rapidly during the 1960s. New technology allowed for cheaper and more reliable transmission via fixed lines, which took over most of the traffic. The last point-to-point connection, to Warsaw, was closed on 1 November 1971. The station was therefore increasingly used as a coast radio station. The Norwegian News Agency turned off their service in 1977. The station remained staffed until 1 January 1995. It was thereafter still used by the Ministry of Foreign Affairs for communications with their embassies until 2003. Telenor turned the operations building into a hotel in 1997.
