= Rogaland Radio =

Coast radio station in Norway

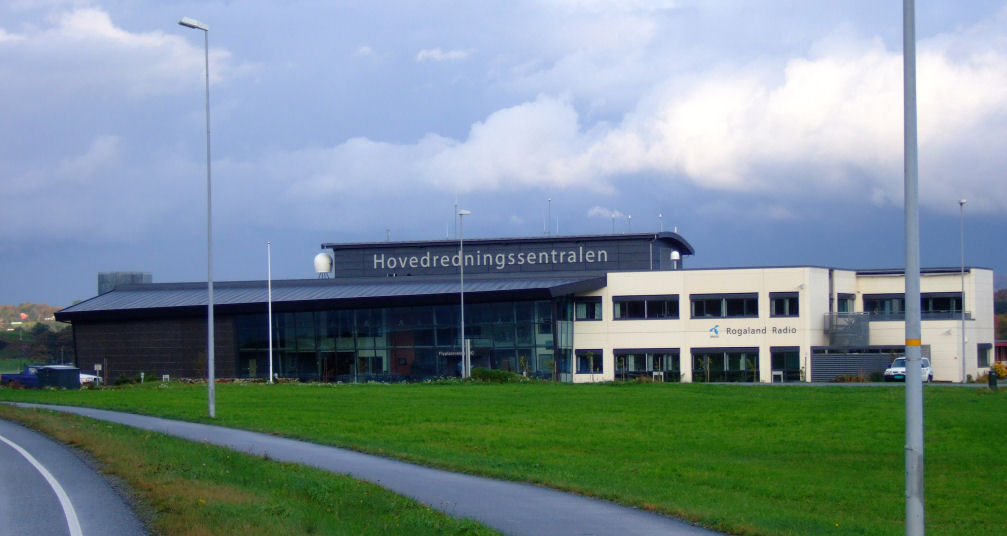
Offices

Map of coverage area

Rogaland Radio is a coast radio station in Sola Municipality, Norway. Operated by Telenor Maritim Radio, it has the responsibility for the coast between Søgne and the Sognefjord. Established in 1960, it was originally located in Sandnes. It has since 2003 been jointly located with the Joint Rescue Coordination Centre of Southern Norway. It is responsible for transmitting maritime safety information via Navtex in Southern Norway.
