= AMTOR =

AMTOR (Amateur Teleprinting Over Radio) is a type of telecommunications system that consists of two or more electromechanical teleprinters in different locations that send and receive messages to one another. AMTOR is a specialized form of RTTY protocol. The term is an acronym for Amateur Teleprinting Over Radio and is derived from ITU-R recommendation 476-1 and is known commercially as SITOR (Simplex Telex Over radio) developed primarily for maritime use in the 1970s. AMTOR was developed in 1978 by Peter Martinez, G3PLX, with the first contact taking place in September 1978 with G3YYD on the 2m Amateur band. It was developed on homemade Motorola 6800-based microcomputers in assembler code. It was used extensively by amateur radio operators in the 1980s and 1990s but has now fallen out of use as improved PC-based data modes are now used and teleprinters became out of fashion.

AMTOR improves on RTTY by incorporating error detection or error correction techniques. The protocol remains relatively uncomplicated and AMTOR performs well even in poor and noisy HF conditions. AMTOR operates in one of two modes: an error detection mode and an automatic repeat request (ARQ) mode.

The AMTOR protocol utilizes a 7-bit code for each character, with each code-word having four mark and three space bits. If the received code does not match a four-to-three (4:3) ratio, the receiver assumes an error has occurred. In error detection mode, the code word will be dropped; in automatic repeat request mode, the receiver requests that the original data be resent. AMTOR also supports FEC in which simple bit-errors can be corrected.

AMTOR utilizes FSK, with a frequency shift of 170 Hz, and a symbol rate of 100 Baud.

AMTOR is rarely used today, as other protocols such as PSK31 are becoming favoured by amateur operators for real-time text communications. The ARRL has announced that as of August 17, 2009, it will be dropping AMTOR bulletin service in favor of the more popular MFSK16 and PSK31 modes.

A sample AMTOR transmission
The text "Welcome to Wikipedia, the free encyclopedia that anyone can edit." sent as AMTOR FEC

== See also ==
- SITOR
- NAVTEX
- Radioteletype
