= SITOR =

System for transmitting text messages

SITOR (SImplex Teletype Over Radio) is a system for transmitting text messages. It was developed in the 1960s by Koninklijke TNT Post as an improvement over radioteletype (RTTY). Although it uses the same frequency-shift keying (FSK) modulation used by regular RTTY, SITOR uses error detection, redundancy, and/or retransmission to improve reliability.

There are two SITOR modes:

- SITOR-A is used for point to point links. SITOR-A uses automatic repeat request (ARQ) to gain reliability. If the receiver detects an error, it requests a retransmission.
- SITOR-B is used for broadcast links. SITOR-B transmits each character in a message twice to gain reliability. If the receiver detects an error in the first character, it uses the copy. If both characters are garbled, the receiver won't know what was sent.
- SITOR-B by definition uses forward error correction (FEC), versus ARQ for SITOR-A.

SITOR sends 7-bit characters as a bit stream at 100 baud (which, in this case, is 100 bits per second, 10 milliseconds per bit, or 70 milliseconds per character).

The bitstream is FSK modulated with a 170 Hz frequency shift. The high frequency is a mark, and the low frequency is a space.

== Applications ==
SITOR is used commonly on shortwave bands, where it is used to transmit maritime-related information such as weather forecasts and storm warnings.

SITOR-B is used for narrow-band direct printing (NBDP).

NAVTEX marine weather and safety messages are broadcast using SITOR-B. The NAVTEX messages have a specific format that is interpreted by NAVTEX receivers. (NAVTEX is layered on top of SITOR-B just as HTTP is layered on top of TCP.)

Amateur radio uses SITOR but calls it AMTOR, AMateur Teleprinting Over Radio. AMTOR-A is SITOR-A. AMTOR-B (also called AMTOR-FEC) is SITOR-B. In 1991, an AMTOR extension was described that includes lower case and other printable ASCII characters.

== Technical Details ==
=== Character set ===
RTTY uses the ITA2 (Baudot code) character code. ITA2 is a five bit code with 32 possible code points. Four code points are used for null (BLANK), space (SPACE), carriage return (CR), and line feed (LF). Two code points are used for a letter shift (LTRS) or a figure shift (FIGS). The remaining 26 code points are used for characters in the letters and figures sets. Consequently, ITA2 can represent 2×26 = 52 additional characters.

SITOR recasts ITA2 into a 7 bit code called CCIR 476. Each 7 bit character in CCIR 476 has 4 marks (ones) and 3 spaces (zeros). Each valid character code has a Hamming distance of at least 2 from every other character. A single-bit error will disrupt the balance of marks and spaces; a second bit error may (or may not) bring the count back to 4 marks and 3 spaces. Consequently, the CCIR 476 alphabet is guaranteed to detect all single bit errors within a character.

=== SITOR control characters ===
The number of valid binary code values in CCIR 476 is the number of ways to choose 4 marks for 7 bit positions, and the number can be calculated using the binomial coefficient: $\ \textstyle \binom{7}{3} = \binom{7}{4} = 35\ .$ Thus CCIR 476 has 3 additional code points over ITA2. SITOR uses the additional code points for idle, phasing, and repeat requests. In addition, some of the ordinary characters are reused as control signals.

Code (bits 6543210)	mode A (ARQ)	mode B (FEC)
1100101 ["L"]	Control signal 1 (CS1)	
1101010 [NUL]	Control signal 2 (CS2)	
1011001 ["N"]	Control signal 3 (CS3)	
0110101 ["G"]	Control signal 4 (CS4)	
1101001 ["H"]	Control signal 5 (CS5)	
0110011	Idle signal β	Idle signal β
0001111	Idle signal α	Phasing signal 1 Idle signal α
1100110	Signal repetition (RQ)	Phasing signal 2

=== SITOR-A ===
Transmission in synchronous frames of 450 ms. Three characters are transmitted by the Information Sending Station (ISS), which takes 210 ms. The ISS then waits 240 ms for a response. The Information Receiving Station (IRS) receives the three characters and checks that they each have four marks and three spaces. If they do, then the IRS transmits an acknowledgement. If they don't, then the IRS requests retransmission. At the beginning of the next frame, the ISS either retransmits the last three characters or transmits the next three characters.

=== SITOR-B ===
SITOR idling pattern
Listen to a sample of a SITOR idler pattern, from the U.S. Coast Guard station NMC (Point Reyes). The letters "NMC" are also transmitted in Morse.

SITOR has an aurally easy to identify idling pattern. Synchronization bursts are transmitted every second or so and last for slightly more than one second. Every few sync bursts, a Morse identifier of three letters is transmitted (for example NMO in Honolulu).

== See also ==
- AMTOR
- NAVTEX
- Radioteletype
