= NAVAREA =

Maritime zones relating to navigational warnings

NAVAREAs, also described as Navigational areas, are the maritime geographic areas in which specific governments are responsible for broadcasting navigation warnings. Weather warnings have a similar system using METAREAs

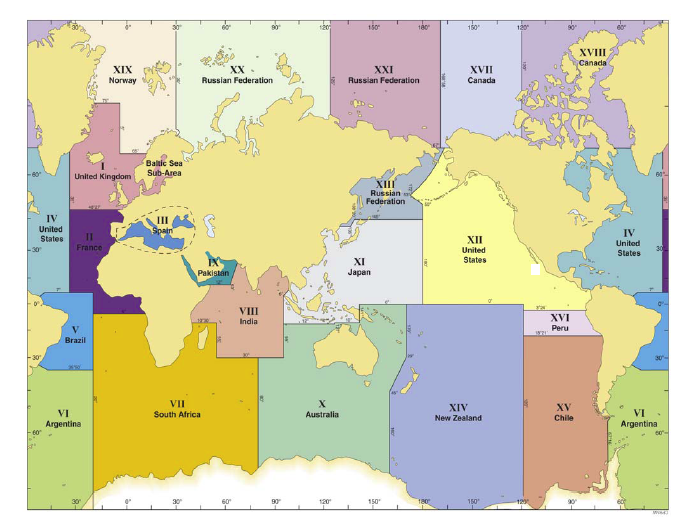
Map of all the NAVAREAs

NAVAREAs are mentioned in International Maritime Organization Assembly Resolution A.706(17) adopted 6 November 1991.

The International Hydrographic Organization publication S-53 has a document entitled "Worldwide Navigational Warnings Service - Guidance Document" which is related to NAVAREAs.

== See also ==
- World-Wide Navigational Warning Service – Global radio warning system for shipping
