= Telenor Avidi =

Former subsidiary of Telenor

Telenor Avidi AS was a subsidiary of Telenor Plus Holdings AS which is 100% owned by the Norwegian telecommunications company Telenor ASA. The company has now been merged with Telenor's cable and satellite television subsidiary Canal Digital. Telenor Avidi was the largest provider of cable television in Norway.
