= Byeonsan =

Mountain in South Korea

Highest point
- Listing: Mountains of Korea
- Coordinates: 35°40′51″N 126°31′53″E

Geography
- Country: South Korea
- Province: North Jeolla

Korean name
- Hangul: 변산
- Hanja: 邊山
- RR: Byeonsan
- MR: Pyŏnsan

Byeonsan (Uisangbong) is a mountain of North Jeolla Province, western South Korea. It has an altitude of 509 metres.

== See also ==
- Byeonsan-bando National Park
