= Tjøme Radio =

Coast radio station in Norway

Coordinates: 59.4153°N 10.4971°E

Map of coverage area

Tjøme Radio is a coast radio station in Horten Municipality, Norway. Operated by Telenor Maritim Radio, it has the responsibility for Skagerrak coast between Søgne and the Norway–Sweden border. It also covers the lake Mjøsa. Established in 1905 by the Royal Norwegian Navy, it became a civilian installation five years later. The station was located in Tjøme Municipality until 2008.
