= Florø Radio =

Coast radio station in Norway

Coordinates: 61°35′58″N 5°02′07″E

- Map of coverage area
- Florø, Kinn
- Broadcast area: North Sea, Norwegian Sea
- Frequencies: VHF (Maritime), MF
- Branding: Telenor Kystradio Nord

Programming
- Languages: Norwegian, English

Ownership
- Owner: Telenor Maritim Radio

History
- Call sign meaning: LGQ

Links
- Website: kystradio.no

Florø Radio is a coast radio station in the town of Florø which is located in Kinn Municipality, Vestland county, Norway. Operated by Telenor Maritim Radio, it has the responsibility for North Sea and Norwegian Sea coast between Sognefjord and Rørvik. It was established in 1938.
