= Svalbard Radio =

Coast radio station in Norway

Coordinates: 78°02′00″N 14°14′05″E

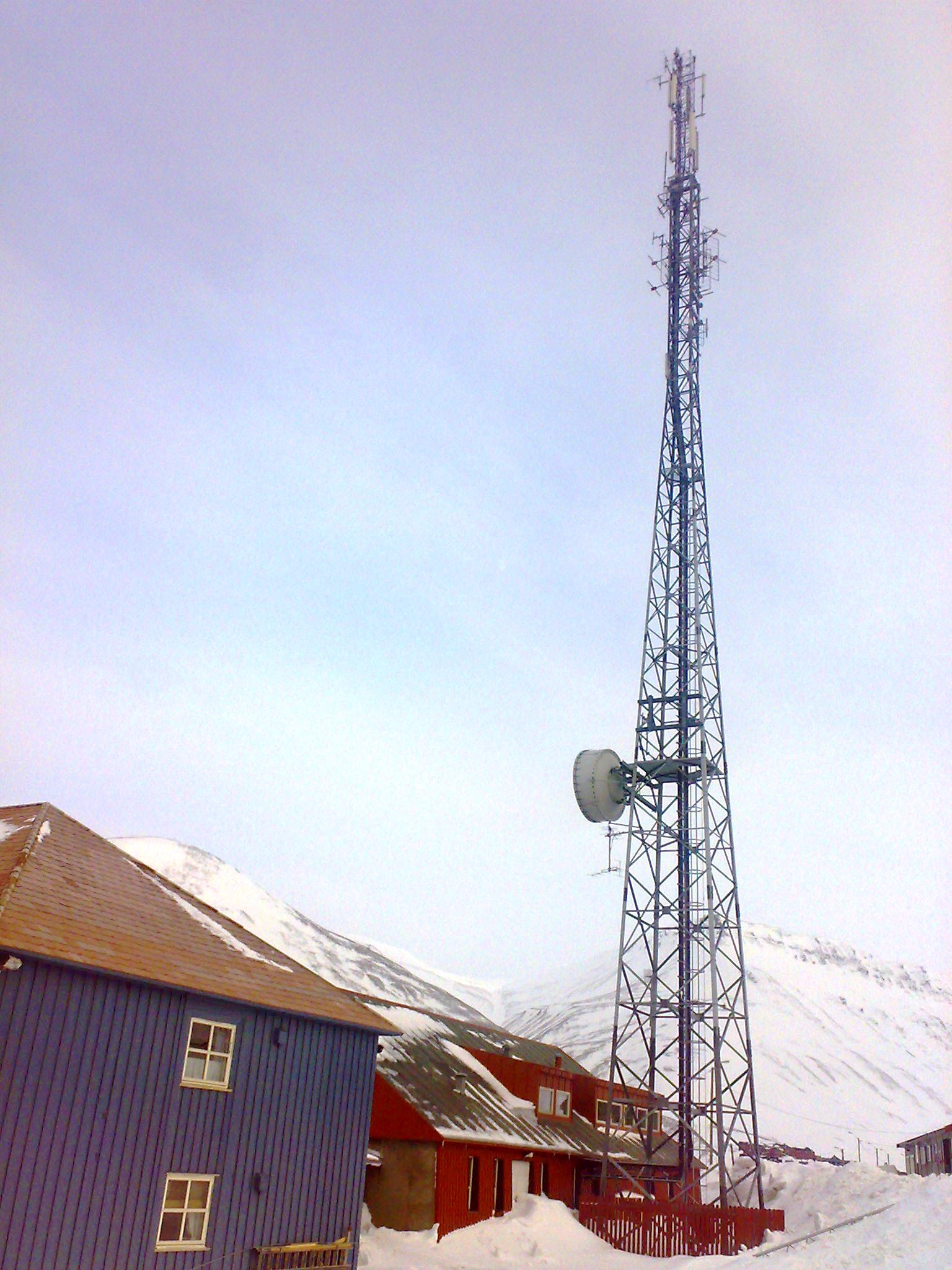
Svalbard Radio

Svalbard Radio is a coast radio station established in 1911 at Finneset in Svalbard, Norway. In 1930, it moved to Skjæringa in Longyearbyen and since 1975 it has been co-located with Svalbard Airport, Longyear. It has been remote-controlled from Bodø Radio since 2006.
