= Bodø Radio =

Coast radio station in Norway

Coordinates: 67.2850°N 14.3817°E

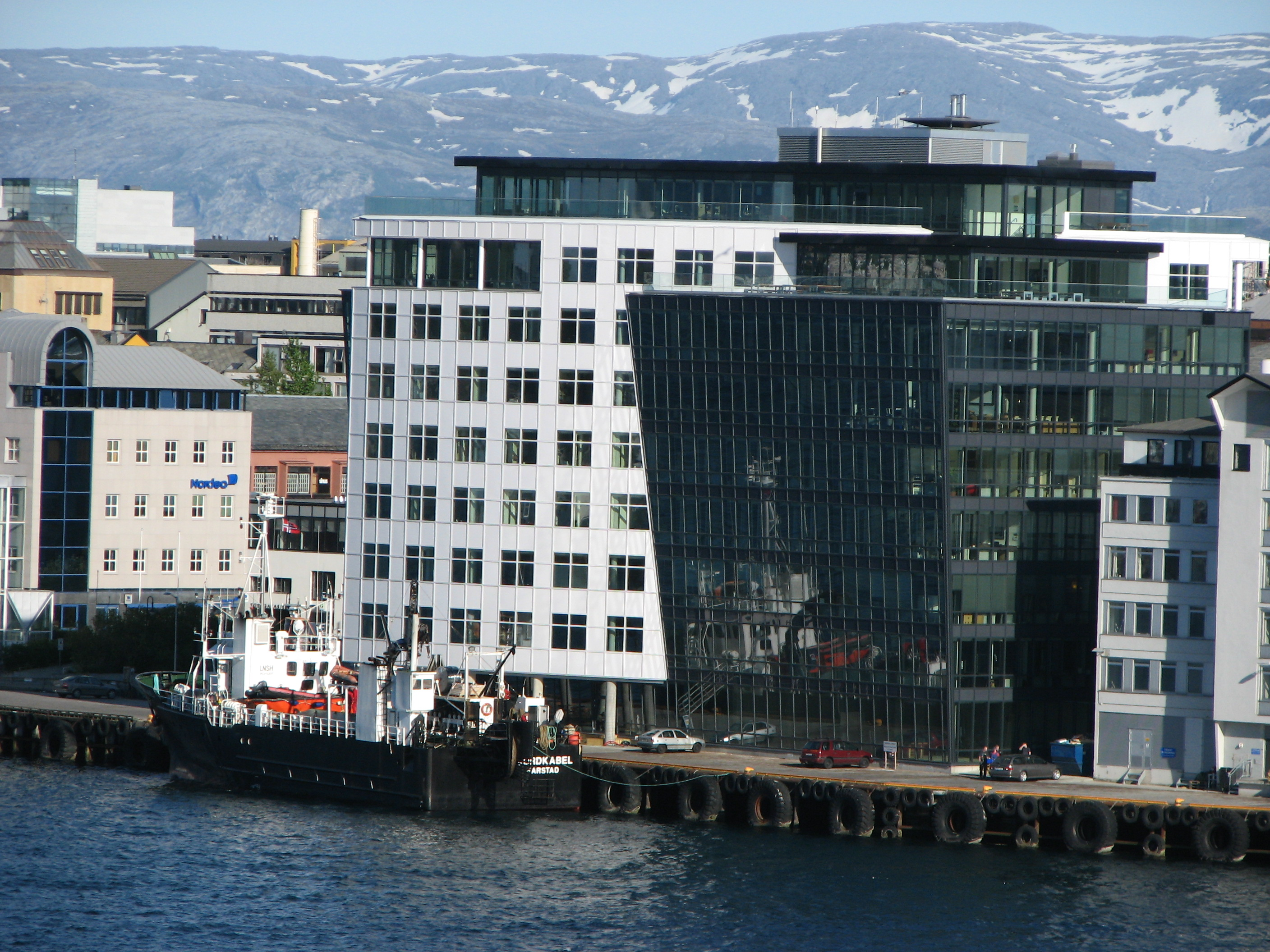
The offices in downtown Bodø

Map of coverage area

Bodø Radio is a coast radio station in Bodø, Norway. Operated by Telenor Maritim Radio, it has the responsibility for Norwegian Sea coast between Rørvik and Tromsø. It was established in 1938 and is jointly located with the Joint Rescue Coordination Centre of Northern Norway. Bodø Radio issues all maritime safety information for Northern Norway, including feeding all Navtex transmitters. It also has the responsibilities for the areas around Svalbard and Jan Mayen.
