= NAVTEX =

System for remotely transmitting printed notices to ships

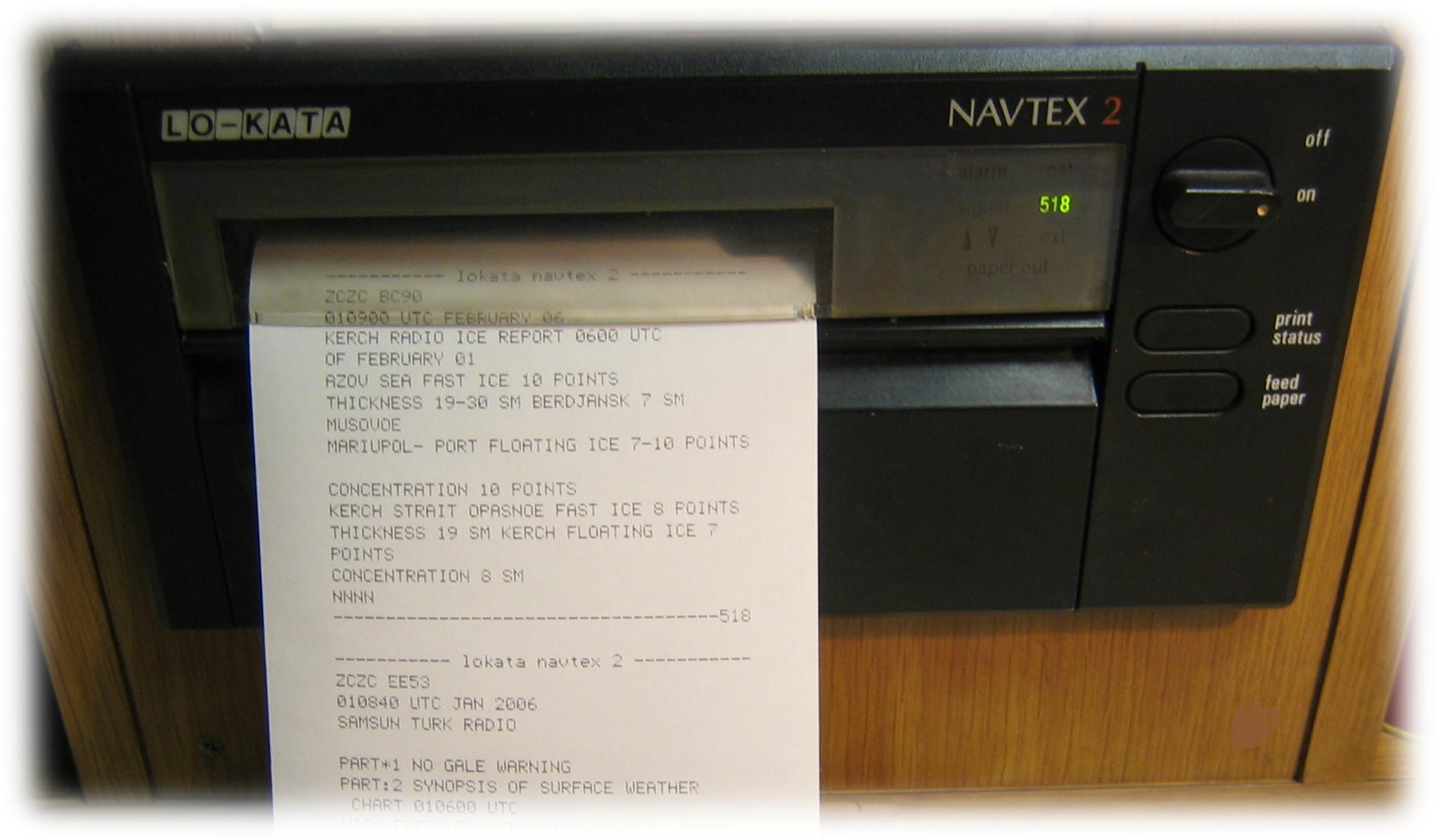
A NAVTEX receiver prints an incoming message

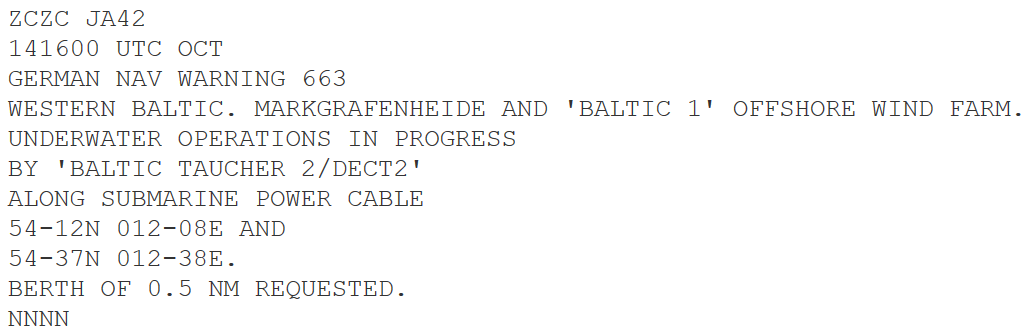
NAVTEX message for the Baltic Sea

NAVTEX (NAVigational TEleX), sometimes styled Navtex or NavTex, is an international automated medium frequency direct-printing service for delivery of navigational and meteorological warnings and forecasts, as well as urgent maritime safety information (MSI) to ships.

NAVTEX was developed in the late 1970s in northwestern Europe to provide a low-cost, simple, and automated means of receiving this information aboard ships at sea within approximately 250 nautical miles (460 km) off-shore.

There are no user fees associated with receiving NAVTEX broadcasts, as the transmissions are typically transmitted from the National Weather Authority (Italy) or Navy or Coast Guard (as in the US) or national navigation authority (Canada).

Where the messages contain weather forecasts, an abbreviated format very similar to the shipping forecast is used.

NAVTEX is a component of the International Maritime Organization/International Hydrographic Organization Worldwide Navigation Warning Service (WWNWS). NAVTEX is also a major element of the Global Maritime Distress Safety System (GMDSS). SOLAS Convention mandated certain classes of vessels must carry NAVTEX, beginning August 1, 1993.

== Technical information ==
NAVTEX transmissions are also called narrow-band direct printing (NBDP). The transmissions are layered on top of SITOR collective B-mode. SITOR-B is a forward error correcting (FEC) broadcast that uses the CCIR 476 character set. NAVTEX messages are transmitted at 100 baud using FSK modulation with a frequency shift of 170 Hz.

NAVTEX broadcasts are primarily made on the medium frequency band at 490 kHz and 518 kHz, the latter being the international NAVTEX frequency (Note: The mark frequency is 517.915 kHz, and the space frequency is 518.085 kHz.). Transmissions here should always be in English. National transmission of NAVTEX, where supported, uses 490 kHz specifically for broadcasts in local languages.

NAVTEX Marine Safety Information (MSI) national transmissions also take place on HF at 4209.5 kHz using FEC mode.

== NAVTEX message format ==
NAVTEX messages are transmitted using binary frequency-shift keying (BFSK) at 100 bit/s and a 170 Hz frequency shift. The characters are encoded using the 7-bit CCIR 476 character set which allows for basic error detection. Forward error correction (FEC) is achieved by repeating each character after a 3 character delay, i.e. ...ABCDE... becomes ...A.B.CADBEC.D.E.... This is the same format as the SITOR-B format.

A NAVTEX message is built on SITOR collective B-mode and consists of:

- a phasing signal of at least ten seconds
- the four characters "ZCZC" that identify the end of phasing
- a single space
- four characters B_{1}, B_{2}, B_{3} and B_{4} (see below)
- a carriage return and a line feed
- the information
- the four characters "NNNN" to identify the end of information
- a carriage return and two line feeds
- either

- 5 or more seconds of phasing signal and another message starting with "ZCZC" or
- an end of emission idle signal α for at least 2 seconds.

B_{1} is an alpha character identifying the station, and B_{2} is an alpha character used to identify the subject of the message. Receivers use these characters to reject messages from certain stations or if the message contains subjects of no interest to the user.

B_{3} and B_{4} are two-digit numerics identifying individual messages, used by receivers to keep already received messages from being repeated.

For example, a message containing B_{1}B_{2}B_{3}B_{4} characters of 'FE01' from a U.S. NAVTEX station indicates a weather forecast message from Boston, MA.

NAVTEX message example:

(phasing signals >= 10 seconds)
ZCZC FE01
(message text ...)
NNNN

(end of message phasing signals for >= 2 seconds before next message)

=== Start of message ===
ZCZC begins the messages.

=== Transmitter identity (B_{1}) ===
This character defines the transmitter identity and its associated coverage area.

=== Subject indicator character (B_{2}) ===
The subject indicator character is used by the receiver to identify different classes of messages below. The indicator is also used to reject messages concerning certain optional subjects which are not required by the ship (e.g. LORAN C messages might be rejected in a ship which is not fitted with a LORAN C receiver).

NAVTEX broadcasts use following subject indicator characters:

A	Navigational warnings ^{1}
B	Meteorological warnings ^{1}
C	Ice reports
D	Search & rescue information, and pirate warnings ^{1}
E	Meteorological forecasts
F	Pilot service messages
G	AIS messages (formerly Decca messages)
H	LORAN messages
I	Not used (formerly OMEGA messages)
J	SATNAV messages (i.e. GPS or GLONASS)
K	Other electronic navaid messages
L	Navigational warnings — additional to letter A (Should not be rejected by the receiver)
T	Test transmissions (UK only — not official)
V	Notice to fishermen (U.S. only — currently not used)
W	Environmental (U.S. only — currently not used)
X	Special services — allocation by IMO NAVTEX Panel
Y	Special services — allocation by IMO NAVTEX Panel
Z	No message on hand

Note: Receivers use the B_{2} character to identify messages which, because of their importance, can not be rejected (designated by a ^{1}). The subject indicator characters B, F and G are normally not used in the United States since the National Weather Service normally includes meteorological warnings in forecast messages. Meteorological warnings are broadcast using the subject indicator character E. U.S. Coast Guard District Broadcast Notices to Mariners affecting ships outside the line of demarcation, and inside the line of demarcation in areas where deep draft vessels operate, use the subject indicator character A.

=== Serial number of message (B_{3}, B_{4}) ===
These two characters define the serial number of each B_{2} message type (class). Generally serial numbers start with the numbers '01', however in special circumstances, the numbers begin with '00'. This forces the receiver to print the message.

=== Time of origin ===
Time of origin is in the format of "DDHHmm UTC MMM YY" where DD is the date, HH hour, mm minute and MMM three-character abbreviation of month and YY year. The time of the transmission of the message is in UTC.

=== Message text ===
The full text of the message follows.

=== End of message ===
The end of the message is asserted when the characters "NNNN" are received.

== NAVTEX transmission schedule ==
Each station identifier has a fixed 10-minute time slot, starting with A at 0000 UTC. The time slots are repeated at 4 hour intervals. Within each time slot, a mix of navigation warnings, weather forecasts, ice information and other content may be sent, and this is normally according to a structured plan for that specific station. For example, in the first and third time slot they may decide to transmit navigation warnings, and weather forecasts in the others. Normally each NAVAREA or sub-NAVAREA has only one station at each slot.

Details of all transmitting stations and their schedules may be found at

== NAVTEX receivers ==
NAVTEX receivers which are approved for GMDSS contain an internal printer and/or a scrollable display, and cost between $800–$1500. A new generation of NAVTEX receivers intended for non-GMDSS applications such as the recreational community is entering the marketplace. These receivers include features such as LCD screens and RS-232 output and have a purchase price in the $300–$500 range. In the UK they can be purchased for £115. There are also a number of NAVTEX engines available that do not have any user interface, and just output decoded data in RS-232 format, either as a simple ASCII data stream, or using the NMEA NAVTEX sentences, or their own proprietary protocol.

There are also a number of software packages available (SeaTTY, Mscan, JNX, Fldigi or JVComm32 are examples) that allow messages NAVTEX to be decoded by on a personal computer connected to a receiver that covers the medium frequency range. The computer uses its sound device as a modem.

== Proposed termination of U.S. NAVTEX ==
In September 2019, the U.S. Coast Guard proposed shutting down its MF NAVTEX services and relying on satellite communications.

== See also ==
A sample NAVTEX transmission
The text "Welcome to Wikipedia, the free encyclopedia that anyone can edit." sent in NAVTEX format.

- List of Navtex stations
- Maritime safety information
- Radiofax
