= Winmor =

WINMOR is a radio transmission protocol intended to be used in the Winlink 2000 Global Radio E-mail System by amateur radio operators, marine radio stations, and radio stations in isolated areas. WINMOR complemented the PACTOR modes in the high frequency portion of the Winlink system, but since July 2020 has been deprecated by Winlink.org in favour of other, now more modern and capable protocols, such as ARDOP.

WINMOR debuted at the 2008 ARRL / TAPR Digital Communications Conference. Unlike PACTOR II & III, only a simple computer soundcard-to-radio interface is required, as compared to PACTOR's relatively expensive external terminal node controller. It has two modes, either 500 or 1600 Hertz in bandwidth, and provides ARQ speeds ranging from 67 to at least 1300 bits per second, similar to PACTOR's various modes. It is fully documented and without restrictions or license issues preventing anyone from using the protocol in other software. WINMOR supports both connected (ARQ) and FEC (broadcast) modes.

Operational peer-to-peer (on-air) beta testing of WINMOR began on 17 September 2009. Deployment of RMS WINMOR servers for the Winlink system began in January 2010.

== Transmission modes ==
500 Hz bandwidth uses 2 carriers, 1600 Hz bandwidth uses 8 carriers.

Each carrier uses 46.875 Baud 4FSK or 93.75 Baud PSK using Trellis Coded Modulation with 4, 8, or 16 phases.

== See also ==
- Shortwave
- Radioteletype
- PACTOR
