= 3Y5X Bouvet Island DXpedition =

Amateur radio DXpedition to Bouvet Island

- Location of Bouvet Island

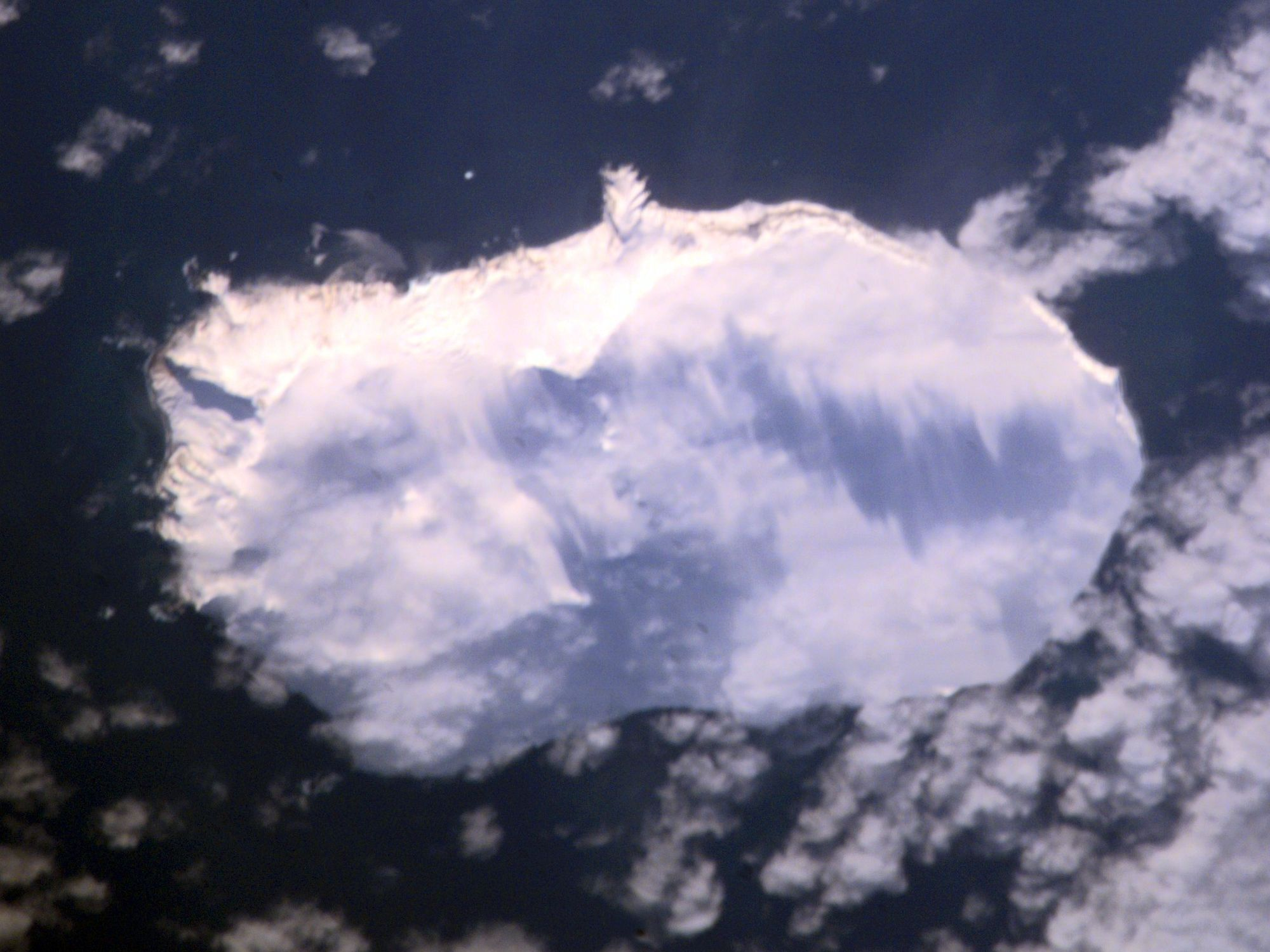
- Satellite image of Bouvet Island
- Dates operated: December 28, 1989 – January 13, 1990
- Bands operated: 10, 15, 20, 40, 80, 160 m
- Modes used: CW, SSB, RTTY
- Number of contacts: 47,000
- Number of operators: 6

The 3Y5X Bouvet Island DXpedition was an amateur radio event that occurred from December 28, 1989, until January 13, 1990. The expedition had planned to land on Bouvet Island on Christmas Eve but was delayed due to weather, while on the island the operators managed to operate for more than two weeks. Of the contacts made approximately 16,800 were made using CW, 30,000 contacts on SSB, and 291 contacts were made with RTTY.
