= ICOM IC-7300 =

Amateur radio transceiver

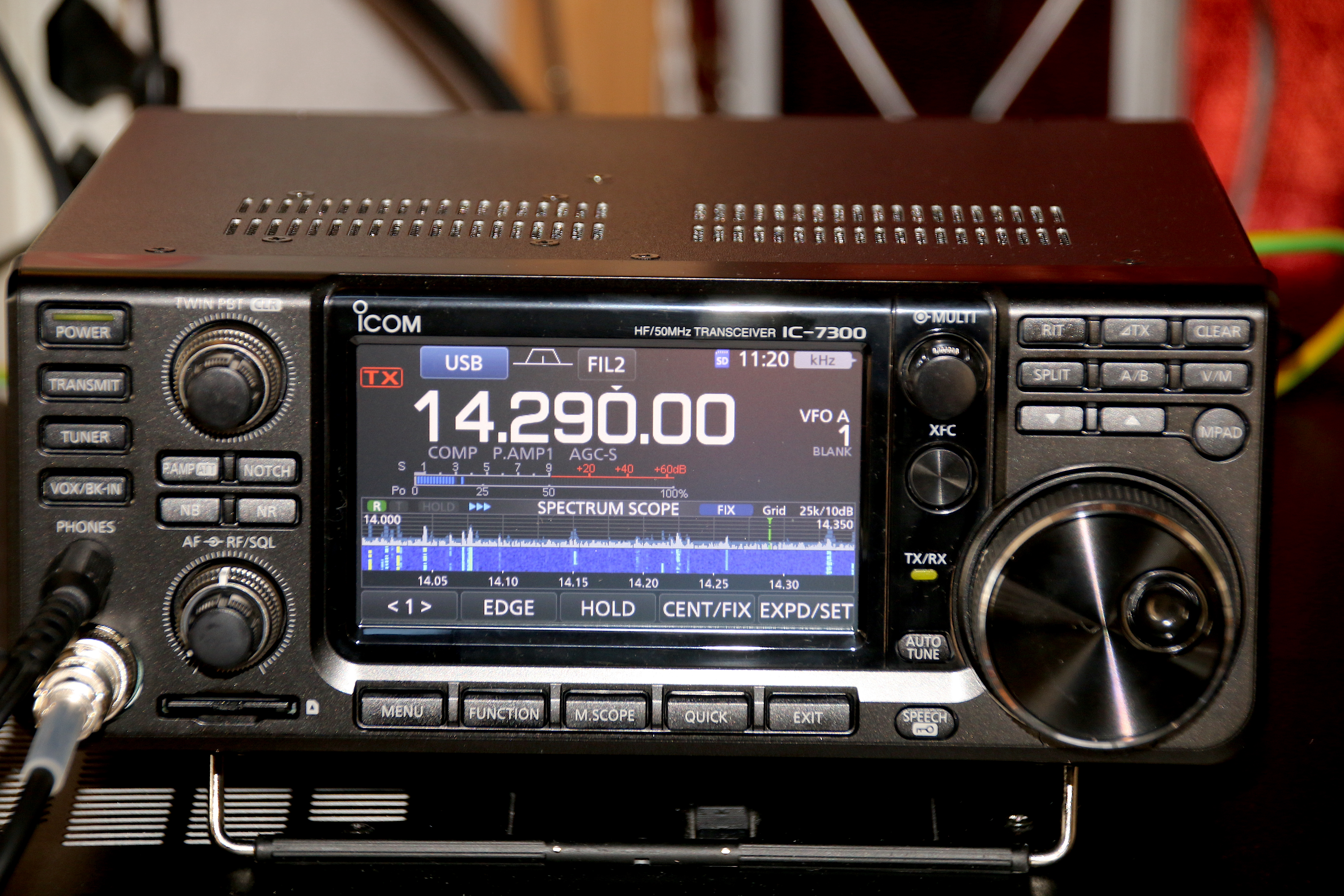
An ICOM IC-7300 radio, tuned to the 20-meter band

The ICOM IC-7300 is a multimode 6-meter, 4-meter (ITU Region 1 only) and HF base station amateur radio transceiver.

== History ==
The IC-7300 was announced to the public at the Japan Ham Fair in 2015. The radio has 100 watts output on CW, SSB, and FM modulations, and 25 watts of output on AM. Although not the first software-defined radio on the market, the IC-7300 was the first mass-produced mainstream amateur radio to use SDR technology instead of the older PLL-based transceiver design. Designed to replace the older IC-746PRO, the IC-7300 is smaller and significantly lighter than its predecessor. Like many other radios of its class, the IC-7300 has an internal antenna tuner, and contains an internal audio card accessible over USB. This allows the radio to be used for popular digital modes such as PSK31, Winlink, and FT8.

The radio has received praise for its easy-to-use menus, large, readable screen, and excellent audio processing.

Over 100,000 IC-7300 transceivers have been sold globally since 2015.

In 2025, ICOM announced an "IC-7300MK2" version that updates the model to include modern features.

== Specifications ==
Specifications of the ICOM IC-7300 are:

- Frequency range: Tx: 1.8 – 54 MHz (amateur bands only without modification) Rx: 30 kHz – 74.8 MHz
- Modes of emission: A1A (CW), A3E (AM), J3E (LSB, USB), F3E (FM)
- Impedance: SO-239 50 ohms, unbalanced
- Supply voltage: 13.8 VDC
- Current consumption: Rx: 1.25 A Tx: 21 A
- Case size (WxHxD): 240×94×238 mm; 9.45×3.7×9.37 in
- Weight (approx.): 4.2 kg; 9.26 lb
- Output power: 100 W (adjustable 5-100 watts) SSB/CW/FM (AM: 2 5W - adjustable 5-25 watts)
- Transmitter modulation
  - SSB: digital phase-shift network (PSN) modulation
  - AM: digital low power modulation
  - FM:dDigital phase modulation

ICOM IC-7300MK2 new features:

- Reciprocal mixing dynamic range: approx. 105 dB (+12 dB)
- Phase noise: -139 dBc/Hz @ 1 kHz offset
- HDMI output for display
- Reduced RX standby current (reduced from approximately 0.9 A to 0.7 A)
- Integrated CW decoder
- Separate RX antenna socket
- USB-C port with dual virtual COM ports and audio IN/OUT
- LAN port for remote operation with RS-BA1 software without a base station computer
- Supports operation on the 5 MHz band
