= Q15X25 =

Q15X25 is a communications protocol for sending data over a radio link. It was designed by amateur radio operator Pawel Jalocha, SP9VRC, to be an open communications standard. Like all amateur radio communications modes, this protocol uses open transmissions which can be received and decoded by anyone with similar equipment. Q15X25 is a form of packet radio. It can be used to interconnect local VHF AX.25 packet networks over transcontinental distances. Anyone can design or adapt the open-source software to develop their own Q15X25 system.

Q15X25 is a digital signal processor-intensive mode designed to pass AX.25 packets on HF with speed and reliability much greater than traditional HF ARQ modems. It uses 15 QPSK modulated carriers separated by 125 Hertz, each modulated at 83.333 baud. Q15X25 uses forward error correction (FEC), and like MT63, uses time- and frequency-interleaving in order to avoid most error sources. The raw transmission data rate is typically 2500 bit/s.

Typically the DSP based receiver and transmitter modulator or codec is implemented as PC software that uses a sound card to connect directly to an SSB transceiver. Linux implementations are usually called "newpsk" or "newqpsk". MixW, a multipurpose communications control and digital modes package on Windows can implement Kiss and/or "TCP/IP over X.25" on either traditional 300 baud, 1200 baud and 2400 baud FSK packet "modems" implemented as DSP via sound card or over Q15X25. The "FlexNet" Windows packet software also has a newqpsk / Q15X25 option.

As with any amateur radio transmission, anyone can listen/decode Q15X25 transmissions, but an amateur radio operation license is required for transmission.

Frequencies (all USB) in use are (MixW center about 1350 Hz higher):

Wavelength	Frequency
80 m	3585 kHz
40 m	7035 kHz
20 m	14109 kHz

== See also ==
- Radioteletype
- Shortwave
