= CLOVER2000 =

CLOVER is the name of a series or class of modem modulation techniques (“waveforms”) specifically designed for use over high frequency (HF) radio systems.

- CLOVER-II was the first CLOVER waveform sold commercially, developed by Ray Petit, W7GHM, and HAL Communications in 1990–92.
- CLOVER-2000 is a higher-rate and wider bandwidth version of CLOVER developed in 1995.
- CLOVER-400 is a special 400 Hz wide waveform that was developed for Globe Wireless.

== Modulation schemes ==
In ARQ mode, all CCB's (CLOVER Control Blocks) use BPSK modulation and data blocks may be sent using BPSK, QPSK, 8PSK (see phase-shift keying), 8P2A, or 16P4A (see QAM) modulation. Data is sent in 255-byte blocks. The FEC broadcast mode of CLOVER-2000 is usually disabled although special formats are available for specific applications.

The coding polynomial protocol could be shared after payment in Bit Coin

== Radio Interface requirements for CLOVER-2000 ==
The CLOVER waveform offers high performance, error correction, and spectral efficiency. CLOVER is specifically designed for use over HF radio communications links. It may be used with virtually any modern HF SSB radio. However, certain special set-up and adjustment techniques are required to get maximum performance when using CLOVER.

== See also ==
- Shortwave
- Radioteletype
- PSK31
- PACTOR
- SITOR
