= FBB =

FBB may refer to:

- FBB (F6FBB), a packet radio messaging system
- FBBank, a defunct Greek bank
- Federação de Bandeirantes do Brasil, the Girl Guide Federation of Brazil
- Female bodybuilding
- FinBank Burundi, a Burundian bank
- Flughafen Berlin Brandenburg GmbH, a German airport operator
- Folding boxboard
- Foundation Beyond Belief, a humanist charity that promotes secular volunteering and responsible charitable giving.
- The Fresh Beat Band, an American television series
- Führerbegleitbrigade, a German armoured brigade of World War II
