= 7300 =

7300 or variant, may refer to:

== In general ==
- A.D. 7300, a year in the 8th millennium CE
- 7300 BCE, a year in the 8th millennium BC
- 7300, a number in the 7000 (number) range

== Places ==
- 7300 Yoshisada, an asteroid in the Asteroid Belt, the 7300th asteroid registered
- 7300 (District of Pogradec), one of the postal codes in Albania
- 7300 Observatory, Cloudcroft, New Mexico, USA

== Radio ==
- ICOM IC-7300 amateur radio transceiver

== Rail ==
- Hankyu 7300 series electric multiple unit train class
- Hokuso 7300 series electric multiple unit train class
- Tobu 7300 series electric multiple unit train class
- Yurikamome 7300 series train class

== Other uses ==
- IBM 7300, a hard disk drive unit
