= PSK63 =

Digital radio modulation mode

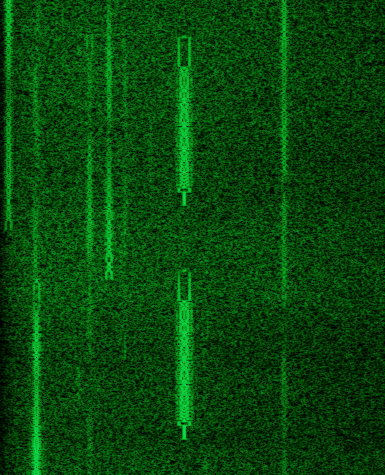
Spectrogram of a PSK63 transmission on the 20-meter band, surrounded by PSK31 transmissions

PSK63 (meaning Phase Shift Keying at a rate of 63 baud) is a digital radio modulation mode used primarily in the amateur radio field to conduct real-time keyboard-to-keyboard informal text chat between amateur radio operators.

== History ==
In April 2003, Skip Teller, KH6TY, the creator of Digipan, requested an addition to Moe (AE4JY) Wheatley's PSKCore DLL to support the PSK63 mode. Subsequently, another mode - PSK125 - has been added to the PSKCore DLL.

- Unlike PSK63F, PSK63 does not use forward error correction (FEC).
- PSK 63 is twice as fast as PSK63F's but exactly the same speed as PSK125F.

== Mode Support ==
PSK63 is now supported directly in KH6TY's own QuikPSK software, as well as in Digipan, AA6YQ's WinWarbler, F6CTE's MultiPSK, AE4JY's WinPSK, HB9DRV's DM780, PSK31 Deluxe, MMVARI, Fldigi, MIXW, and DL4RCK's RCKRtty. It is also supported in hardware by the Elecraft KX3.

Others are likely to follow, now that version 1.17 of the PSKCore dll supports both PSK31 and PSK63. QuikPSK, MultiPSK and PSK31 Deluxe can decode up to 24 signals simultaneously. QuickPSK has a unique additional capability to send colour thumbnail pictures (32x32 pixel, 16 colours) using the PSK63 mode.

== PSK Software Core ==
A PSK63-only version of the PSKCore dll is also available at KH6TY's web site for use with any software that uses PSKCore to implement PSK31. Simply by replacing the original PSKCore file (it is suggested that you rename the original rather than deleting it) with the new version, the PSK31 software supports PSK63 instead of PSK31.

This technique has been used during early experiments with the PSK63 mode, but it is not likely to continue to be very widely used now that software that supports PSK63 directly has become widely available.

The official distribution of the PSKCore DLL, which supports PSK31, PSK63, and PSK125, is available on Moe (AE4JY) Wheatley's website.

== See also ==
- PSK31
- MT63
- Varicode
- Radioteletype
- Shortwave
