= Isotron =

Shortwave antenna

Isotron is the trade name for a shortwave antenna marketed by Bilal Co. for use as an amateur radio transmitting antenna for restricted spaces. It is physically short as compared to a dipole antenna for a given frequency. The bandwidth of the Isotron is quite narrow as compared with a dipole antenna. This is most pronounced on the lower frequency bands.

== Theory of operation ==
A Isotron antenna is electrically resonant by using only two components: a large coil in series with the capacitive plates. Its design is electrically the same of a 1/2 wave dipole.

== See also ==
- Antenna (radio)
- Dipole
