= Sailmail =

SailMail is radio based e-mail system designed for boat owners operating beyond line-of-sight radio links to the internet. Much of its underlying technology is built upon the Winlink software originally developed by amateur radio enthusiasts. Operation on SailMail network frequencies requires a PACTOR modem and an SSB radio. Sailmail operators do not need to hold an amateur radio license, as is the case for the similar Airmail product. As of December 2023 the annual membership cost was US $275.
