= MT63 =

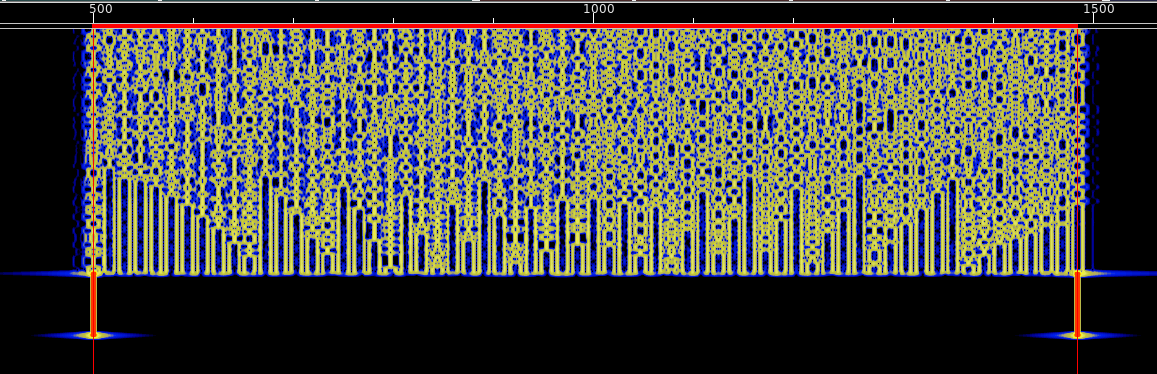
Spectrogram of MT63-1K Modulation

MT63 is a digital radio modulation mode for transmission in high-noise situations. It was developed by Pawel Jalocha, call sign SP9VRC, primarily for keyboard-to-keyboard conversations on HF amateur radio bands.

== Description ==
MT63 distributes the encoding of each character over a long time period, and over several tones. This code and symbol spreading implementation is key to its robustness under less than ideal conditions. The MT63 mode is very tolerant of mistuning; most software will handle 120 Hz tuning offsets under normal conditions.

Mode	Symbol rate	Typing speed	Duty cycle	Modulation	Bandwidth	ITU designation
MT63-500	5 baud	5.0 cps (50 wpm)	80%	64 × 2-PSK	500 Hz	500HJ2DEN
MT63-1000	10 baud	10.0 cps (100 wpm)	80%	64 × 2-PSK	1000 Hz	1K00J2DEN
MT63-2000	20 baud	20.0 cps (200 wpm)	80%	64 × 2-PSK	2000 Hz	2K00J2DEN

== Latency ==
MT63 can use either a short or long interleaver. The long interleaver makes the mode more robust against interference, at the cost of increasing latency.

Mode	ECC mode	Latency (sec)
MT63 500 Hz	short	6.4
MT63 1K	short	3.2
MT63 1K	long	6.4
MT63 2K	short	1.6
MT63 2K	long	3.2
PSK31	-	<1

== Media ==
A sample MT63 transmission
The text "Welcome to Wikipedia, the free encyclopedia that anyone can edit." sent as MT63-1K.

A sample MT63 transmission
The text "Welcome to Wikipedia, the free encyclopedia that anyone can edit." sent as MT63-2LG.

MT63 was used on shortwave by the VOA Radiogram until 2017, but the software used to encode the text was not using the Varicode that MT63 used in its original design.

Modern software that supports MT63, such as Fldigi, uses base128, essentially the same as ASCII.

MT63 has been promoted as a modulation format for time signal stations, but this system does not use Varicode.

== See also ==
- Walsh code
- Varicode
- Radioteletype
- Shortwave radio
- PSK63

== Related links ==
- "MT63 Technical Information", ZL1BPU website (archived 2008)
- "MT63", ZL1BPU website (archived 2008)
- BARTG site - British Amateur Radio Teledata Group
- Fldigi MT63
- MT63 mooted as a time transfer technology
