= QRZ.com =

Amateur radio callsign website

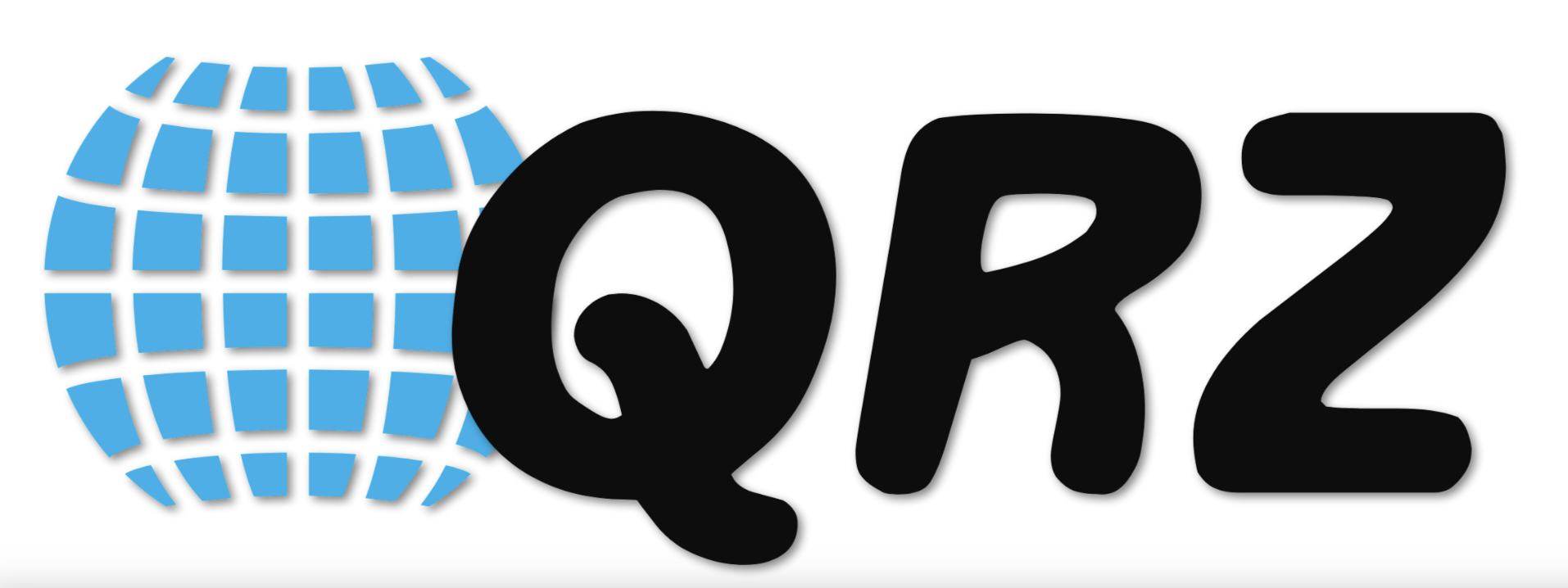
- Founded: 1992
- Founder: Fred Lloyd
- Website: https://www.qrz.com

QRZ.com is an amateur radio website listing almost every callsign in the world. In 1992, QRZ founder Fred L. Lloyd accessed data from the FCC database to create a CD-ROM with all call signs issued in the United States. A copy of the CD-ROM is carried on board the International Space Station and one was also aboard the Russian Mir space station. QRZ.com is one of the most recognized websites for amateur radio enthusiasts. Information is pulled directly from the FCC database and from on-line databases of other nations, when available. Registered users can edit their data for accuracy and currency and many list additional information about their station, antennas and other life interests.

== Etymology ==
QRZ, the name of the website, is the "Q" code for "Who is calling me?" and corresponds to the site's purpose of assisting amateur radio operators with the lookup of ham radio call signs from every country in the world.

== Features ==
The website features a personal web page where registered amateur radio operators can post pictures of their ham radio shack, tell facts about themselves, and post their email and postal addresses for other radio amateurs to send their QSL cards and list any equipment they would like to sell. The website also features online discussion forums.

== Others call-books ==
Callsign lookup systems (callbooks) similar to QRZ.com
Name	Website	Model	Estimated database size (vs QRZ.com ≈ 100%)	Main differentials	Notes / Age
QRZ.com	qrz.com	Freemium (limited free + paid)	~1–2+ million active (100%)	Largest international active callsign database; logbook with >1.27 billion QSOs; forums; awards; paid XML API; rich profiles.	Founded 1993. Industry standard.
HamQTH.com	hamqth.com	Free	~1.79 million (~80–90%)	Completely free (no invasive ads); free XML/JSON API; logbook; no login required for basic data; 18 languages.	Started 2011. Long-running free alternative.
HamCall.net (Buckmaster)	hamcall.net	Freemium (free basic + paid Gold)	>16.7 million total (current + historical)	One of the largest databases (includes extensive historical records); monthly DVD/USB since 1989; DX spots; advanced search on paid tier.	Oldest (CD-ROM since 1989). Strong on historical data.
QRZCQ.com	qrzcq.com	Free	~203,000 registered users	Large community; logbook; integrated DX cluster; SWL support; chat, maps and articles.	Active since ~2011. Community-oriented.
QRZ.digital	qrz.digital	100% free (sponsorships optional)	Nascent / small (<<5%)	Very promising and the most technological of all. First of Brazilian origin; supports 10+ languages; Google-like search and features; modern and fast log system; highly organized design. Free core with optional sponsorships that help sustain it. Constant new resources and community collaboration make it a strong candidate to become the newest favorite.	Launched ~2025. Modern AWS-based platform focused on operators.
Club Log	clublog.org	Free	~139,000 callsigns (~88,000 users)	Advanced log analysis and DXCC tools; OQRS; propagation statistics; more of a log/DX tool than a pure callbook.	Specialized in DXing and awards.
Callook.info	callook.info	Free	US-only (~730,000 active FCC licenses)	Public open API (JSON/XML); official FCC data, regularly updated; no login required.	US-focused only.
OpenCallbook	opencallbook.com	Free / open-source	US-only (FCC Amateur + GMRS)	Documented API (OpenAPI); official FCC data; no tracking.	Recent open-source project.
