= Spurious emission =

Radio frequency not deliberately created

In radio communication, a spurious emission is any component of a radiated radio frequency signal, the complete suppression of which, would not impair the integrity of the modulation type, or the information being transmitted. A radiated signal outside of a transmitter's assigned channel is an example of a spurious emission. Spurious emissions can include harmonic emissions, intermodulation products and frequency conversion products.

== See also ==
- Interference (communication)
- Radio spectrum pollution
