= Bangladesh NGOs Network for Radio and Communication =

Bangladesh NGOs Network for Radio and Communication (BNNRC) is a national networking body in Bangladesh. Its stated objectives include building a democratic society based on the principles of free flow of information, and equitable and affordable access to Information and Communication Technologies for Development (ICT4D) of remote and marginalized population. It is registered with Ministry of Law, Parliamentary and Justice Affairs, Government of Bangladesh as a trust and established in 2000, as per Article 19 charter of United Nations bill of rights. It undertakes activities to promote radio listeners club, amateur radio operators, community radio and television stations, and Internet radio in coastal areas.
