= Radioteletype =

Radio linked electromechanical communications system

A sample RTTY transmission
The text "Welcome to Wikipedia, the free encyclopedia that anyone can edit." sent as RTTY

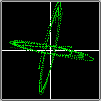
Radioteletype tuning indicator

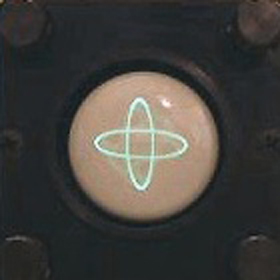
Tuning indicator on cathode ray tube

Radioteletype (RTTY) (Note: may be spoken as "radioteletype", by its letters: R-T-T-Y, or simply as /ˈrɪti/ or /ˈrəti/) is a telecommunications system consisting originally of two or more electromechanical teleprinters in different locations connected by radio rather than a wired link. Radioteletype evolved from earlier landline teleprinter operations that began in the mid-1800s. The US Navy Department successfully tested printing telegraphy between an airplane and ground radio station in 1922. Later that year, the Radio Corporation of America (RCA) successfully tested printing telegraphy via their Chatham, Massachusetts, radio station to the RMS Majestic. Commercial RTTY systems were in active service between San Francisco and Honolulu as early as April 1932 and between San Francisco and New York City by 1934. The US military used radioteletype in the 1930s and expanded this usage during World War II. From the 1980s, teleprinters were replaced by personal computers (PCs) running software to emulate teleprinters.

The term radioteletype is used to describe both the original radioteletype system, sometimes described as "Baudot", as well as the entire family of systems connecting two or more teleprinters or PCs using software to emulate teleprinters, over radio, regardless of alphabet, link system or modulation.

In some applications, notably military and government, radioteletype is known by the acronym RATT (Radio Automatic Teletype).

== History ==
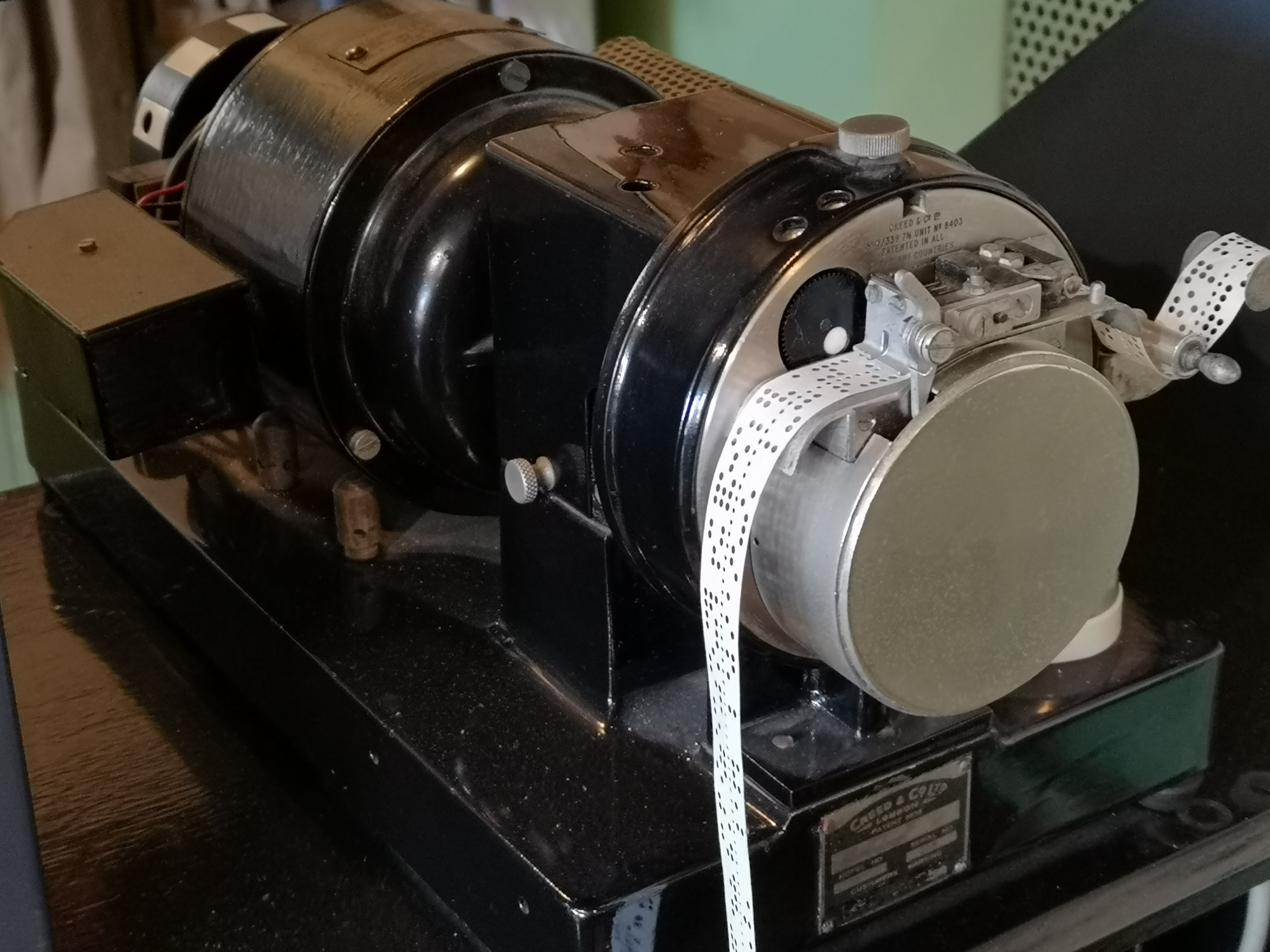
Punched tape of the type used with teleprinters in a Creed model 6S/2 5-hole paper tape reader

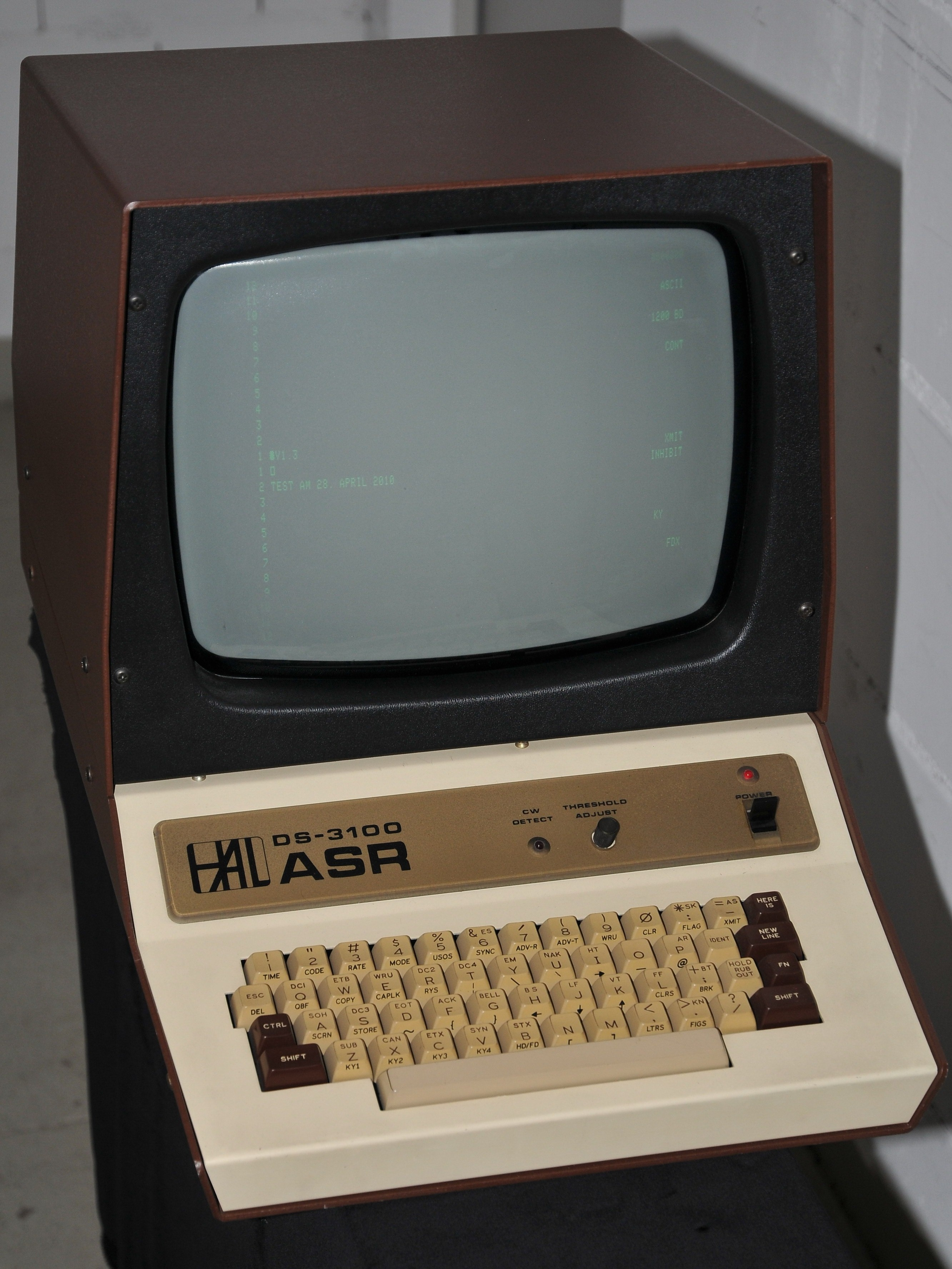
Electronic RTTY terminal, c. 1980

Landline teleprinter operations began in 1849 when a circuit was put in service between Philadelphia and New York City. Émile Baudot designed a system using a five unit code in 1874 that is still in use today. Teleprinter system design was gradually improved until, at the beginning of World War II, it represented the principal distribution method used by the news services.

Radioteletype evolved from these earlier landline teleprinter operations. The US Department of the Navy successfully tested printing telegraphy between an airplane and ground radio station in August 1922. Later that year, the Radio Corporation of America (RCA) successfully tested printing telegraphy via their Chatham, MA radio station to the RMS Majestic. An early implementation of the Radioteletype was the Watsongraph, named after Detroit inventor Glenn Watson in March 1931. Commercial RTTY systems were in active service between San Francisco and Honolulu as early as April 1932 and between San Francisco and New York City by 1934. The US Military used radioteletype in the 1930s and expanded this usage during World War II. The Navy called radioteletype RATT (Radio Automatic Teletype) and the Army Signal Corps called radioteletype SCRT, an abbreviation of Single-Channel Radio Teletype. The military used frequency shift keying (FSK) technology and this technology proved very reliable even over long distances.

== Technical description ==
A radioteletype station consists of three distinct parts: the Teletype or teleprinter, the modem and the radio.

The Teletype or teleprinter is an electromechanical or electronic device. The word Teletype was a trademark of the Teletype Corporation, so the terms "TTY", "RTTY", "RATT" and "teleprinter" are usually used to describe a generic device without reference to a particular manufacturer.

Electromechanical teleprinters are heavy, complex and noisy, and have largely been replaced with electronic units. The teleprinter includes a keyboard, which is the main means of entering text, and a printer or visual display unit (VDU). An alternative input device is a perforated tape reader and, more recently, computer storage media (such as floppy disks). Alternative output devices are tape perforators and computer storage media.

The line output of a teleprinter can be at either digital logic levels (+5 V signifies a logical "1" or mark and 0 V signifies a logical "0" or space) or line levels (−80 V signifies a "1" and +80 V a "0"). When no traffic is passed, the line idles at the "mark" state.

When a key of the teleprinter keyboard is pressed, a 5-bit character is generated. The teleprinter converts it to serial format and transmits a sequence of a start bit (a logical 0 or space), then one after the other the 5 data bits, finishing with a stop bit (a logical 1 or mark, lasting 1, 1.5 or 2 bits). When a sequence of start bit, 5 data bits and stop bit arrives at the input of the teleprinter, it is converted to a 5-bit word and passed to the printer or VDU. With electromechanical teleprinters, these functions required complicated electromechanical devices, but they are easily implemented with standard digital electronics using shift registers. Special integrated circuits have been developed for this function, for example the Intersil 6402 and 6403. These are stand-alone UART devices, similar to computer serial port peripherals.

The 5 data bits allow for only 32 different codes, which cannot accommodate the 26 letters, 10 figures, space, a few punctuation marks and the required control codes, such as carriage return, new line, bell, etc. To overcome this limitation, the teleprinter has two states, the unshifted or letters state and the shifted or numbers or figures state. The change from one state to the other takes place when the special control codes LETTERS and FIGURES are sent from the keyboard or received from the line. In the letters state the teleprinter prints the letters and space while in the shifted state it prints the numerals and punctuation marks. Teleprinters for languages using other alphabets also use an additional third shift state, in which they print letters in the alternative alphabet.

The modem is sometimes called the terminal unit and is an electronic device which is connected between the teleprinter and the radio transceiver. The transmitting part of the modem converts the digital signal transmitted by the teleprinter or tape reader to one or the other of a pair of audio frequency tones, traditionally 2295/2125 Hz (US) or 2125/1955 Hz (Europe). One of the tones corresponds to the mark condition and the other to the space condition. These audio tones, then, modulate an SSB transmitter to produce the final audio-frequency shift keying (AFSK) radio frequency signal. Some transmitters are capable of direct frequency-shift keying (FSK) as they can directly accept the digital signal and change their transmitting frequency according to the mark or space input state. In this case the transmitting part of the modem is bypassed.

On reception, the FSK signal is converted to the original tones by mixing the FSK signal with a local oscillator called the BFO or beat frequency oscillator. These tones are fed to the demodulator part of the modem, which processes them through a series of filters and detectors to recreate the original digital signal. The FSK signals are audible on a communications radio receiver equipped with a BFO, and have a distinctive "beedle-eeeedle-eedle-eee" sound, usually starting and ending on one of the two tones ("idle on mark").

The transmission speed is a characteristic of the teleprinter while the shift (the difference between the tones representing mark and space) is a characteristic of the modem. These two parameters are therefore independent, provided they have satisfied the minimum shift size for a given transmission speed. Electronic teleprinters can readily operate in a variety of speeds, but mechanical teleprinters require the change of gears in order to operate at different speeds.

Today, both functions can be performed with modern computers equipped with digital signal processors or sound cards. The sound card performs the functions of the modem and the CPU performs the processing of the digital bits. This approach is very common in amateur radio, using specialized computer programs like fldigi, MMTTY or MixW.

Before the computer mass storage era, most RTTY stations stored text on paper tape using paper tape punchers and readers. The operator would type the message on the TTY keyboard and punch the code onto the tape. The tape could then be transmitted at a steady, high rate, without typing errors. A tape could be reused, and in some cases - especially for use with ASCII on NC Machines - might be made of plastic or even very thin metal material in order to be reused many times.

The most common test signal is a series of "RYRYRY" characters, as these form an alternating tone pattern exercising all bits and are easily recognized. Pangrams are also transmitted on RTTY circuits as test messages, the most common one being "The quick brown fox jumps over the lazy dog", and in French circuits, "Voyez le brick géant que j'examine près du wharf"

== Technical specification ==
The original (or "Baudot") radioteletype system is based almost invariably on the Baudot code or ITA-2 5 bit alphabet. The link is based on character asynchronous transmission with 1 start bit and 1, 1.5 or 2 stop bits. Transmitter modulation is normally FSK (F1B). Occasionally, an AFSK signal modulating an RF carrier (A2B, F2B) is used on VHF or UHF frequencies. Standard transmission speeds are 45.45, 50, 75, 100, 150 and 300 baud.

Common carrier shifts are 85 Hz (used on LF and VLF frequencies), 170 Hz, 425 Hz, 450 Hz and 850 Hz, although some stations use non-standard shifts. There are variations of the standard Baudot alphabet to cover languages written in Cyrillic, Arabic, Greek etc., using special techniques.

Some combinations of speed and shift are standardized for specific services using the original radioteletype system:

- Amateur radio transmissions are almost always 45.45 baud – 170 Hz, although 75 baud activity is being promoted by BARTG in the form of 4-hour contests.
- Radio amateurs have experimented with ITA-5 (7-bit ASCII) alphabet transmissions at 110 baud – 170 Hz.
- NATO military services use 75 or 100 baud – 850 Hz.
- A few naval stations still use RTTY without encryption for CARB (channel availability broadcasts).
- Commercial, diplomatic and weather services prefer 50 baud – 425 or 450 Hz.
- Russian (and in the past, Soviet Union) merchant marine communications use 50 baud – 170 Hz.
- RTTY transmissions on LF and VLF frequencies use a narrow shift of 85 Hz, due to the limited bandwidth of the antennas.

== Early amateur radioteletype history ==
After World War II, amateur radio operators in the U.S. started to receive obsolete but usable Teletype Model 26 equipment from commercial operators with the understanding that this equipment would not be used for or returned to commercial service. "The Amateur Radioteletype and VHF Society" was founded in 1946 in Woodside, NY. This organization soon changed its name to "The VHF Teletype Society" and started US amateur radio operations on 2 meters using audio frequency shift keying (AFSK). The first two-way amateur radio teletype contact (QSO) of record took place in May 1946 between Dave Winters, W2AUF, Brooklyn, NY, and W2BFD, John Evans Williams, Woodside Long Island, NY. On the west coast, amateur RTTY also started on 2 meters. Operation on 80 meters, 40 meters and the other High Frequency (HF) amateur radio bands was initially accomplished using make and break keying since frequency shift keying (FSK) was not yet authorized.

In early 1949, the first American transcontinental two-way RTTY contact was accomplished on 11 meters using AFSK between Tom McMullen (W1QVF) operating at W1AW and Johnny Agalsoff, W6PSW. The stations effected partial contact on January 30, 1949, and repeated more successfully on January 31. On February 1, 1949, the stations exchanged solid print congratulatory message traffic and rag-chewed. Earlier, on January 23, 1949, William T. Knott, W2QGH, Larchmont, NY, had been able to make rough copy of W6PSW's test transmissions. While contacts could be accomplished, it was quickly realized that FSK was technically superior to make and break keying. Due to the efforts of Merrill Swan, W6AEE, of "The RTTY Society of Southern California" publisher of RTTY and Wayne Green, W2NSD, of CQ Magazine, amateur radio operators successfully petitioned the U.S. Federal Communications Commission (FCC) to amend Part 12 of the Regulations, which was effective on February 20, 1953. The amended Regulations permitted FSK in the non-voice parts of the 80, 40, and 20 meter bands and also specified the use of single channel 60 words-per-minute five unit code corresponding to ITA2. A shift of 850 ± 50 Hz was specified. Amateur radio operators also had to identify their station callsign at the beginning and the end of each transmission and at ten-minute intervals using International Morse code. Use of this wide shift proved to be a problem for amateur radio operations. Commercial operators had already discovered that narrow shift worked best on the HF bands. After investigation and a petition to the FCC, Part 12 was amended, in March 1956, to allow amateur radio operators to use any shift that was 900 Hz or less.

The FCC Notice of Proposed Rule Making (NPRM) that resulted in the authorization of FSK in the amateur high frequency (HF) bands responded to petitions by the American Radio Relay League (ARRL), the National Amateur Radio Council, and a Mr. Robert Weinstein. The NPRM specifically states this, and this information may be found in its entirety in the December 1951 issue of QST Magazine. While The New RTTY Handbook gives ARRL no credit, it was published by CQ Magazine and its author was a CQ columnist (CQ was generally hostile to the ARRL at that time).

The first RTTY Contest was held by the RTTY Society of Southern California from October 31 to November 1, 1953. Named the RTTY Sweepstakes Contest, twenty nine participants exchanged messages that contained a serial number, originating station call, check or RST report of two or three numbers, ARRL section of originator, local time (0000-2400 preferred) and date. Example: NR 23 W0BP CK MINN 1325 FEB 15. By the late 1950s, the contest exchange was expanded to include band used. Example: NR 23 W0BP CK MINN 1325 FEB 15 FORTY METERS. The contest was scored as follows: One point for each message sent and received entirely by RTTY and one point for each message received and acknowledged by RTTY. The final score was computed by multiplying the total number of message points by the number of ARRL sections worked. Two stations could exchange messages again on a different band for added points, but the section multiplier did not increase when the same section was reworked on a different band. Each DXCC entity was counted as an additional ARRL section for RTTY multiplier credit.

A new magazine named RTTY, later renamed RTTY Journal, also published the first listing of stations, mostly located in the continental US, that were interested in RTTY in 1956. Amateur radio operators used this callbook information to contact other operators both inside and outside the United States. For example, the first recorded USA to New Zealand two-way RTTY contact took place in 1956 between W0BP and ZL1WB.

By the late 1950s, new organizations focused on amateur radioteletype started to appear. The "British Amateur Radio Teletype Group", BARTG, now known as the "British Amateur Radio Teledata Group" was formed in June 1959. The Florida RTTY Society was formed in September 1959. Amateur radio operators outside of Canada and the U.S. began to acquire surplus teleprinter and receive permission to get on the air. The first recorded RTTY contact in the U.K. occurred in September 1959 between G2UK and G3CQE. A few weeks later, G3CQE had the first G/VE RTTY QSO with VE7KX. This was quickly followed up by G3CQE QSOs with VK3KF and ZL3HJ. Information on how to acquire surplus teleprinter equipment continued to spread and before long it was possible to work all continents on RTTY.

Amateur radio operators used various equipment designs to get on the air using RTTY in the 1950s and 1960s. Amateurs used their existing receivers for RTTY operation but needed to add a terminal unit, sometimes called a demodulator, to convert the received audio signals to DC signals for the teleprinter.

Most of the terminal unit equipment used for receiving RTTY signals was home built, using designs published in amateur radio publications. These original designs can be divided into two classes of terminal units: audio-type and intermediate frequency converters. The audio-type converters proved to be more popular with amateur radio operators. The Twin City, W2JAV and W2PAT designs were examples of typical terminal units that were used into the middle 1960s. The late 1960s and early 1970s saw the emergence of terminal units designed by W6FFC, such as the TT/L, ST-3, ST-5, and ST-6. These designs were first published in RTTY Journal starting in September 1967 and ending in 1970.

An adaptation of the W6FFC TT/L terminal unit was developed by Keith Petersen, W8SDZ, and it was first published in the RTTY Journal in September 1967. The drafting of the schematic in the article was done by Ralph Leland, W8DLT.

Amateur radio operators needed to modify their transmitters to allow for HF RTTY operation. This was accomplished by adding a frequency shift keyer that used a diode to switch a capacitor in and out of the circuit, shifting the transmitter’s frequency in synchronism with the teleprinter signal changing from mark to space to mark. A very stable transmitter was required for RTTY. The typical frequency multiplication type transmitter that was popular in the 1950s and 1960s would be relatively stable on 80 meters but become progressively less stable on 40 meters, 20 meters, and 15 meters. By the middle 1960s, transmitter designs were updated, mixing a crystal-controlled high frequency oscillator with a variable low frequency oscillator, resulting in better frequency stability across all amateur radio HF bands.

During the early days of Amateur RTTY, the RTTY Worked All Continents Award was conceived by the RTTY Society of Southern California and issued by RTTY Journal. The first amateur radio station to achieve this WAC – RTTY Award was VE7KX. The first stations recognized as having achieved single band WAC RTTY were W1MX (3.5 MHz); DL0TD (7.0 MHz); K3SWZ (14.0 MHz); W0MT (21.0 MHz) and FG7XT (28.0 MHz). The ARRL began issuing WAC RTTY certificates in 1969.

By the early 1970s, amateur radio RTTY had spread around the world and it was finally possible to work more than 100 countries via RTTY. FG7XT was the first amateur radio station to claim to achieve this honor. However, Jean did not submit his QSL cards for independent review. ON4BX, in 1971, was the first amateur radio station to submit his cards to the DX editor of RTTY Journal and to achieve this honor. The ARRL began issuing DXCC RTTY Awards on November 1, 1976. Prior to that date, an award for working 100 countries on RTTY was only available via RTTY Journal.

In the 1950s through the 1970s, "RTTY art" was a popular on-air activity. This consisted of (sometimes very elaborate and artistic) pictures sent over RTTY through the use of lengthy punched tape transmissions and then printed by the receiving station on paper.

On January 7, 1972, the FCC amended Part 97 to allow faster RTTY speeds. Four standard RTTY speeds were authorized, namely, 60 words per minute (wpm) (45 baud), 67 wpm (50 baud), 75 wpm (56.25 baud), and 100 wpm (75 baud). Many amateur radio operators had equipment that was capable of being upgraded to 75 and 100 words per minute by changing teleprinter gears. While there was an initial interest in 100 wpm operation, many amateur radio operators moved back to 60 wpm. Some of the reasons for the failure of 100 wpm HF RTTY included poor operation of improperly maintained mechanical teleprinters, narrow bandwidth terminal units, continued use of 170 Hz shift at 100 wpm, and excessive error rates due to multipath distortion and the nature of ionospheric propagation.

The FCC approved the use of ASCII by amateur radio stations on March 17, 1980 with speeds up to 300 baud from 3.5 MHz to 21.25 MHz and 1200 baud between 28 MHz and 225 MHz. Speeds up to 19.2 kilobaud was authorized on amateur frequencies above 420 MHz.

These symbol rates were later modified:

nominal band wavelength	symbol rate	FCC regulation
12 m and below	300 baud	47 CFR § 97.307 (f)(3)
10 m	1200 baud	47 CFR § 97.307 (f)(4)
6 m & 2 m	19.6 kilobaud	47 CFR § 97.307 (f)(5)
1.25 m & 70 cm	56 kilobaud	47 CFR § 97.307 (f)(6)
33 cm and above	[not specified]	47 CFR § 97.307 (f)(7)

The requirement for amateur radio operators in the U.S. to identify their station callsign at the beginning and the end of each digital transmission, and at ten-minute intervals using International Morse code, was finally lifted by the FCC on June 15, 1983.

== Comparison with other modes ==
RTTY has a typical baud rate for Amateur operation of 45.45 baud (approximately 60 words per minute). It remains popular as a "keyboard to keyboard" mode in Amateur Radio. RTTY has declined in commercial popularity as faster, more reliable alternative data modes have become available, using satellite or other connections.

For its transmission speed, RTTY has low spectral efficiency. The typical RTTY signal with 170 Hz shift at 45.45 baud requires around 250 Hz receiver bandwidth, more than double that required by PSK31. In theory, at this baud rate, the shift size can be decreased to 22.725 Hz, reducing the overall band footprint substantially. Because RTTY, using either AFSK or FSK modulation, produces a waveform with constant power, a transmitter does not need to use a linear amplifier, which is required for many digital transmission modes. A more efficient Class C amplifier may be used.

RTTY, using either AFSK or FSK modulation, is moderately resistant to vagaries of HF propagation and interference, however modern digital modes, such as MFSK, use Forward Error Correction to provide much better data reliability.

== Primary users ==
Principally, the primary users are those who need robust shortwave communications. Examples are:

- All military departments, all over the world (using cryptography)
- Diplomatic services all over the world (using cryptography)
- Weather reports are transmitted by the US Coast Guard nearly continuously
- RTTY systems are also fielded by amateur radio operators, and are popular for long-distance contacts

One regular service transmitting RTTY meteorological information is the German Meteorological Service (Deutscher Wetterdienst or DWD). The DWD regularly transmit two programs on various frequencies on LF and HF in standard RTTY (ITA-2 alphabet). The list of callsigns, frequencies, baud rates and shifts are as follows:

Callsign	Frequency	speed/shift
DDH47	147.3 kHz	50 baud/85 Hz
DDK2	4583 kHz	50 baud/450 Hz
DDH7	7646 kHz	50 baud/450 Hz
DDK9	10100.8 kHz	50 baud/450 Hz
DDH9	11039 kHz	50 baud/450 Hz
DDH8	14467.3 kHz	50 baud/450 Hz

The DWD signals can be easily received in Europe, North Africa and parts of North America.

== See also ==
=== Related technical references ===
- Asynchronous serial communication
- Modem
- Teleprinter
- Telex
- Text messaging
- Types of radio emissions
- UART

=== Digital HF radio communications systems ===
- ACARS, used by commercial aviation – packet based
- CLOVER2000 developed by HAL company, USA, for Radio Amateur application
- Hellschreiber, a FAX-RTTY hybrid, very old system from the 1930s
- MFSK including COQUELET, PICCOLO and Olivia MFSK, also referred to generically as Polytone
- MT63, developed and used by Radio Amateurs and some government agencies
- Navtex, used for maritime weather reports, with FEC error control code using the SITOR-B system
- PSK31 and PSK63 developed and used by Radio Amateurs
- PACTOR, a packet SITOR variant, developed by Radio Amateurs in Germany
- AX.25, the original digital packet radio standard developed by Amateurs
- Automatic Packet Reporting System, built on top of AX.25, used by Amateurs and Emergency services and which includes GPS Positioning
- Q15X25, a Radio Amateur created packet format (AX25), similar to the commercial X25 standard
- Fast Simple QSO or FSQ, an HF mode developed by Radio Amateurs for us in NVIS and sunrise/sunset conditions.
- SITOR, (SImplex Teleprinting Over Radio) a commercial RTTY variant with error control (the Radio Amateur version is called AMTOR)
- Sailmail, a commercial HF mail system
- WSJT, a computer program used for weak-signal radio communication between amateur radio operators
