= PACTOR =

Digital radio modulation mode

PACTOR is a radio modulation mode used by amateur radio operators, marine radio stations, military or government users such as the United States Department of Homeland Security & its cybersecurity agency CISA, and radio stations in isolated areas to send and receive digital information via radio.

PACTOR is an evolution of both AMTOR and packet radio; its name is a portmanteau of these two technologies' names. PACTOR uses a combination of simple FSK modulation, and the ARQ protocol for error detection and data throughput. Generational improvements to PACTOR include PACTOR II, PACTOR III, and PACTOR IV which are capable of higher speed transmission. As PACTOR was designed to operate as a shortwave HF band radio, it commonly operates at frequencies between 3 MHz and 30 MHz.

== History ==
PACTOR (Latin: The mediator) was developed by Special Communications Systems GmbH (SCS) and released to the public in 1991.

PACTOR was developed in order to improve the reception of digital data when the received signal was weak or noisy. It combines the bandwidth efficiency of packet radio with the error-correction (CRC) and automatic repeat request (ARQ) of AMTOR. Amateur radio operators were instrumental in developing and implementing these digital modes.

== Current uses ==
PACTOR radio equipment consists of an HF transceiver, a computer and a terminal node controller. Software running on the computer drives the terminal node controller. The most commonly used amateur program for this purpose is Airmail.

PACTOR is used by Amateur Bulletin board system operators to exchange public messages, and open conversations across the world. It is also used by the NTSD (digital) portion of the ARRL's National Traffic System (NTS) to pass digital ARRL Radiograms. Newer PACTOR modes are used to transfer large binary data files and Internet e-mail, particularly via the Winlink global e-mail system.

The SailMail network transfers e-mail on behalf of marine stations.

== Technical characteristics ==
PACTOR is a set of standardized modes used by radio operators for FSK radioteletype transfer of digital information over shortwave bands.

Effective radio-frequency communications over long distances over hostile radio paths require that special attention be paid to the rate at which data is repeated and error correction.

To reduce the amount of data sent, on-line data compression is utilized, along with memory ARQ error correction.

PACTOR utilizes time-division duplexing for bidirectional, half-duplex communication. To do this, it utilizes a single frequency to send and receive data by alternating transmission time, usually with 1.25 to 1.4-second cycles; this is opposed to using separate frequencies for sending and receiving data (Frequency-division duplexing).

Depending on the version of PACTOR protocol used and the radio-frequency conditions, PACTOR transmission speeds range from 20 to 5200 bits per second (bit/s; net rate) or 9000 bit/s gross rate utilizing speed 10 (32-QAM).

The International Telecommunication Union (ITU) emission designators:

- Pactor I is 340HJ2D or 440HJ2D (at a symbol rate up to 200 symbols per second).
- Pactor II is 450HJ2D (at a symbol rate of 100 symbols per second).
- Pactor III is 2K20J2D (at a symbol rate of 100 symbols per second).
- Pactor IV is 2K20J2D or 2K40J2D (at a symbol rate up to 1800 symbols per second).

== Availability and monitoring ==
A robust network of PACTOR stations has been established to transfer data between radio stations and the Internet, extending Internet access to sea-based and other isolated users, led by volunteers involved with Winlink, under the auspicies of ARSFI (a Florida-based non-profit organization).

Pactor modes other than level 1 (P1) are not open source, but are publicly documented and can be monitored and decoded easily over the air by third parties using free Raspberry Pi software ("PMON for Raspberry Pi") or PMON utility on the modem itself.

== See also ==
- Shortwave
- Radioteletype
- Winmor
