= Varicode =

Varicode is a self-synchronizing code for use in PSK31. It supports all ASCII characters, but the characters used most frequently in English have shorter codes. The space between characters is indicated by a 00 sequence, an implementation of Fibonacci coding. Originally created for speeding up real-time keyboard-to-keyboard exchanges over low bandwidth links, Varicode is freely available.

== Limitations ==
- Varicode provides somewhat weaker compression in languages other than English that use same characters as in English.

== Varicode table ==
=== Control characters ===
Varicode	Oct	Dec	Hex	Abbr	Description
1010101011	000	0	00	NUL	Null character
1011011011	001	1	01	SOH	Start of Header
1011101101	002	2	02	STX	Start of Text
1101110111	003	3	03	ETX	End of Text
1011101011	004	4	04	EOT	End of Transmission
1101011111	005	5	05	ENQ	Enquiry
1011101111	006	6	06	ACK	Acknowledgment
1011111101	007	7	07	BEL	Bell
1011111111	010	8	08	BS	Backspace
11101111	011	9	09	HT	Horizontal Tab
11101	012	10	0A	LF	Line feed
1101101111	013	11	0B	VT	Vertical Tab
1011011101	014	12	0C	FF	Form feed
11111	015	13	0D	CR	Carriage return
1101110101	016	14	0E	SO	Shift Out
1110101011	017	15	0F	SI	Shift In
1011110111	020	16	10	DLE	Data Link Escape
1011110101	021	17	11	DC1	Device Control 1 (XON)
1110101101	022	18	12	DC2	Device Control 2
1110101111	023	19	13	DC3	Device Control 3 (XOFF)
1101011011	024	20	14	DC4	Device Control 4
1101101011	025	21	15	NAK	Negative Acknowledgement
1101101101	026	22	16	SYN	Synchronous Idle
1101010111	027	23	17	ETB	End of Trans. Block
1101111011	030	24	18	CAN	Cancel
1101111101	031	25	19	EM	End of Medium
1110110111	032	26	1A	SUB	Substitute
1101010101	033	27	1B	ESC	Escape
1101011101	034	28	1C	FS	File Separator
1110111011	035	29	1D	GS	Group Separator
1011111011	036	30	1E	RS	Record Separator
1101111111	037	31	1F	US	Unit Separator
1110110101	177	127	7F	DEL	Delete

=== Printable characters ===
Varicode	Oct	Dec	Hex	Glyph
1	040	32	20	SP
111111111	041	33	21	!
101011111	042	34	22	"
111110101	043	35	23	#
111011011	044	36	24	$
1011010101	045	37	25	%
1010111011	046	38	26	&
101111111	047	39	27	'
11111011	050	40	28	(
11110111	051	41	29	)
101101111	052	42	2A	*
111011111	053	43	2B	+
1110101	054	44	2C	,
110101	055	45	2D	-
1010111	056	46	2E	.
110101111	057	47	2F	/
10110111	060	48	30	0
10111101	061	49	31	1
11101101	062	50	32	2
11111111	063	51	33	3
101110111	064	52	34	4
101011011	065	53	35	5
101101011	066	54	36	6
110101101	067	55	37	7
110101011	070	56	38	8
110110111	071	57	39	9
11110101	072	58	3A	:
110111101	073	59	3B	;
111101101	074	60	3C	<
1010101	075	61	3D	=
111010111	076	62	3E	>
1010101111	077	63	3F	?

Varicode	Oct	Dec	Hex	Glyph
1010111101	100	64	40	@
1111101	101	65	41	A
11101011	102	66	42	B
10101101	103	67	43	C
10110101	104	68	44	D
1110111	105	69	45	E
11011011	106	70	46	F
11111101	107	71	47	G
101010101	110	72	48	H
1111111	111	73	49	I
111111101	112	74	4A	J
101111101	113	75	4B	K
11010111	114	76	4C	L
10111011	115	77	4D	M
11011101	116	78	4E	N
10101011	117	79	4F	O
11010101	120	80	50	P
111011101	121	81	51	Q
10101111	122	82	52	R
1101111	123	83	53	S
1101101	124	84	54	T
101010111	125	85	55	U
110110101	126	86	56	V
101011101	127	87	57	W
101110101	130	88	58	X
101111011	131	89	59	Y
1010101101	132	90	5A	Z
111110111	133	91	5B	[
111101111	134	92	5C	\
111111011	135	93	5D	]
1010111111	136	94	5E	
101101101	137	95	5F	_

Varicode	Oct	Dec	Hex	Glyph
1011011111	140	96	60	'
1011	141	97	61	a
1011111	142	98	62	b
101111	143	99	63	c
101101	144	100	64	d
11	145	101	65	e
111101	146	102	66	f
1011011	147	103	67	g
101011	150	104	68	h
1101	151	105	69	i
111101011	152	106	6A	j
10111111	153	107	6B	k
11011	154	108	6C	l
111011	155	109	6D	m
1111	156	110	6E	n
111	157	111	6F	o
111111	160	112	70	p
110111111	161	113	71	q
10101	162	114	72	r
10111	163	115	73	s
101	164	116	74	t
110111	165	117	75	u
1111011	166	118	76	v
1101011	167	119	77	w
11011111	170	120	78	x
1011101	171	121	79	y
111010101	172	122	7A	z
1010110111	173	123	7B	{
110111011	174	124	7C	|
1010110101	175	125	7D	}
1011010111	176	126	7E	~

=== Character lengths ===
Beginning with the single-bit code "1", valid varicode values may be formed by prefixing a "1" or "10" to a shorter code. Thus, the number of codes of length n is equal to the Fibonacci number F_{n}. Varicode uses the 88 values of lengths up to 9 bits, and 40 of the 55 codes of length 10.

As transmitted, the codes are two bits longer due to the trailing delimiter 00.

ASCII characters by varicode length
Bits	Codes	Characters
1	1	SP
2	1	e
3	2	o t
4	3	a i n
5	5	LF CR l r s
6	8	c d f h m p u
7	13	, . = A E I S T b g v w y
8	21	HT ( ) 0 1 2 3 : B C D F G L M N O P R k x
9	34	! " # $ ' * + / 4 5 6 7 8 9 ; < > H J K Q U V W X Y [ \ ] _ j q z |
10	40	NUL SOH STX ETX EOT ENQ ACK BEL BS VT FF SO SI DLE DC1 DC2 DC3 DC4 NAK SYN ETB CAN EOM SUB ESC FS GS RS US % & ? @ Z ^ ` { } ~ DEL
