= Amateur radio =

Non-commercial use of the radio spectrum

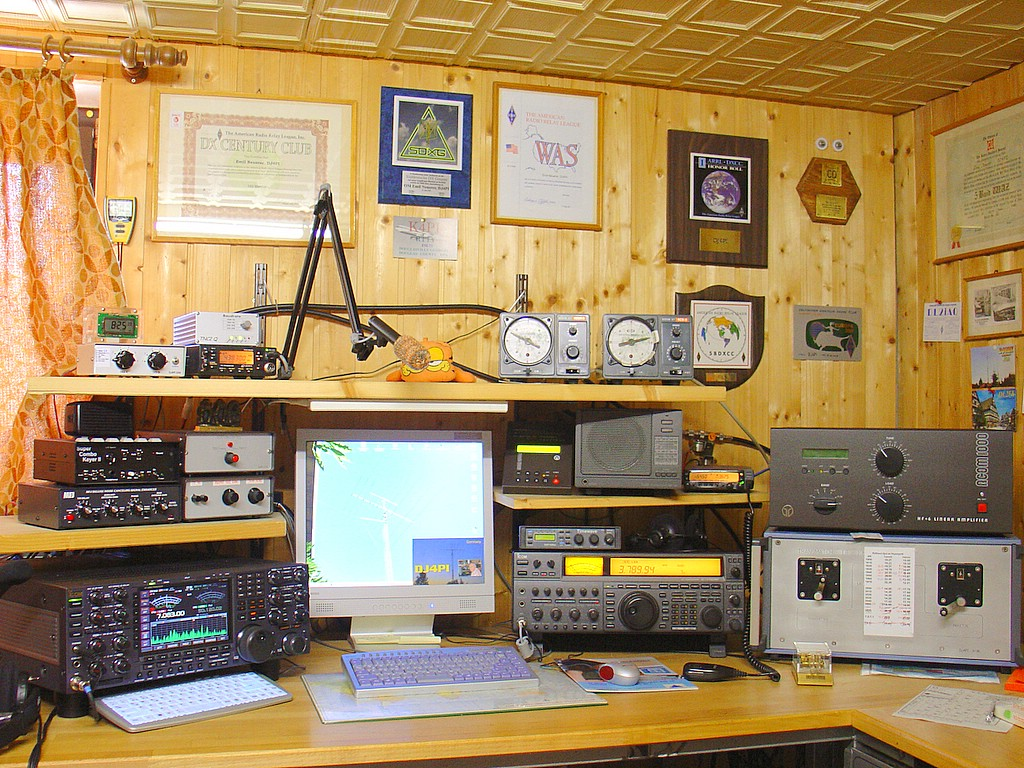
Amateur radio station with transceivers, amplifiers, and a computer for digital modes. On the wall are awards, certificates, and QSL cards from foreign stations

Amateur radio, also known as ham radio, is the use of specific bands and frequencies within the radio spectrum for non-commercial communication, technical experimentation, self-training, recreation, radiosport, and emergency communications. A surge of popular interest in radio experimentation in the early 20th century necessitated that parts of the radio spectrum be allocated to non-professionals. In 1927 a radio amateur was defined as "a duly authorized person interested in radioelectric practice with a purely personal aim and without pecuniary interest", meaning without monetary or similar reward. The definition distinguished amateur activity from commercial broadcasting, public safety services, and professional two-way radio uses such as maritime, aviation, and taxi communication.

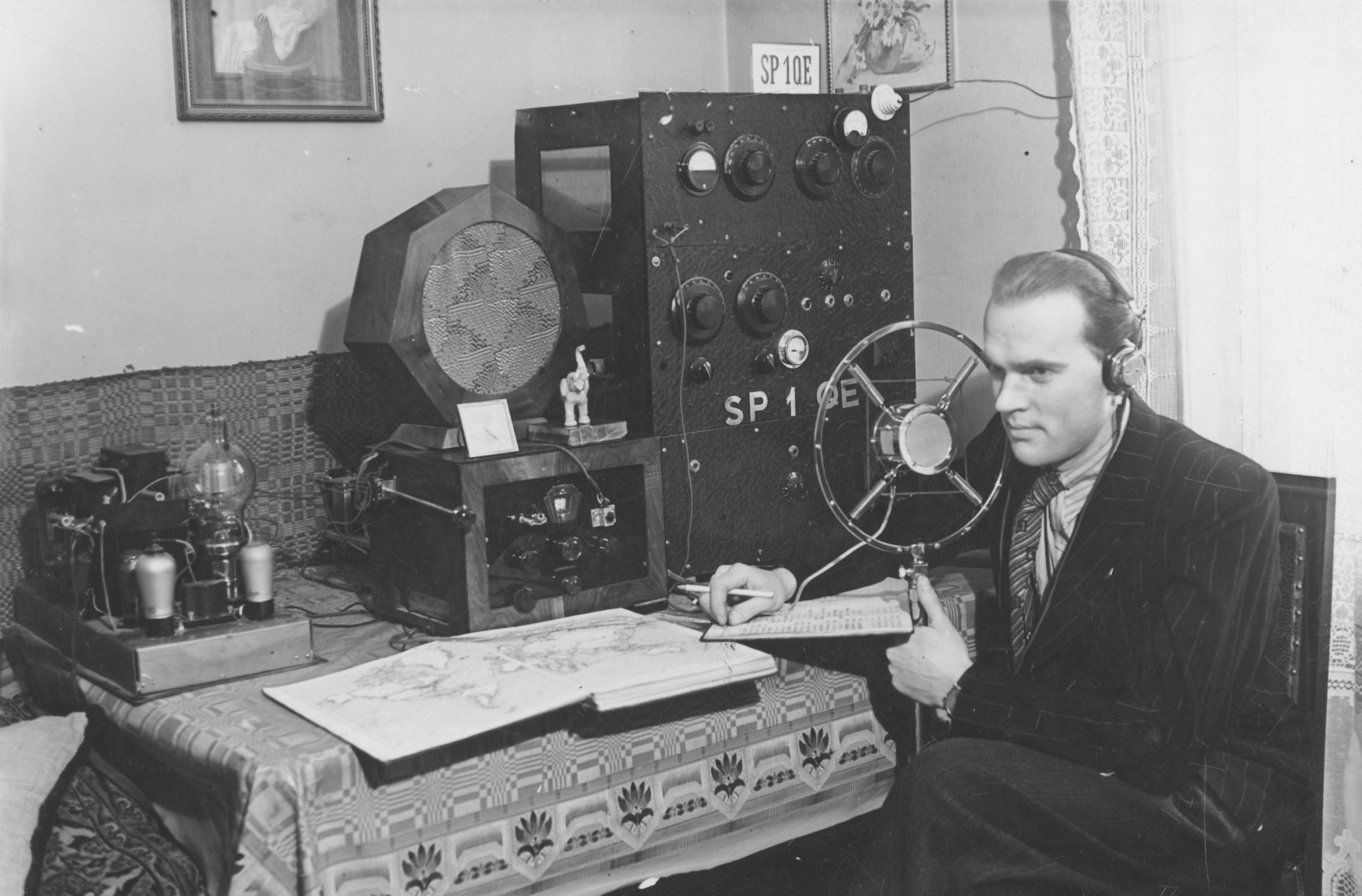
Polish amateur radio station SP1QE with a 1930s vacuum tube transmitter and receiver

The amateur radio service (amateur service and amateur-satellite service) is established by the International Telecommunication Union (ITU) through its Radio Regulations. National governments set technical and operational rules for transmissions and issue individual station licences with unique call signs. Call signs must be used in transmissions, at least every ten minutes and at the end of the conversation. Amateur radio operators must hold an amateur radio licence, granted after an examination that tests knowledge of radio theory, electronics, and national regulations.

Operators are authorised to transmit on frequency ranges allocated internationally as the amateur radio bands. Within these bands they may use any frequency, though some are restricted to particular modes of voice, text, image, or data communications. Additionally, some frequencies are restricted to lower maximum power outputs. This allows communication locally, nationally, worldwide, and even with stations in space. In many countries, operators may also exchange radio communications between computers or transceivers connected through virtual private networks on the Internet.

Amateur radio is represented by the International Amateur Radio Union (IARU), which has three regions and includes national amateur radio societies in most countries. In 2011 the American Radio Relay League (the U.S. national society) estimated that about 2 million people worldwide were active in amateur radio. About 830,000 amateur radio stations are in Region 2 (the Americas), about 750,000 in Region 3 (South and East Asia and the Pacific), and about 400,000 in Region 1 (Europe, the Middle East, the CIS and Africa). Radio amateurs have been credited with a number of advances, notably the discovery of skywave propagation.

== History ==
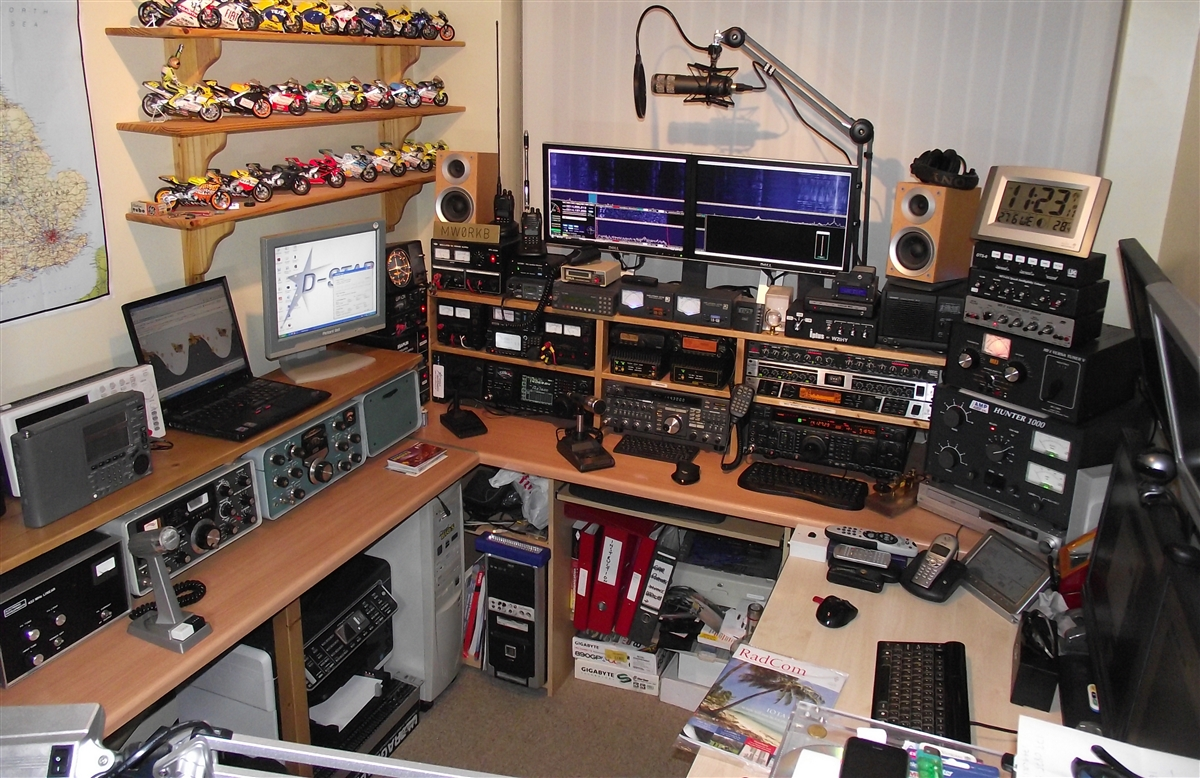
An amateur radio station in Wales. Multiple transceivers are employed for different bands and modes. Computers are used for control, data modes, SDR, RTTY and logging.

The origins of amateur radio can be traced to the late 19th century, but amateur radio as practised today began in the early 20th century. The First Annual Official Wireless Blue Book of the Wireless Association of America, produced in 1909, contains a list of amateur radio stations. This radio callbook lists wireless telegraph stations in Canada and the United States, including 89 amateur radio stations. As with radio in general, amateur radio was associated with various amateur experimenters and hobbyists. Amateur radio enthusiasts have significantly contributed to science, engineering, industry, and social services. Research by amateur operators has founded new industries, like experimentation with quartz piezoelectric resonators from 1924 until about 1934, built economies, empowered nations, and saved lives in times of emergency. Ham radio can also be used in the classroom to teach English, map skills, geography, math, science, and computer skills.

=== Ham radio ===
The term ham was originally a pejorative, used in professional wired telegraphy during the 19th century to mock operators with poor Morse code-sending skills ("ham-fisted"). This term continued to be used after the invention of radio and the subsequent proliferation of amateur experimentation with wireless telegraphy; among both land-based and sea-based professional radio telegraphers, ham amateurs were considered a nuisance. The use of ham to mean amateurish or unskilled survives to this day in another discipline— i.e. ham actor.

The amateur radio community subsequently reclaimed the word as a label of pride, and by the mid-20th century it had lost its pejorative meaning. Although not an acronym or initialism, it is occasionally written as "HAM" in capital letters.

== Activity and practice ==
Amateur radio combines communication, technical experimentation, and recreation. Operators take part in contests, provide emergency service, build and modify equipment, and use transmission modes ranging from traditional Morse code to modern digital protocols.

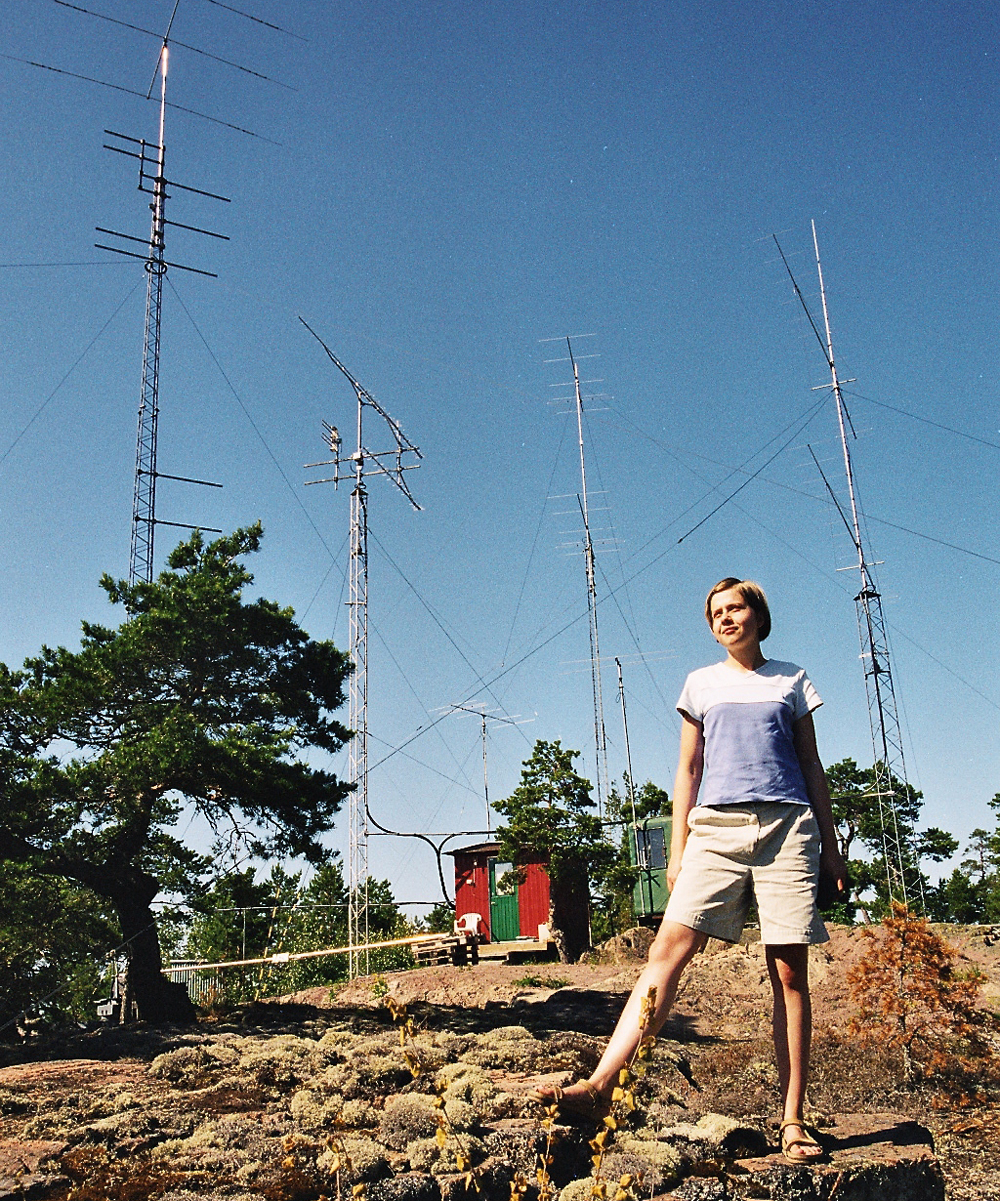
Amateur operator with antennas in Åland

=== Community and social use ===
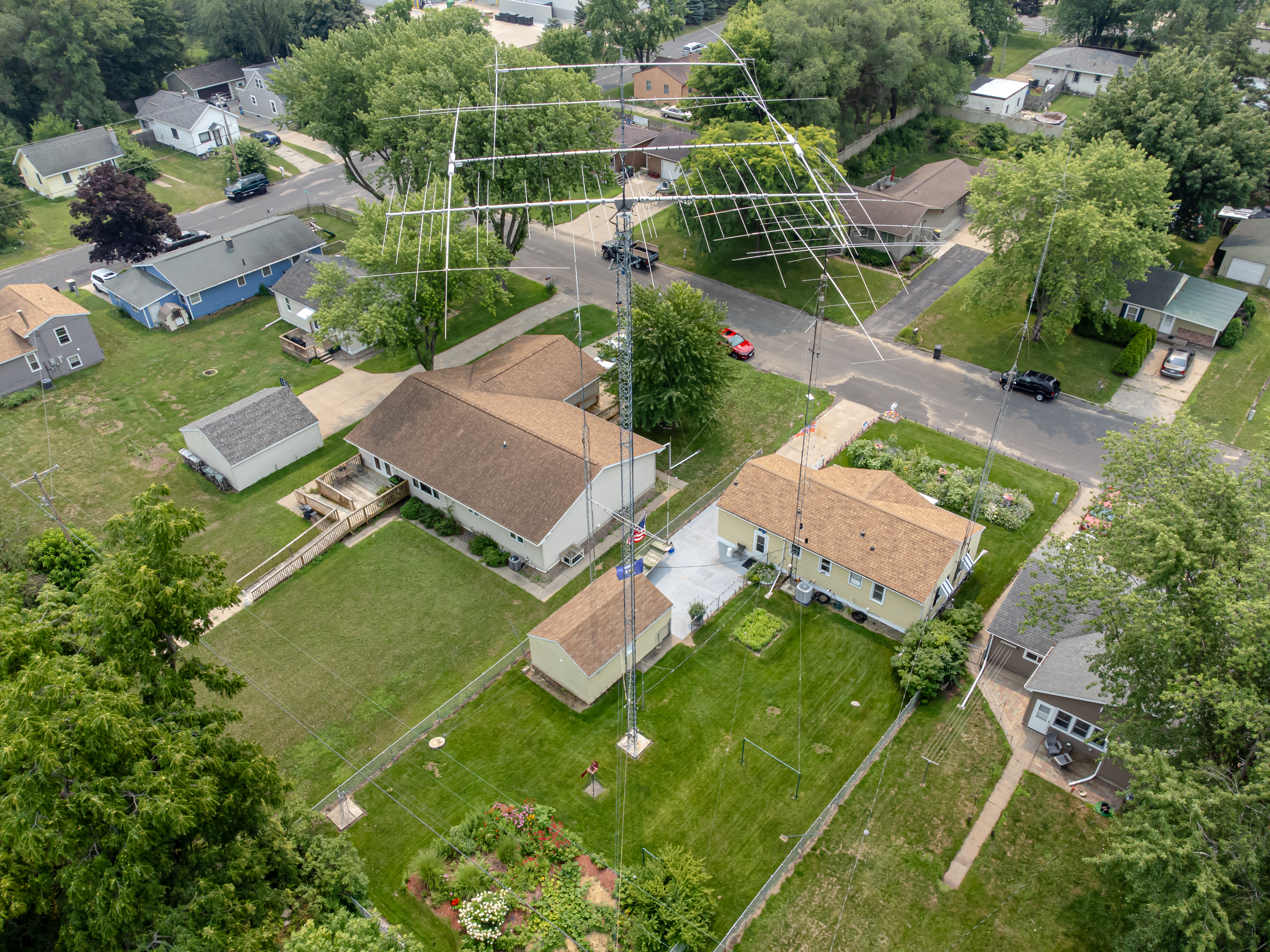
Backyard amateur radio antenna farm

Operators often join conversational groups and take part in scheduled on-air meetings called nets, coordinated by a net control station. Nets may provide training for emergencies, operate as informal discussions, or focus on specialised topics.

With battery- or generator-powered equipment, operators frequently provide communication during natural disasters when commercial services are unavailable.

Competitive activities include contests to contact as many stations as possible in a set period, and operating awards such as Summits on the Air, Worked All States, and Jamboree on the Air. Operators also contribute to citizen science by collecting propagation data and supporting atmospheric science research.

== Radiotelephony ==
The principal voice modes are frequency modulation (FM), single sideband (SSB), and amplitude modulation (AM). FM offers high audio quality, SSB is efficient for long-distance use, and AM continues among users of vintage amateur radio equipment.

== Radiotelegraphy ==
Radiotelegraphy using International Morse code, or continuous wave (CW), is one of the oldest modes in amateur radio. Although largely replaced in professional services, it remains in use on shortwave bands because it functions under weak-signal conditions and employs internationally understood codes such as the Q code. CW is also used by hobbyists who build their own equipment (home construction) and by operators engaged in low-power operation, as CW transmitters are simple to construct and weak signals can often be received by ear.

Until 2003, Morse code proficiency was required under international regulations for access to frequencies below 30 MHz. The requirement was withdrawn in the United States in 2007. (Note: The Federal Communications Commission (FCC) officially ended the Morse code proficiency test for all amateur radio license classes on February 23, 2007. The transition occurred in several stages over the preceding decades: 1991: The FCC first introduced a "no-code" Technician Class license, though code proficiency was still required to access frequencies below 30 MHz. 2000: The requirement for higher-level licenses (General and Amateur Extra) was standardized and reduced to a single speed of 5 words per minute (WPM). 2003: The International Telecommunication Union (ITU) modified international regulations, leaving it to individual countries to decide if Morse code should remain a requirement. December 15, 2006: The FCC released the official Report and Order announcing the total elimination of the Morse code exam. February 23, 2007: The new rules became effective, allowing applicants to earn any class of license by passing only the written theory examinations.)

=== Digital and computer-assisted modes ===
Personal computers have enabled new digital transmission modes. Radioteletype (RTTY), once operated by mechanical devices, is now handled in software. Packet radio, developed in the 1970s, uses protocols such as AX.25 and TCP/IP. Later modes including PSK31 and FT8 allow efficient low-signal communication on shortwave bands.

Radio over IP (RoIP) applies Internet-based telephony techniques to radio. EchoLink and the Internet Radio Linking Project link repeaters and operators worldwide.

Other specialised modes support weak-signal communication. Automatic link establishment (ALE) maintains networks on high-frequency bands, while the WSJT suite supports meteor scatter and moonbounce.

=== Television and repeater systems ===
Fast-scan amateur television (ATV) adapts consumer video equipment to transmit images. It typically operates on the 70 cm (420–450 MHz) but may also use the 33 cm and higher frequencies. Because of wide bandwidth requirements, ATV usually covers 30–100 km (20–60 mi). Linked repeater systems extend this range to several hundred kilometres. Repeaters are often located on high ground or towers and may be linked by other amateur bands, landlines, or the Internet.

=== Space and atmospheric propagation ===
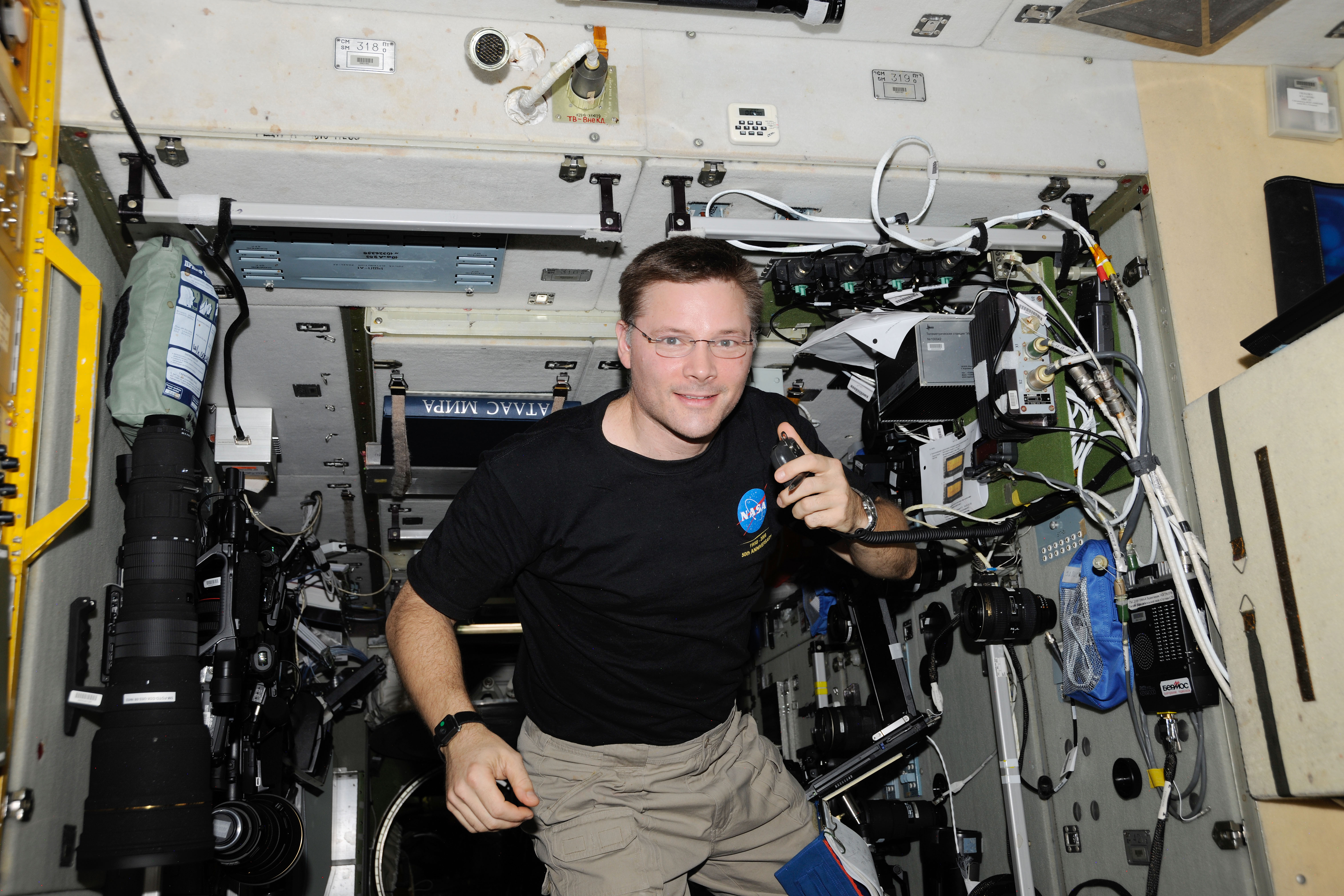
NASA astronaut Doug Wheelock using amateur radio aboard the International Space Station

Operators can use amateur radio satellites, sometimes with only a hand-held transceiver. Natural reflectors such as the Moon, the aurora borealis, and meteor trails are also used. Licensed astronauts have also made contacts from the International Space Station through the ARISS programme.

== Licensing ==
Because radio signals can propagate across national borders, amateur radio is regulated by governments under international frameworks. National requirements generally follow standards set by the International Telecommunication Union (ITU) and World Radiocommunication Conferences.

Most countries require candidates to pass an examination that tests electronics, radio propagation, operating practices, and regulations. Licensing grants access to a broader portion of the spectrum, additional communication modes, and higher transmitter power than unlicensed personal radio services such as CB, FRS, or PMR446.

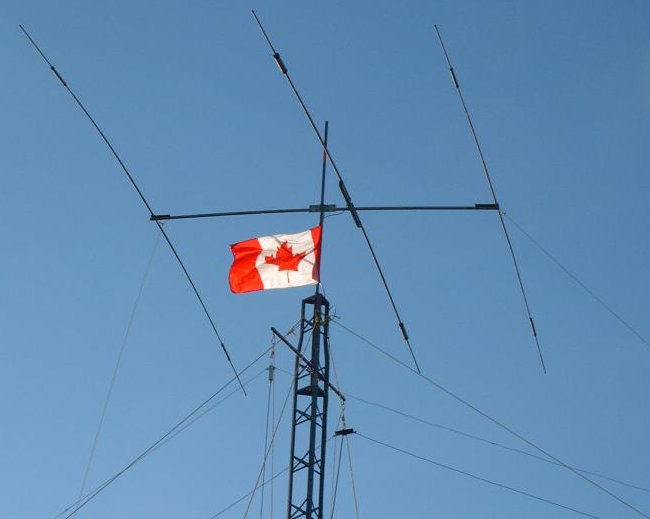
The top of a tower supporting a Yagi–Uda antenna and several wire antennas, along with a Canadian flag

Examination systems often include several levels, each granting wider frequency access and higher power limits. In the United Kingdom and Australia, entry-level candidates used to have to complete a practical skills test to obtain the Foundation Licence, the first of three licensing stages.

Each licensee is normally assigned a unique call sign. Some countries issue additional station licences, or recognise club and organisational licences.

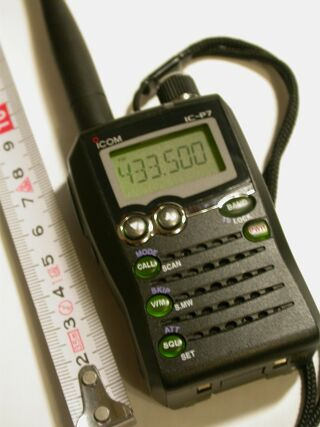
A handheld VHF/UHF transceiver

Licences are generally valid only in the issuing country or in states with reciprocal agreements. In some jurisdictions, a licence is also required to purchase or possess amateur radio equipment.

In the United States, the Federal Communications Commission (FCC) issues three licence classes: Technician, General, and Amateur Extra. Examinations are administered by accredited Volunteer Examiners through the FCC's Volunteer Examiner Coordinator system. Higher licence classes provide access to more frequency bands and higher transmitter power. The tests cover regulations, operating practices, electronics theory, equipment design, and safety. Morse code is no longer tested. Licences are valid for ten years, and the national question pools are published in advance and updated every four years.

=== Licensing requirements ===
Prospective amateur radio operators are examined on understanding of the key concepts of electronics, radio equipment, antennas, radio propagation, RF safety, and the radio regulations of the government granting the license. These examinations are sets of questions typically posed in either a short answer or multiple-choice format. Examinations can be administered by bureaucrats, non-paid certified examiners, or previously licensed amateur radio operators.

The ease with which an individual can acquire an amateur radio license varies from country to country. In some countries, examinations may be offered only once or twice a year in the national capital and can be inordinately bureaucratic (for example in India) or challenging because some amateurs must undergo difficult security approval (as in Iran). Currently, only Yemen and North Korea do not issue amateur radio licenses to their citizens. Some developing countries, especially those in Africa, Asia, and Latin America, require the payment of annual license fees that can be prohibitively expensive for most of their citizens. A few small countries may not have a national licensing process and may instead require prospective amateur radio operators to take the licensing examinations of a foreign country. In countries with the largest numbers of amateur radio licensees, such as Japan, the United States, Thailand, Canada, and most of the countries in Europe, there are frequent license examinations opportunities in major cities.

Granting a separate license to a club or organization generally requires that an individual with a current and valid amateur radio license who is in good standing with the telecommunications authority assumes responsibility for any operations conducted under the club license or club call sign. A few countries may issue special licenses to novices or beginners that do not assign the individual a call sign but instead require the newly licensed individual to operate from stations licensed to a club or organization for a period of time before a higher class of license can be acquired.

=== Reciprocal licensing ===
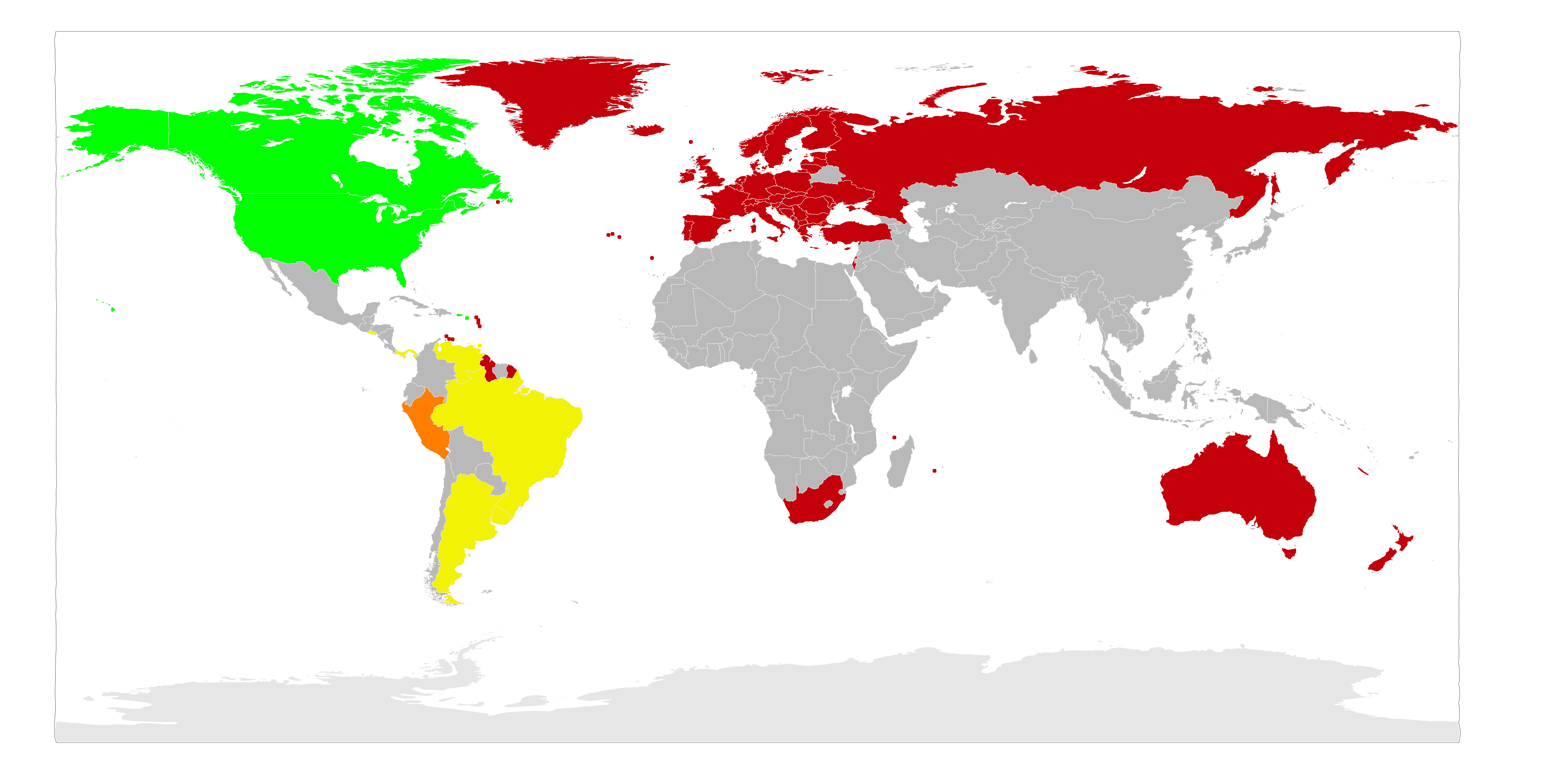
Map of amateur radio reciprocal licensing agreements. CEPT members IARP members CEPT and IARP USA–Canada treaty, CEPT, and IARP

A reciprocal licensing agreement between two countries allows licensed amateur radio operators from one country to operate stations in the other without obtaining a new licence. In some cases, visiting operators may be issued a temporary local licence and call sign.

Requirements vary by jurisdiction. Some countries have bilateral or multilateral agreements that harmonise conditions, while others have no reciprocal arrangements. Regional organisations, such as the Organization of American States, facilitate reciprocity through treaties, including the Inter-American Amateur Radio Service Convention.

=== Newcomers ===
Many people start their involvement in amateur radio on social media or by finding a local club. Clubs often provide information about licensing, local operating practices, and technical advice. Newcomers also often study independently by purchasing books or other materials, sometimes with the help of a mentor, teacher, or friend. In North America, established amateurs who help newcomers are often referred to as "Elmers", as coined by Rodney Newkirk (W9BRD), within the ham community. In addition, many countries have national amateur radio societies which encourage newcomers and work with government communications regulation authorities for the benefit of all radio amateurs. The oldest of these societies is the Wireless Institute of Australia, formed in 1910; other notable societies are the Radio Society of Great Britain, the American Radio Relay League, Radio Amateurs of Canada, Bangladesh NGOs Network for Radio and Communication, the New Zealand Association of Radio Transmitters and South African Radio League. (See Category:Amateur radio organizations)

=== Call signs ===
An amateur radio operator uses a call sign on the air to legally identify the operator or station. In some countries, the call sign assigned to the station must always be used, whereas in other countries, the call sign of either the operator or the station may be used. In certain jurisdictions, an operator may also select a "vanity" call sign although these must also conform to the issuing government's allocation and structure used for amateur radio call signs. Some jurisdictions require a fee to obtain a vanity call sign; in others, such as the UK, a fee is not required and the vanity call sign may be selected when the license is applied for. The FCC in the U.S. discontinued its fee for vanity call sign applications in September 2015, but reinstated it at $35 in 2022.

Call sign structure as prescribed by the ITU consists of three parts which break down as follows, using the call sign ZS1NAT as an example:

ZS	The first part may be one or two letters (or a single digit followed by a single letter); it shows the country from which the call sign originates and may also indicate the license class. (This call sign is licensed in South Africa.)
1	The second part is always a single digit that appears as the second or third character, and always follows a letter; it normally gives the subdivision of the country or territory indicated in the first part (this one refers to the Western Cape).
NAT	The third part is a set of one, two, or three letters that immediately follows the digit in the second part (the digit in the second or third character); it uniquely identifies the holder of the license. (In the examples below, the third part is represented by "xxx".)

The combination of the three parts identifies the specific transmitting station, and the station's identification (its call sign) is determined by the license held by its operator. In the case of commercial stations and amateur club stations, the operator is a corporation; in the case of amateur radio operators, the license-holder is a resident of the country identified by the first part of the call sign.

Many countries do not follow the ITU convention for the second-part digit. In the United Kingdom the original calls G0xxx, G2xxx, G3xxx, G4xxx, were Full (A) License holders along with the last M0xxx full call signs issued by the City & Guilds examination authority in December 2003. Additional Full Licenses were originally granted to (B) Licenses with G1xxx, G6xxx, G7xxx, G8xxx and 1991 onward with M1xxx call signs. The newer three-level Intermediate License holders are assigned 2E0xxx and 2E1xxx, and the basic Foundation License holders are granted call signs M3xxx, M6xxx or M7xxx.

Instead of using numbers, in the U.K. the second letter after the initial 'G' or 'M' identifies the station's location; for example, a call sign G7OOE becomes GM7OOE and M0RDM becomes MM0RDM when the license holder is operating their station in Scotland. Prefix GM & MM are Scotland, GW & MW are Wales, GI & MI are Northern Ireland, GD & MD are the Isle of Man, GJ & MJ are Jersey and GU & MU are Guernsey. Intermediate licence call signs are slightly different. They begin 2z0 and 2z1 where the z is replaced with one of the country letters, as above. For example 2M0 and 2M1 are Scotland, 2W0 and 2W1 are Wales and so on. The exception however is for England, whose letter would be 'E'; however, letter 'E' is used, but only in intermediate-level call signs, and perplexingly never by the advanced licenses. For example 2E0 & 2E1 are used whereas the call signs beginning 'G' or 'M' for foundation and full licenses never use the 'E'.

In the United States, for non-vanity licenses, the numeral indicates the geographical district the holder resided in when the license was first issued. Prior to 1978, US hams were required to obtain a new call sign if they moved out of their geographic district.

In Canada, call signs start with VA, VE, VY, VO, and CY. Call signs starting with 'V' end with a number after to indicate the political region; whereas the prefix CY indicates geographic islands. Prefixes VA1 and VE1 are used for Nova Scotia; VA2 & VE2 for Quebec; VA3 & VE3 for Ontario; VA4 & VE4 for Manitoba; VA5 & VE5 for Saskatchewan; VA6 & VE6 for Alberta; VA7 & VE7 for British Columbia; VE8 for the Northwest Territories; VE9 for New Brunswick; VY0 for Nunavut; VY1 for the Yukon; VY2 for Prince Edward Island; VO1 for Newfoundland; and VO2 for Labrador. CY is for amateurs operating from Sable Island (CY0) or St. Paul Island (CY9). Special permission is required to visit either of these: from Parks Canada for Sable and Coast Guard for St. Paul. The last two or three letters of the call signs are typically the operator's choice (upon completing the licensing test, the ham writes three most-preferred options). Two-letter call sign suffixes require a ham to have already been licensed for 5 years. Call signs in Canada can be requested with a fee.

Also, for smaller geopolitical entities, the digit at the second or third character might be part of the country identification. For example, VP2xxx is in the British West Indies, which is subdivided into VP2Exx Anguilla, VP2Mxx Montserrat, and VP2Vxx British Virgin Islands. VP5xxx is in the Turks and Caicos Islands, VP6xxx is on Pitcairn Island, VP8xxx is in the Falklands, and VP9xxx is in Bermuda.

Online callbooks or call sign databases can be browsed or searched to find out who holds a specific call sign. An example of an online callbook is QRZ.com. Various partial lists of famous people who hold or held amateur radio call signs have been compiled and published.

Many jurisdictions (but not in the U.K. nor Europe) may issue specialty vehicle registration plates to licensed amateur radio operators. The fees for application and renewal are usually less than the standard rate for specialty plates.

=== Privileges ===
The international symbol for amateur radio, which is included in the logos of many IARU member societies. The diamond holds a circuit diagram featuring components common to every radio: an antenna, inductor and ground.

In most administrations, unlike other RF spectrum users, radio amateurs may build or modify transmitting equipment for their own use within the amateur spectrum without the need to obtain government certification of the equipment. (Note: Hong Kong OFTA description of "radio amateur" privileges: Radio amateurs are free to choose any radio equipment designed for the amateur service. Radio amateurs may also design and build their own equipment provided that the requirements and limitations specified in the Amateur Station Licence and Schedules thereto are complied with.) (Note: FCC expectations of "radio amateurs": They design, construct, modify, and repair their [own] stations. The FCC equipment authorization program does not generally apply to amateur station transmitters.) Licensed amateurs can also use any frequency in their bands (rather than being allocated fixed frequencies or channels) and can operate medium-to-high-powered equipment on a wide range of frequencies so long as they meet certain technical parameters including occupied bandwidth, power, and prevention of spurious emission.

Radio amateurs have access to frequency allocations throughout the RF spectrum, usually allowing choice of an effective frequency for communications across a local, regional, or worldwide path. The shortwave bands, or HF, are suitable for worldwide communication, and the VHF and UHF bands normally provide local or regional communication, while the microwave bands have enough space, or bandwidth, for amateur television transmissions and high-speed computer networks.

In most countries, an amateur radio license grants permission to the license holder to own, modify, and operate equipment that is not certified by a governmental regulatory agency. This encourages amateur radio operators to experiment with home-constructed or modified equipment. The use of such equipment must still satisfy national and international standards on spurious emissions.

Amateur radio operators are encouraged both by regulations and tradition of respectful use of the spectrum to use as little power as possible to accomplish the communication. This is to minimise interference or electromagnetic compatibility (EMC) to any other device. Although allowable power levels are moderate by commercial standards, they are sufficient to enable global communication. Lower license classes usually have lower power limits; for example, the lowest license class in the UK (Foundation licence) has a limit of 25 W.

Power limits vary from country to country and between license classes within a country. For example, the peak envelope power limits for the highest available license classes in a few selected countries are: 2.25 kW in Canada; 1.5 kW in the United States; 1.0 kW in Belgium, Luxembourg, Switzerland, South Africa, the United Kingdom, and New Zealand; 750 W in Germany; 500 W in Italy; 400 W in Australia and India; and 150 W in Oman.

Output power limits may also depend on the mode of transmission. In Australia, for example, 400 W may be used for SSB transmissions, but FM and other modes are limited to 120 W.

The point at which power output is measured may also affect transmissions: The United Kingdom measures at the point the antenna is connected to the signal feed cable, which means the radio system may transmit more than 400 W to overcome signal loss in the cable; conversely, the U.S. and Germany measure power at the output of the final amplification stage, which results in a loss in radiated power with longer cable feeds.

Certain countries permit amateur radio licence holders to hold a Notice of Variation that allows higher power to be used than normally allowed for certain specific purposes. E.g. in the UK some amateur radio licence holders are allowed to transmit using (33 dBw) 2.0 kW for experiments entailing using the moon as a passive radio reflector (known as Earth–Moon–Earth communication) (EME).

=== Band plans and frequency allocations ===
The International Telecommunication Union (ITU) governs the allocation of communications frequencies worldwide, with participation of each nation's communications regulation authority. National communications regulators have some liberty to restrict access to these band plan frequencies or to award additional allocations as long as radio services in other countries do not suffer interference. In some countries, specific emission types are restricted to certain parts of the radio spectrum, and in most other countries, International Amateur Radio Union (IARU) member societies adopt voluntary plans to ensure the most effective use of spectrum.

In a few cases, a national telecommunication agency may also allow hams to use frequencies outside of the internationally allocated amateur radio bands. In Trinidad and Tobago, hams are allowed to use a repeater which is located on 148.800 MHz. This repeater is used and maintained by the National Emergency Management Agency (NEMA), but may be used by radio amateurs in times of emergency or during normal times to test their capability and conduct emergency drills. This repeater can also be used by non-ham NEMA staff and REACT members. In Australia and New Zealand, ham operators are authorized to use one of the UHF TV channels. In the U.S., amateur radio operators providing essential communication needs in connection with the immediate safety of human life and immediate protection of property when normal communication systems are not available may use any frequency including those of other radio services such as police and fire and in cases of disaster in Alaska may use the statewide emergency frequency of 5.1675 MHz with restrictions upon emissions.

Similarly, amateurs in the United States may apply to be registered with the Military Auxiliary Radio System (MARS). Once approved and trained, these amateurs also operate on US government military frequencies to provide contingency communications and morale message traffic support to the military services.

Range	Band	ITU Region 1	ITU Region 2	ITU Region 3
LF	2200 m	135.7–137.8 kHz		
MF	630 m	472–479 kHz		
MF	160 m	1.810–1.850 MHz	1.800–2.000 MHz	
HF	80 / 75 m	3.500–3.800 MHz	3.500–4.000 MHz	3.500–3.900 MHz
HF	60 m	5.3515–5.3665 MHz		
HF	40 m	7.000–7.200 MHz	7.000–7.300 MHz	7.000–7.200 MHz
HF	30 m^{[t2]}	10.100–10.150 MHz		
HF	20 m	14.000–14.350 MHz		
HF	17 m^{[t2]}	18.068–18.168 MHz		
HF	15 m	21.000–21.450 MHz		
HF	12 m^{[t2]}	24.890–24.990 MHz		
HF	10 m	28.000–29.700 MHz		
VHF	8 m^{[t3]}	40.000–40.700 MHz	—N/a	
VHF	6 m	50.000–52.000 MHz (50.000–54.000 MHz)^{[t4]}	50.000–54.000 MHz	
VHF	5 m^{[t3]}	58.000–60.100 MHz	—N/a	
VHF	4 m^{[t3]}	70.000–70.500 MHz	—N/a	
VHF	2 m	144.000–146.000 MHz	144.000–148.000 MHz	
VHF	1.25 m	—N/a	220.000–225.000 MHz	—N/a
UHF	70 cm	430.000–440.000 MHz	430.000–440.000 MHz (420.000–450.000 MHz)^{[t4]}	
UHF	33 cm	—N/a	902.000–928.000 MHz	—N/a
UHF	23 cm	1.240–1.300 GHz		
UHF	13 cm	2.300–2.450 GHz		
SHF	9 cm	3.400–3.475 GHz^{[t4]}	3.300–3.500 GHz	
SHF	5 cm	5.650–5.850 GHz	5.650–5.925 GHz	5.650–5.850 GHz
SHF	3 cm	10.000–10.500 GHz		
SHF	1.2 cm	24.000–24.250 GHz		
EHF	6 mm	47.000–47.200 GHz		
EHF	4 mm^{[t4]}	75.500 GHz^{[t3]} – 81.500 GHz	76.000–81.500 GHz	
EHF	2.5 mm	122.250–123.000 GHz		
EHF	2 mm	134.000–141.000 GHz		
EHF	1 mm	241.000–250.000 GHz		
THF	Sub-mm	Some administrations have authorized spectrum for amateur use in this region; others have declined to regulate frequencies above 300 GHz.		
[t1]	All allocations are subject to variation by country. For simplicity, only common allocations found internationally are listed. See a band's article for specifics.			
[t2]	HF allocation created at the 1979 World Administrative Radio Conference. These are commonly called the "WARC bands".			
[t3]	This is not mentioned in the ITU's Table of Frequency Allocations, but many individual administrations have commonly adopted this allocation under "Article 4.4".			
[t4]	This includes a currently active footnote allocation mentioned in the ITU's Table of Frequency Allocations. These allocations may only apply to a group of countries.			
See also: Radio spectrum, Electromagnetic spectrum

== Modes of communication ==
Amateurs use a variety of voice, text, image, and data communication modes over radio. Generally new modes can be tested in the amateur radio service, although national regulations may require disclosure of a new mode to permit radio licensing authorities to monitor the transmissions. Encryption, for example, is not generally permitted in the amateur radio service except for the special purpose of satellite vehicle control uplinks. The following is a partial list of the modes of communication used, where the mode includes both modulation types and operating protocols.

=== Voice ===
- Amplitude modulation (AM)
- Amplitude modulation equivalent (AME)
- Double sideband, suppressed carrier (DSB-SC)
- Frequency modulation (FM)
- Independent sideband (ISB)
- Single sideband (SSB)
- Phase modulation (PM)

=== Image ===
- Amateur television (ATV), also known as fast scan television
- Radiofax
- Slow-scan television (SSTV)

=== Text and data ===
In former times, most amateur digital modes were transmitted by inserting audio into the microphone input of a radio and using an analog scheme, such as amplitude modulation (AM), frequency modulation (FM), or single-sideband modulation (SSB). Beginning in 2017, increased use of several digital modes, particularly FT8, became popular within the amateur radio community.

Text-modes

- Continuous wave (CW), usually used for Morse code
- Automatic link establishment (ALE)
- Amateur teleprinting over radio (AMTOR)
- PACTOR
- Radioteletype (RTTY)
- Hellschreiber, a.k.a. Feld-Hell or Hell

Digital modes

- CLOVER
- D-STAR
- Digital mobile radio(DMR)
- Fusion (Yaesu proprietary mode)
- G-TOR
- Discrete multi-tone modulation modes such as Multi Tone 63 (MT63)
- Multiple frequency-shift keying (MFSK) modes:
  - JS8Call
  - Olivia MFSK
  - WSJT software modes:
    - FSK441, JT6M, JT65, JT9, FT8, FT4
  - WSPR
- NXDN (Open public safety standard, used in amateur radio)
- Packet radio (AX.25)
  - Automatic Packet Reporting System (APRS)
- Phase-Shift Keying
  - 31-baud BPSK (binary phase shift keying) PSK31
  - 31-baud QPSK (quadrature phase shift keying) QPSK31
  - 63-baud BPSK (binary phase shift keying) PSK63
  - 63-baud QPSK (quadrature phase shift keying) QPSK63

=== Modes by activity ===
The following "modes" use no one specific modulation scheme but rather are classified by the activity of the communication.

- AllStarLink (AllStar / ASL)
- Earth-Moon-Earth (EME)
- EchoLink
- Internet Radio Linking Project (IRLP)
- Low transmit power (QRP)
- Satellite (OSCAR – orbiting satellite carrying amateur radio)

== See also ==
- 4-meter band (70–70.5 MHz)
- 2-meter band (144–148 MHz)
- 70-centimeter band (430–450 MHz)
- Amateur radio operating award
- Hamfest
- International Amateur Radio Union
- Isotron
- List of amateur radio magazines
- List of amateur radio organizations
- List of amateur radio software
- Maritime mobile amateur radio
- NEC-2 (antenna modeling)
- Parks On The Air
- Piracy in amateur and two-way radio
- Prosigns for Morse code
- Summits On The Air
- Worked All Continents
- Worked All Zones
