= List of amateur radio software =

This is a list of software for amateur radio.

== Software tools ==
Software	License	Operating Systems	Category
HAM Radio Control	GPL	Windows, Linux, Raspberry Pi, Android	5 languages, Management of radios, MesNET chat also on Android via your radio, multidecoder, APRS, Propagation, DX Cluster, rotators, and much more.
LY4A DX Reminder	Freeware (TOSRS)	Windows, MAC, Android, IOS	Free DX cluster alarm: enter a callsign, pick bands and modes, get alerted when it is spotted.
CommTrak	Freeware (TOSRS)	Windows, Linux, Raspberry Pi, Android	CommTrak is an Amateur Radio & Emergency Communications Logging, Mapping, and Reporting software developed by Tamatu Systems NZ.
CW Skimmer	Proprietary	Windows	morse code decoding
EchoLink	Freeware	Windows, iOS, Android	VoIP
IRLP	Proprietary	Linux	VoIP
Fldigi	GPL	Windows, macOS, Linux, Android, FreeBSD	Modem for RTTY, (B)PSK, CW, Feld Hell, MFSK, Oliva, and more.
Flrig			Rig control companion program
Flarq			Automatic Repeat reQuest companion program for Fldigi
GNU Radio	GPL	Windows, macOS, Linux	software-defined radio and signal processing
QCluster	Freeware	macOS	Fully featured DX cluster access software compatible with Apple Silicon and Intel Macs.
Robust-Chat	GPL	Windows, Python	www.Robust-Chat.com Feature rich Chat program using Link500 TNC, Teensy RPR TNC's
SDRangel	GPL	Windows, macOS, Linux	software-defined radio
SDR--	AGPL	Windows, macOS, Linux	modular software-defined radio receiver and decoder
SDR#	Freeware	Windows	software-defined radio receiver
SDR++	GPL	Windows, macOS, Linux, Android	software-defined radio receiver
Winlink Global Radio Email®	Winlink Software License	Windows	email client using multiple protocols: IEEE 802.11 wifi, ALE, APRS, AX.25, D-Star, PACTOR, PACTOR-II, PACTOR-III, PACTOR-IV, WINMOR(Deprecated), ARDOP (Amateur Radio Digital Open Protocol), Vara HF, Vara FM, TCP/IP
WSJT	GPL	Windows, Unix, Unix-like	weak signal communication, modem for FT-8, FT-4, JT-65, and WSPR
WSJT-Z	GNU GPLv3	Windows	Weak signal communication, Fork of WSJT. Splash Screen says, "Your favorite hostile fork of WSJT"
WSPR	GPL	Windows, macOS, Linux, FreeBSD, Unix-like	weak signal communication
HamSphere	Proprietary	Windows, macOS, Linux, iOS, Android	VoIP, simulation
SPLAT!	GPL	Windows, macOS, Linux	radio propagation modeling
HamTools	GPL	Windows	eQSL creator, Adif Extender, QRZ lookup
Pat	MIT	Linux, Windows, Mac	Winlink packet tool
RepeaterSTART	GPL	Windows, Linux, Android	Ham radio repeater finder
Repeaterbook	Proprietary	ios, Android	Ham radio repeater finder
RFINDER	Proprietary	ios, Android	Ham radio repeater finder
CWGet	Proprietary	Windows, Windows Mobile	Morse code decoding
MMSSTV	LGPL	Windows	Slow-scan television encoding and decoding
QSSTV	GPL	Linux (maybe others)	Slow-scan television encoding and decoding
Orbitron			Satellite tracking and rotor control
Gridtracker			GridTracker is not a logging program. Instead it displays your QSO log data from WSJT-X plus any combination of adif formatted files you have stored on your computer, your network, or the internet.
Pycom Radio Controller	Freeware	Windows, macOS	Remote control for the Icom 9700/7610 and 7300MK2 tranceivers with first class satellite support

== Logging software ==
Software	License	Operating Systems	Features
CommTrak	Freeware (TOSRS)	Windows, Linux, Raspberry Pi, Android	CommTrak is an Amateur Radio & Emergency Communications Logging, Mapping, and Reporting software developed by Tamatu Systems NZ.
Amateur Contact Log by N3FJP	Proprietary	Windows	Logging, Networking, Real-time stats, Anti-duplication, Tailored, World map, Band conditions, Well-supported, Transceiver control, Callbook lookup, QSL handling (Hardcopy / LoTW / eQSL / Club Log), Awards, DX Spots, Digital Modes
DXLab by AA6YQ	Freeware	Windows	Logging, Transceiver control, Rotor control, Callbook lookup, QSL handling (Hardcopy / LoTW / eQSL / Club Log), Awards, DX Spots, Digital modes
Emacs QSO Logger	Open-Source (GPL-3.0)	Linux, MacOS and Windows	QSO logger for Emacs with a customizable dynamic form for rapid data entry into an ADIF file. Suitable for general logging or contesting, it can be customized to use almost any combination of fields in the ADIF specification. Syncs with radio via Hamlib.
Ham Radio Deluxe	Proprietary	Windows	Logging, Transceiver control, Rotor control, Callbook lookup, QSL handling (Hardcopy / LoTW / eQSL / Club Log), Awards, DX Spots, Digital modes, Satellite Tracking
HAMRS	Proprietary	Windows, Android, iOS, macOS, Ubuntu, Raspbian	HAMRS is a simple amateur radio contact logger, with templates tailored to portable activities like Parks on the Air, Field Day, etc.
MacLoggerDX	Proprietary	macOS	MacLoggerDX is a full-featured amateur radio contact logger for macOS with Transceiver control, Rotor control, Callbook lookup, QSL handling (Hardcopy / LoTW / eQSL / Club Log), DX Cluster and spotting, and basic contesting support. It also works with WSJT-X to control the transceiver while making digital contacts, etc.
HamLogBook by K6REA	Proprietary, Paid	Windows	HamLogBook is a simple logger, with a Windows 95-inspired user interface. It supports common ADIF fields, can look up callsigns on QRZ, exports ADIF 2.0 and can automatically upload to eqsl.net.
log4om	Freeware	Windows	
klog	Open-Source (GPL-3.0)	Linux, MacOS and Windows	
QLog	Open-Source (GPL-3.0)	Linux, MacOS and Windows	
QSO Director	Proprietary	Windows, MacOS and Linux	QSO Director is a modern amateur radio logging and operations suite software package. Designed for everyday QSOs, contesting, activations and DX operation. It provides fast logging, a large array of features and integration with tools such as WSJT, ClubLog and QRZ.COM. With a modern highly flexible user interface, it is cross platform supporting windows, Linux and MacOS.
QSOMate	Proprietary, Paid	iOS, MacOS	QSOMate is a logger for the Apple ecosystem, focusing on simple logging and integrations. Currently has integrations with Straight Key Century Club (SKCC), HamDB, Parks on the Air, and Summits on the Air.
Xlog	Open-Source (GPL-3.0)	Linux	Xlog is an easy-to-use program for logging your ham radio contacts. Contacts are saved in a browsable list which can be edited.
World Radio League	Free with paid upgrades	Cloud, iOS, Android	World Radio League offers contact logging seamlessly across Web, Android, and iOS. Supports POTA, SOTA, contests and integrates with WSJT and other clients.
Winlog32	Freeware	Windows	Amateur Radio Logging software designed and working on all Microsoft Windows platforms,This software has been in development for many years and the author (G0CUZ) provides this software FREE to use by all Radio Amateurs and SWL's in true 'Ham Spirit',
Picondo	Free, Optional Membership	Linux, Windows	The Picondo logger emphasises the quality of user experience, aiming for capabilities delivered in a simple, intuitive and effective form.

== Operating systems ==
The Debian project maintains a pure blend that includes ham radio software. The HamBSD project is a variation of OpenBSD.

== See also ==
- Amateur radio station § Computer-control software
- List of amateur radio modes
- Software-defined radio
