= Waverley Amateur Radio Society =

Amateur radio society in Sydney, Australia

- Abbreviation: WARS
- Formation: 1919
- Type: Association
- Legal status: Active
- Purpose: Advocacy, Education, Social Group
- Headquarters: Rose Bay RSL Club, Vickery Avenue, Rose Bay, NSW 2029.
- Location: QF56pd
- Region served: Sydney, Australia
- Affiliations: Wireless Institute of Australia
- Website: http://www.vk2bv.org/
- Remarks: The society operates under the call sign VK2BV
- Formerly called: Waverley Radio Club

The Waverley Amateur Radio Society (WARS) is an amateur radio society based in Rose Bay, a suburb of Sydney, New South Wales, Australia which operates under the call sign VK2BV. The society was founded in 1919 and is the oldest continuously licensed amateur radio club in Australia.

== History ==
The Waverley Radio Club was founded on 27 January 1919 by a group of 17 radio experimenters and enthusiasts living in the Waverley area and allocated license number N249 by the navy department. In 1922, when the Postmaster-General's Department took over licensing, the club call letters (as they were then known) were changed to 2BV and in 1929 national prefixes were adopted so becoming the call sign VK2BV.

Within a year of foundation, the club obtained its first licence for a one valve receiver and spark-gap transmitter on a wavelength of 200 meters.

Meetings until 1954 were held on Thursday evenings at the home of the club's first vice president, Mr Frank Geddes, at "Almont", 13 McPherson Street, Waverley. This was also the location of the club station.

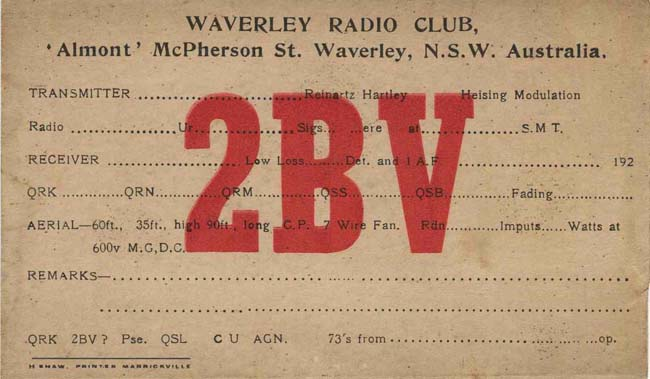
Waverley Amateur Radio Society QSL Card 1925

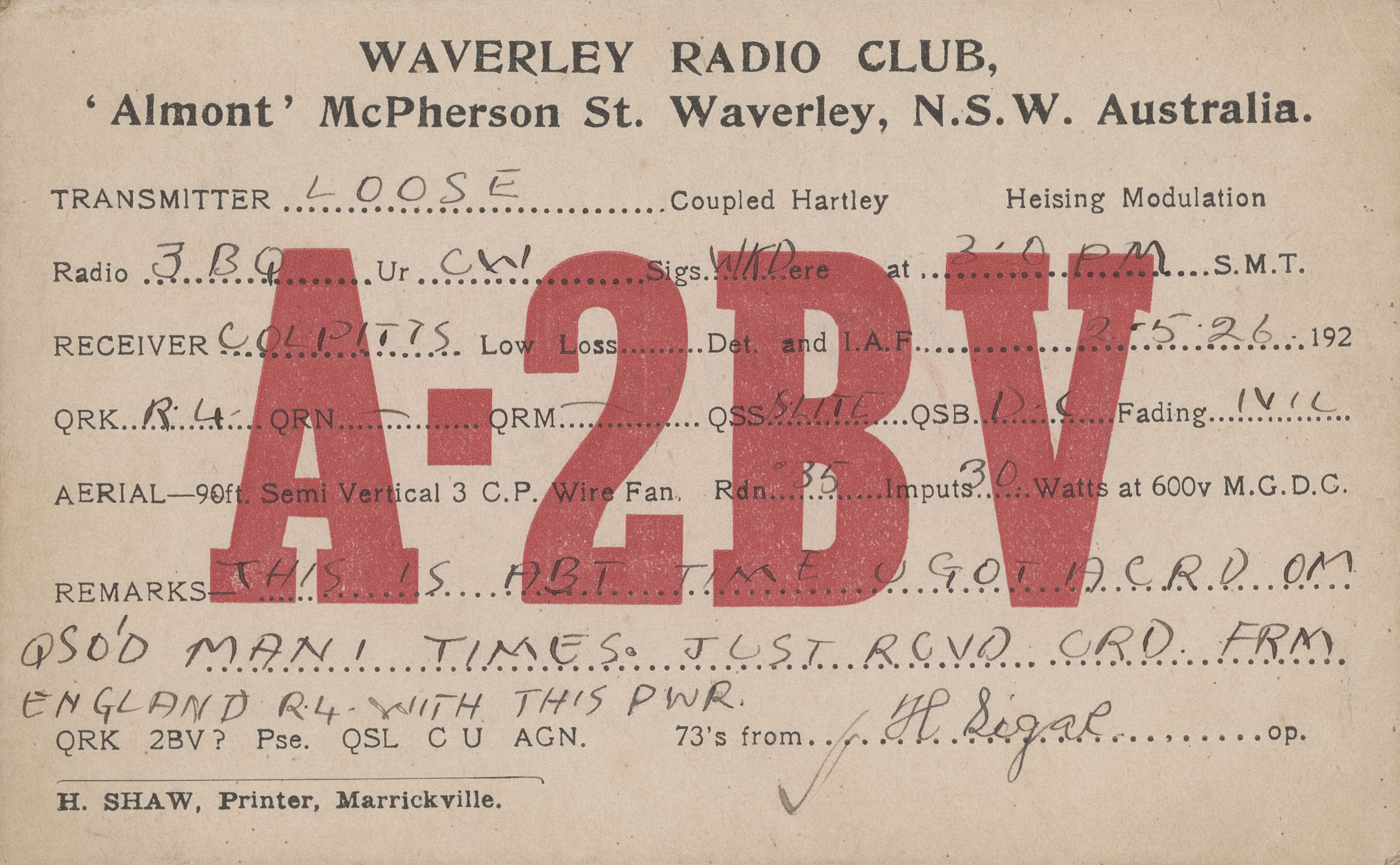
QSL card from A2BV Waverley Radio Club to VK3BQ Max Howden 1926

In the mid-1970s, the club changed its name to the Waverley Amateur Radio Society.

The club became affiliated to the Wireless Institute of Australia in 1926 and has been so ever since.

== Club Services ==
=== Repeaters ===
The club owns and operates two amateur radio repeaters from a location in Paddington operating under the call sign VK2ROT. On the 2-metre band the repeater operates on 147.025 MHz FM output / 147.625 MHz input using a 91.5 Hz CTCSS tone while on 70 cm the repeater is assigned to 438.575 MHz FM output / 433.575 MHz input using a 91.5 Hz CTCSS tone. The 70 cm repeater works with analogue transmissions and has access to Echolink and ALLSTAR.

=== D-Star & Yaesu Fusion ===
The club runs a 70 cm D-STAR repeater located at Governor Phillip Tower under the callsign VK2RBV. It operates on 438.775 MHz, offset -5 MHz, bandwidth 6.25 kHz and has coverage throughout the Sydney region.

The repeater stack consists of an ICOM ID-RP4000V 70 cm RF unit, an ICOM ID-RP2C repeater controller and Freestar control software running on a Beagleboard platform.

Another repeater is the Yaesu Fusion repeater co-located next to the D-star repeater. This operates on 438.1125, 5.4 MHz negative offset, with 91.5 CTCSS. It also support Yaesu Fusion and Wires-X in Auto-Auto mode. The repeater will follow the mode it receives.

=== Echolink ===
The club operates Echolink node 725953 linked to the 70 cm repeater.

=== IRLP ===
The club operated IRLP node 6250 through the 70 cm repeater but is now offline due to software incompatibilty rules.

=== P25 ===
The club operated P25 digital mode (NAC 293) through the 70 cm repeater but the Motorola Quantar has failed, so this function is offline.

=== APRS ===
The club operated an APRS iGate from the Rose Bay club house, call sign VK2BV-3, which serviced APRS traffic across the whole central Sydney region. However, having exited the Scout Hall, this node is offline.

== Club meetings ==
Society meetings are held at the clubhouse in the Rose Bay RSL Club in Vickery Avenue on the third Wednesday of every month from 7.30 p.m and project days on the first Saturday of the month from 1:30 p.m. The Club radio net operates every Monday at 8:00pm on the VK2RBV repeater in Governor Phillip Tower

(438.1125 -5.4Mhz offset, 91.5 Hz tone).[3]

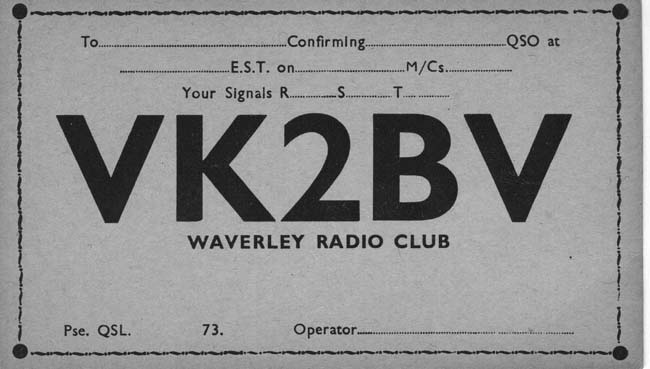
Waverley Amateur Radio Society QSL Card 1929

== Contests ==
The club organises the annual Sydney Amateur Radio Ferry Contest in March. This is a VHF / UHF contest which encourages participants to make contacts from Sydney Ferries or any of the 36 wharves around Sydney Harbour. Operation is open to any mode, either simplex or through repeater, using hand-held transceivers.

== Training and licensing ==
The club provides training and assessment services to the amateur radio community on behalf of the Australian Maritime College and holds sessions on a quarterly basis.

The Waverley club has partnered with Amateur Radio NSW to hold Foundation Licence Courses and Assessments (for all levels) at the Dural facilities.

== 90th Anniversary ==
In 2009, the club celebrated its 90th anniversary and the ACMA allocated the club a special event call sign, VI2BV90, for use over the period from 24 January to 1 February 2009.
