= M17 (amateur radio) =

Open source amateur radio mode

M17 is a digital voice and data protocol specification developed by Wojciech Kaczmarski (amateur radio call sign SP5WWP) with contributions from the amateur radio community. M17 is primarily designed for voice communications on the VHF amateur radio bands, and above. The project received grants from the Amateur Radio Digital Communications in 2021 and 2022. The protocol has been integrated into several hardware and software projects, including commercial handheld radios.

== Technical characteristics ==
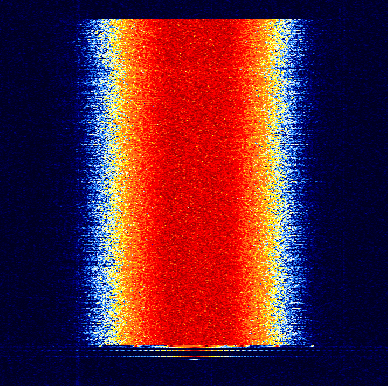
Spectrogram of the M17 protocol transmission. Time is on vertical axis, advancing from bottom to top. There's a 40-millisecond preamble visible at the beginning of the transmission.

M17 uses 4-level frequency-shift keying (4FSK) at 4,800 symbols per second, corresponding to a gross bit rate of 9,600 bits per second. The transmitted symbols are shaped using a root-raised-cosine filter. The nominal radio channel bandwidth is 9 kHz, with a minimum channel spacing of 12.5 kHz.

The specification also defines optional carrier-sense multiple access (CSMA) for reducing collisions when multiple stations share a radio frequency.

Each M17 frame consists of a 16-bit synchronization burst followed by a 368-bit payload, giving a total frame length of 384 bits (192 symbols). At 4,800 symbols per second, each frame lasts 40 milliseconds. In Stream mode, groups of six consecutive frames form a superframe, collectively carrying the link setup information needed by receivers joining an ongoing transmission.

Experimental M17 transmissions have been demonstrated via the EchoStar XXI and QO-100 geostationary satellites. M17 was also tested using the OPS-SAT experimental satellite platform.

== Voice encoding ==
M17 uses Codec 2, a low-bitrate open-source speech codec developed by David Rowe (VK5DGR) and contributors. Codec 2 was selected because of its open licensing and suitability for low-bitrate digital voice applications. It uses model-based sinusoidal speech coding. In its higher-bitrate modes, spectral magnitudes are represented using linear predictive coding (LPC) and line spectral pairs. M17 supports Codec 2 at 3,200 bits per second for voice-only transmission and 1,600 bits per second for voice-and-data transmission.

== Error control ==
M17 uses different forward error correction techniques depending on frame type. In Stream mode, the Link Information Channel (LICH) is encoded using the extended Golay (24,12) code. Stream contents are protected using a rate-1/2 convolutional code with puncturing, followed by bit interleaving. A 16-bit cyclic redundancy check (CRC) is included in Link Setup Frames and Packet Mode data for error detection.

== Application functions ==
The M17 data-link layer defines three modes of operation:

- Stream mode for continuous voice or data transmission.
  - Voice-only operation uses Codec 2 at 3,200 bits per second.
  - Voice-and-data operation uses Codec 2 at 1,600 bits per second alongside a 1,600-bit/s data channel.
  - Data-only streams are also supported.
- Packet mode for discrete data transfers of up to 823 bytes of application data per transmission. The specification defines packet protocol identifiers for RAW data, AX.25, APRS, 6LoWPAN, IPv4, SMS, and Winlink. Packet mode achieves a base throughput of 5 kbit/s, with net throughput exceeding 4.5 kbit/s for large payloads.
- Bit Error Rate Test (BERT) mode, which uses a pseudorandom bit sequence (PRBS9) to provide a standardized method for testing and comparing radio equipment and software implementations.

M17 uses 48-bit source and destination address fields. A 40-character alphabet allows up to nine characters to be encoded in each field. These usually represent amateur radio callsigns, although other identifiers can also be used, particularly for destination addresses such as reflector names and commands.

When encryption is not used, the 112-bit META field can carry text data, GNSS position information and extended callsign data. In Stream mode, this information is conveyed through the Link Information Channel (LICH) and can be updated at six-frame superframe boundaries.

Network operation is supported through reflectors and IP links, allowing repeaters and private access points (hotspots) to interconnect and route voice calls and data streams between distant stations.

=== Security features ===
- Scrambling: An optional XOR-based scrambling method using a pseudorandom binary sequence generated by a linear-feedback shift register (LFSR). The specification defines 8-, 16- and 24-bit LFSRs, with sequence periods of 255, 65,535 and 16,777,215 bits, respectively.
- AES encryption: A symmetric block cipher using AES in counter mode (AES-CTR). Key lengths of 128, 192 and 256 bits are supported. A 112-bit nonce and a 16-bit frame counter form the counter block. The specification warns that AES-CTR does not provide message authentication on its own.
- Digital signature authentication using ECDSA: M17 defines stream authentication using the secp256r1 elliptic curve. A stream digest is signed using the sender's private key. The resulting 512-bit signature is transmitted in four additional frames at the end of the transmission and can be verified by receivers using the sender's public key.

== Hardware support ==
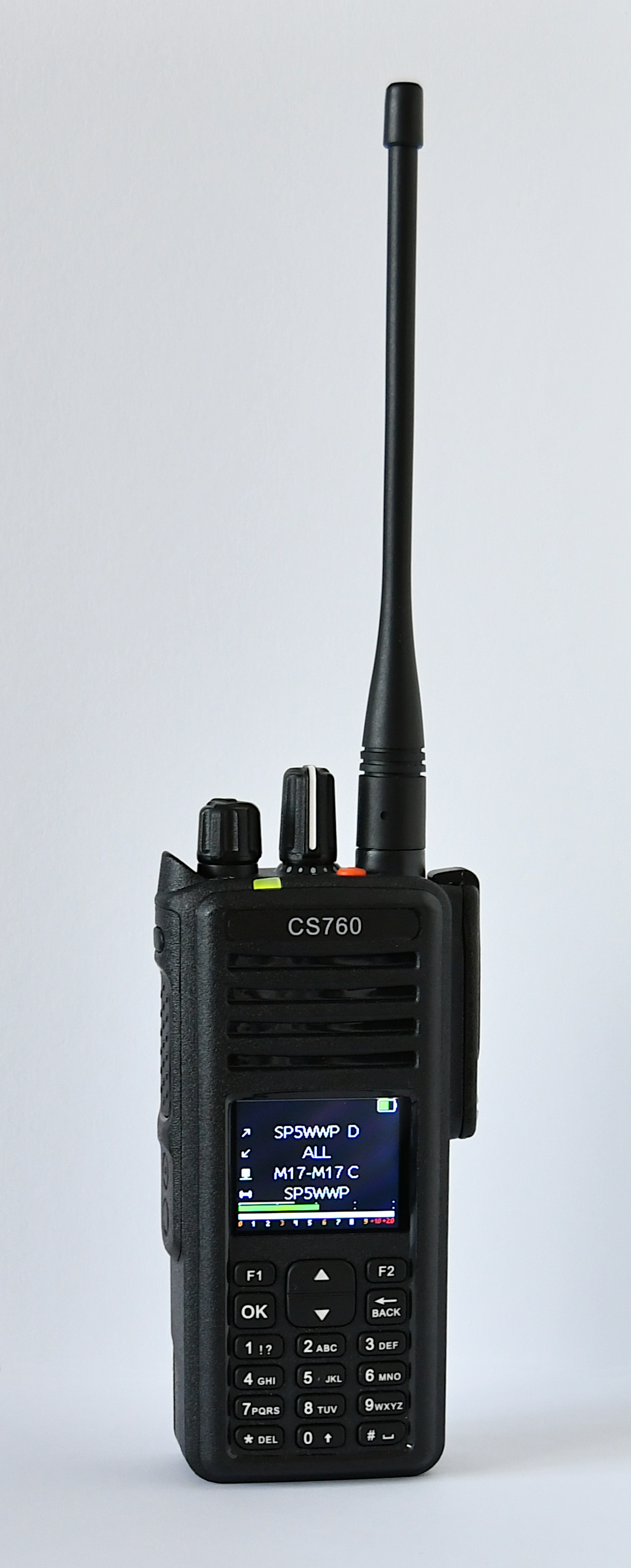
Prototype of the CS7000 M17 handheld radio (CS760), running OpenRTX open-source firmware

With a small hardware modification, TYT MD-380, MD-390 and MD-UV380 handheld transceivers can be flashed with custom, free, open source firmware to enable M17 support.

In July 2024, a US-based company Connect Systems, Inc. released the CS7000-M17, being the first commercial off-the-shelf handheld transceiver with native M17 support.

== Bridging with other modes ==
Links between M17 and other digital voice modes and Internet linked networks exist, with several networks providing M17 access. Modes bridged include DMR, P25, System Fusion, D-STAR, NXDN, AllStarLink, EchoLink and IRLP.

== Comparison with other standards ==
	M17	Digital Mobile Radio (DMR)	D-STAR	System Fusion (YSF)
Specification type	Open	Open	Partially open	Closed (proprietary)
Developer	Amateur radio community (decentralized)	European Telecommunications Standards Institute (ETSI)	Japan Amateur Radio League (JARL), ICOM Inc., Kenwood Corporation, and others	Yaesu
Modulation	4FSK	4FSK	GMSK	4FSK
Channel (medium) access	FDMA, optional CSMA	FDMA (Tier I), 2-slot TDMA (Tier II/III)	FDMA	FDMA
Voice codec	Codec 2 (open-source)	AMBE+2 (proprietary)	AMBE (proprietary)	AMBE+2 (proprietary)
Arbitrary data transfer support	Full	Limited (text messaging, geolocation)	Limited (text messaging, geolocation, images)	Limited (text messaging, geolocation, images)
Extensibility	Full, through specification extensions	Fixed, defined by the specification	Fixed, defined by the specification	Fixed, defined by the specification

== M17 over IP ==
Access nodes and repeaters can be linked using reflectors. Over 160 M17 reflectors exist worldwide (November 2026).

== Governance and licensing ==
The M17 Protocol Specification document is licensed under the GNU Free Documentation License, version 1.3 or later. Software included in the specification is licensed under the GNU General Public License, version 2 or later. Development of the specification is coordinated publicly through the M17 Project's GitHub repositories.

== History ==
The project was started in 2019 by Wojciech Kaczmarski in Warsaw, Poland. A local amateur radio club he was a member of, was involved in digital voice communications. Kaczmarski, having experimented with TETRA and DMR, decided to create a completely non-proprietary protocol and named it after the club's street address - Mokotowska 17. As every part of the protocol was intended to be open source, Codec 2, released under the GNU LGPL 2.1 license, was chosen as the speech encoder.

== Applications and projects with M17 support ==
- OpenRTX - free and open-source firmware for ham radios
- DroidStar - digital voice client for Android
- SDR++ - multiplatform, open-source software defined radio receiver
- SDRangel - multiplatform, open-source software defined radio receiver/transmitter
- OpenWebRX - web-based software defined radio receiver
- mrefd - M17 reflector
- rpitx - general radio frequency transmitter for Raspberry Pi
- dsd-fme - digital speech decoder
- mvoice - voice client and graphical repeater application (Raspberry and Linux)
- mspot - hotspot software

== See also ==
- NXDN
- D-STAR
- Speech coding
- Quadratic permutation polynomials (QPP)

== Related links ==
- M17 Project's website
- M17 Project on GitHub
- Twitter feed
- Robert Riggs' (WX9O) M17 baseband encoder/decoder library (C++, GPL)
- OpenWebRX - web based SDR by Jakob Ketterl (DD5JFK), includes M17 decoder
- SDR++ - free, open source SDR software with M17 support
- mvoice - an open source program to connect to M17 reflectors
- Article on the M17 Project in the Radio Society of Great Britain's RadCom magazine
