= Amateur radio repeater =

Combined receiver and transmitter

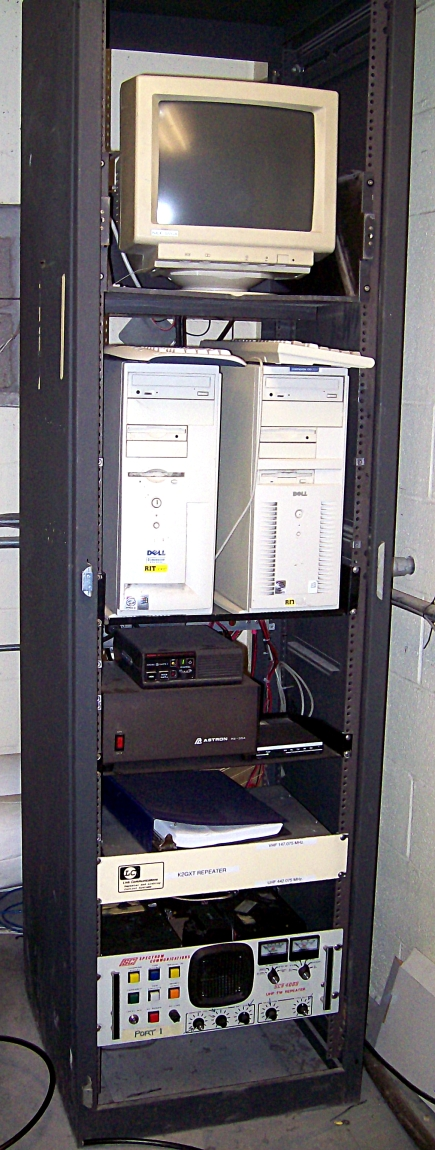
An amateur radio repeater system consisting of a 70 cm repeater and a 2-meter digipeater and iGate.

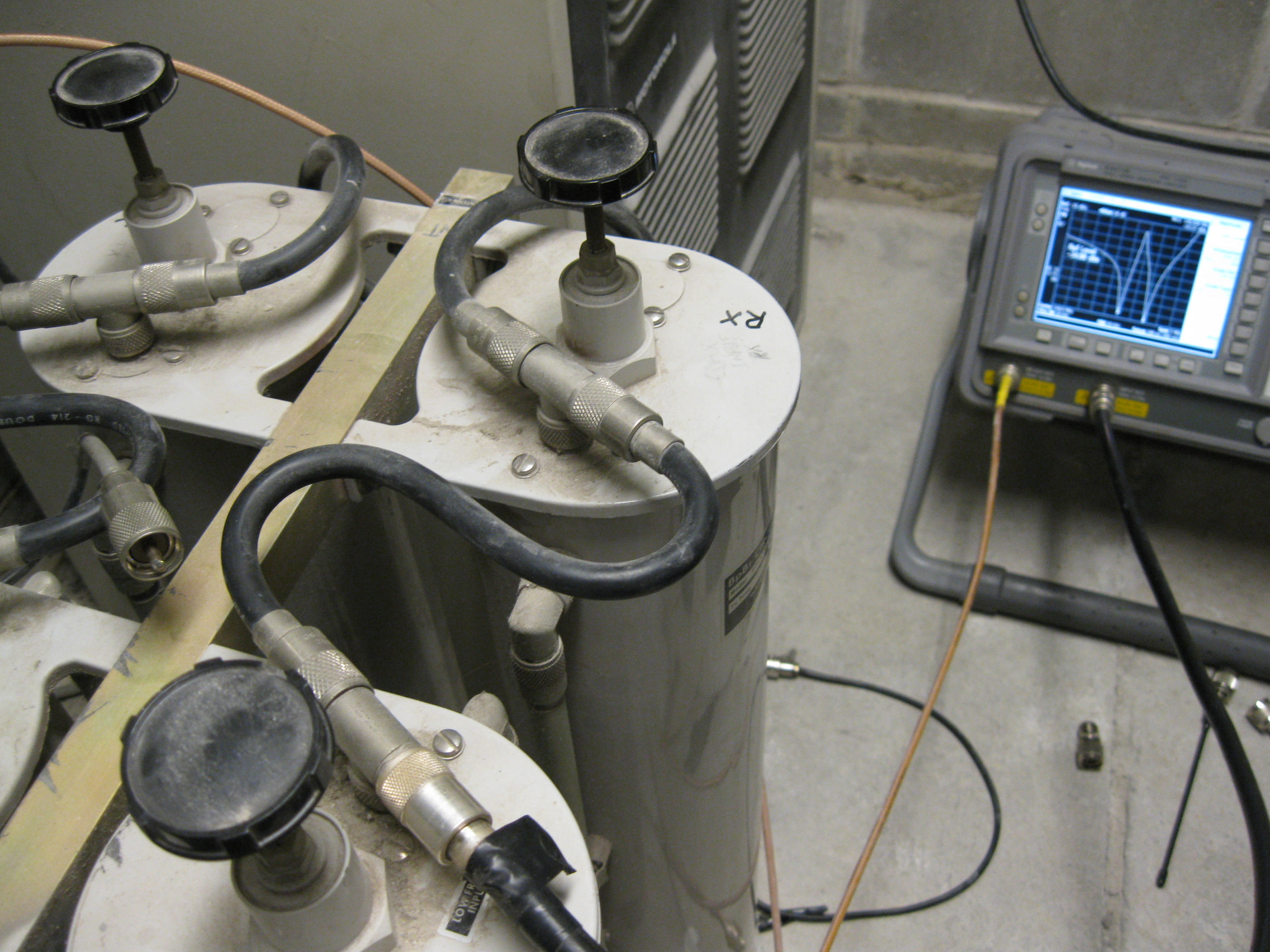
Coaxial cavity RF filter at 2 meter repeater

An amateur radio repeater is an electronic device that receives a weak or low-level amateur radio signal and retransmits it at a higher level or higher power, so that the signal can cover longer distances without degradation. Many repeaters are located on hilltops or on tall buildings as the higher location increases their coverage area, sometimes referred to as the radio horizon, or "footprint". Amateur radio repeaters are similar in concept to those used by public safety entities (police, fire department, etc.), businesses, government, military, and more. Amateur radio repeaters may even use commercially packaged repeater systems that have been adjusted to operate within amateur radio frequency bands, but more often amateur repeaters are assembled from receivers, transmitters, controllers, power supplies, antennas, and other components, from various sources.

== Introduction ==
In amateur radio, repeaters are typically maintained by individual hobbyists or local groups of amateur radio operators. Many repeaters are provided openly to other amateur radio operators and typically not used as a remote base station by a single user or group. In some areas multiple repeaters are linked together to form a wide-coverage network, such as the linked system provided by the Independent Repeater Association which covers most of western Michigan, or the Western Intertie Network System ("WINsystem") that now covers a great deal of California, and is in 17 other states, including Hawaii, along with parts of four other countries, Australia, Canada, Great Britain and Japan.

=== Frequencies ===
Repeaters are found mainly in the VHF 6-meter (50–54 MHz), 2-meter (144–148 MHz), 1.25-meter band (1 1/4 meters) (220–225 MHz) and the UHF 70 centimeter (420–450 MHz) bands, but can be used on almost any frequency pair above 28 MHz. In some areas, 33 centimeters (902–928 MHz) and 23 centimeters (1.24–1.3 GHz) are also used for repeaters. Note that different countries have different rules; for example, in the United States, the two-meter band is 144–148 MHz, while in the United Kingdom (and most of Europe) it is 144–146 MHz.

Repeater frequency sets are known as "repeater pairs", and in the amateur radio community most follow ad hoc standards for the difference between the two frequencies, commonly called the offset. In the USA two-meter band, the standard offset is 600 kHz (0.6 MHz), but sometimes unusual offsets, referred to as oddball splits, are used. The actual frequency pair used is assigned by a local frequency coordinating council.

In the days of crystal-controlled radios, these pairs were identified by the last portion of the transmit (Input) frequency followed by the last portion of the receive (Output) frequency that the ham would put into the radio. Thus "three-four nine-four" (34/94) meant that radio amateurs would transmit on 146.34 MHz and listen on 146.94 MHz (while the repeater would do the opposite, listening on 146.34 and transmitting on 146.94). In areas with many repeaters, "reverse splits" were common (i.e., 94/34), to prevent interference between systems.

Since the late 1970s, the use of synthesized, microprocessor-controlled radios, and widespread adoption of standard frequency splits have changed the way repeater pairs are described. In 1980, a radio amateur might have been told that a repeater was on "22/82"—today they will most often be told "682 down". The 6 refers to the last digit of 146 MHz, so that the display will read "146.82" (the output frequency), and the radio is set to transmit "down" 600 kHz on 146.22 MHz. Another way of describing a repeater frequency pair is to give the repeater's output frequency, along with the direction of offset ("+" or "plus" for an input frequency above the output frequency, "−" or "minus" for a lower frequency) with the assumption that the repeater uses the standard offset for the band in question. For instance, a 2-meter repeater might be described as "147.36 with a plus offset", meaning that the repeater transmits on 147.36 MHz and receives on 147.96 MHz, 600 kHz above the output frequency.

=== Services ===
Services provided by a repeater may include an autopatch connection to a POTS/PSTN telephone line to allow users to make telephone calls from their keypad-equipped radios. These advanced services may be limited to members of the group or club that maintains the repeater. Many amateur radio repeaters typically have a tone access control (CTCSS, also called CG or PL tone) implemented to prevent them from being keyed-up (operated) accidentally by interference from other radio signals. A few use a digital code system called DCS, DCG or DPL (the last is a Motorola trademark). In the UK most repeaters also respond to a short burst of 1750 Hz tone to open the repeater.

In many communities, a repeater has become a major on-the-air gathering spot for the local amateur radio community, especially during "drive time" (the morning or afternoon commuting time). In the evenings local public service nets may be heard on these systems and many repeaters are used by weather spotters. In an emergency or a disaster a repeater can sometimes help to provide needed communications between areas that could not otherwise communicate. Until cellular telephones became popular, it was common for community repeaters to have "drive time" monitoring stations so that mobile amateurs could call in traffic accidents via the repeater to the monitoring station who could relay it to the local police agencies via telephone. Systems with autopatches frequently had (and still have) most of the public safety agencies numbers programmed as speed-dial numbers.

=== US repeater coordination ===
Repeater coordination is not required by the Federal Communications Commission, nor does the FCC regulate, certify or otherwise regulate frequency coordination for the amateur radio bands.

Amateur radio repeater coordinators or coordination groups are all volunteers and have no legal authority to assume jurisdictional or regional control in any area where the Federal Communications Commission regulates the Amateur Radio Service. The United States Code of Federal Regulations Title 47 CFR, Part 97, which are the laws in which the Amateur Radio Service is regulated clearly states the definition of frequency coordinator.

The purpose of coordinating a repeater or frequency is to reduce harmful interference to other fixed operations. Coordinating a repeater or frequency with other fixed operations demonstrates good engineering and amateur practice.

=== UK repeaters ===
In the UK, the frequency allocations for repeaters are managed by the Emerging Technology Co-ordination Committee (ETCC) of the Radio Society of Great Britain and licensed by Ofcom, the industry regulator for communications in the UK. Each repeater has a NOV (Notice of Variation) licence issued to a particular amateur radio callsign (this person is normally known as the "repeater keeper") thus ensuring the licensing authority has a single point of contact for that particular repeater.

Each repeater in the UK is normally supported by a repeater group composed of local amateur radio enthusiasts who pay a nominal amount e.g. £10–15 a year each to support the maintenance of each repeater and to pay for site rents, electricity costs etc. Repeater groups do not receive any central funding from other organisations.

Such groups include the Central Scotland FM Group and the Scottish Borders Repeater Group.

== Repeater equipment ==
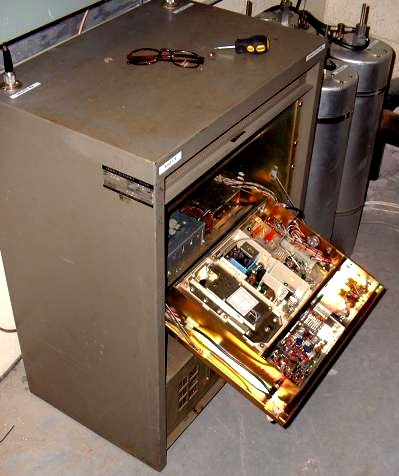
2-meter GE Mastr II repeater with the service panel lowered and receiver / exciter cover removed

The most basic repeater consists of an FM receiver on one frequency and an FM transmitter on another frequency usually in the same radio band, connected together so that when the receiver picks up a signal, the transmitter is keyed and rebroadcasts whatever is heard. Continuous Tone-Coded Squelch System, provides an electronic means of allowing a repeater to respond only to stations that encode or send a very precise audio tone at a very low level superimposed on the transmitter along with the microphone audio.

In order to run the repeater a repeater controller is necessary. A repeater controller can be a hardware solution or even be implemented in software.

Repeaters typically have a timer to cut off retransmission of a signal that goes too long. Repeaters operated by groups with an emphasis on emergency communications often limit each transmission to 30 seconds, while others may allow three minutes or even longer. The timer restarts after a short pause following each transmission, and many systems feature a beep or chirp tone to signal that the timeout timer has reset.

== Repeater types ==
=== Conventional repeaters ===
Conventional repeaters, also known as in-band or same-band repeaters, retransmit signals within the same frequency band, and they only repeat signals using a particular modulation scheme, usually FM.

Standard repeaters require either the use of two antennas (one each for transmitter and receiver) or a duplexer to isolate the transmit and receive signals over a single antenna. The duplexer is a device which prevents the repeater's high-power transmitter (on the output frequency) from drowning out the users' signal on the repeater receiver (on the input frequency). A diplexer allows two transmitters on different frequencies to use one antenna, and is common in installations where one repeater on 2 m and a second on 440 MHz share one feedline up the tower and one antenna.

Most repeaters are remotely controlled through the use of audio tones on a control channel.

=== Cross-band repeaters ===
A cross-band repeater (sometimes called replexer), is a repeater that retransmits a specific mode on a frequency in one band to a specific mode on a frequency in a different band. This technique allows for a smaller and simpler repeater system. Repeating signals across widely separated frequency bands allows for simple filters to be used to allow one antenna to be used for both transmit and receive at the same time. This avoids the use of complex duplexers to achieve the required rejection for same band repeating.

Most modern dual-band amateur transceivers are capable of cross-band repeater access. A smaller subset are capable of being used themselves as a crossband repeater.

=== Amateur television repeaters ===
Amateur television (ATV) repeaters are used by amateur radio operators to transmit full motion video. The bands used by ATV repeaters vary by country, but in the US a typical configuration is as a cross-band system with an input on the 33 or 23 cm band and output on 421.25 MHz or, sometimes, 426.25 MHz (within the 70 cm band). These output frequencies happen to be the same as standard cable television channels 57 and 58, meaning that anyone with a cable-ready analog NTSC TV can tune them in without special equipment.

There are also digital amateur TV repeaters that retransmit digital video signals. Frequently DVB-S modulation is used for digital ATV, due to narrow bandwidth needs and high loss tolerances. These DATV repeaters are more prevalent in Europe currently, partially because of the availability of DVB-S equipment.

=== Satellite repeaters ===
In addition, amateur radio satellites have been launched with the specific purpose of operating as space-borne amateur repeaters. The worldwide amateur satellite organization AMSAT designs and builds many of the amateur satellites, which are also known as OSCARs. Several satellites with amateur radio equipment on board have been designed and built by universities around the world. Also, several OSCARs have been built for experimentation. For example, NASA and AMSAT coordinated the release of SuitSat which was an attempt to make a low cost experimental satellite from a discarded Russian spacesuit outfitted with amateur radio equipment.

The repeaters on board a satellite may be of any type; the key distinction is that they are in orbit around the Earth, rather than terrestrial in nature. The three most common types of OSCARs are linear transponders, cross-band FM repeaters, and digipeaters (also referred to as pacsats).

=== Linear transponders ===
Amateur transponder repeaters are most commonly used on amateur satellites. A specified band of frequencies, usually having a bandwidth of 20 to 800 kHz is repeated from one band to another. Transponders are not mode specific and typically no demodulation occurs. Any signal with a bandwidth narrower than the transponder's pass-band will be repeated; however, for technical reasons, use of modes other than SSB and CW is discouraged. Transponders may be inverting or non-inverting. An example of an inverting transponder would be a 70cm to 2m transponder which receives on the 432.000 MHz to 432.100 MHz frequencies and transmits on the 146.000 MHz to 146.100 MHz frequencies by inverting the frequency range within the band. In this example, a signal received at 432.001 MHz would be transmitted on 146.099 MHz. Voice signals using upper sideband modulation on the input would result in a LSB modulation on the output, and vice versa."Phase 3D Satellite Primer".

=== Store-and-forward systems ===
Another class of repeaters do not simultaneously retransmit a signal, on different frequency, as they receive it. Instead, they operate in a store-and-forward manner, by receiving and then retransmitting on the same frequency after a short delay.

These systems may not be legally classified as "repeaters", depending on the definition set by a country's regulator. For example, in the US, the FCC defines a repeater as an "amateur station that simultaneously retransmits the transmission of another amateur station on a different channel or channels." (CFR 47 97.205(b)) Store-and-forward systems neither retransmit simultaneously, nor use a different channel. Thus, they must be operated under different rules than more conventional repeaters.

==== Simplex repeater ====
A type of system known as a simplex repeater uses a single transceiver and a short-duration voice recorder, which records whatever the receiver picks up for a set length of time (usually 30 seconds or less), then plays back the recording over the transmitter on the same frequency. A common name is a "parrot" repeater.

==== Digipeater ====
Another form of repeater used in amateur packet radio, a form of digital computer-to-computer communications, is dubbed "digipeater" (for DIGItal rePEATER). Digipeaters are often used for activities and modes such as packet radio, Automatic Packet Reporting System, and D-STAR's digital data mode. Also commercial digital modes such as DMR, P25 and NXDN. Some modes are full duplex and internet linked.

==== SSTV repeater ====
An SSTV repeater is an amateur radio repeater station that relays slow-scan television signals. A typical SSTV repeater is equipped with a HF or VHF transceiver and a computer with a sound card, which serves as a demodulator/modulator of SSTV signals.

SSTV repeaters are used by amateur radio operators for exchanging pictures. If two stations cannot copy each other, they can still communicate through a repeater.

One type of SSTV repeater is activated by a station sending it a 1,750 Hz tone. The repeater sends K in morse code to confirm its activation, after which the station must start sending a picture within about 10 seconds. After reception, the received image is transmitted on the repeater's operation frequency. Another type is activated by the SSTV vertical synchronization signal (VIS code).

Depending on the software it uses (MMSSTV, JVComm32, MSCAN, for example), an SSTV repeater typically operates in common SSTV modes.

== Repeater networks ==
Repeaters may be linked together in order to form what is known as a linked repeater system or linked repeater network. In such a system, when one repeater is keyed-up by receiving a signal, all the other repeaters in the network are also activated and will transmit the same signal. The connections between the repeaters are made via radio (usually on a different frequency from the published transmitting frequency) for maximum reliability. Some networks have a feature to allow the user being able to turn additional repeaters and links on or off on the network. This feature is typically done with DTMF tones to control the network infrastructure. Such a system allows coverage over a wide area, enabling communication between amateurs often hundreds of miles (several hundred km) apart. These systems are used for area or regional communications, for example in Skywarn nets, where storm spotters relay severe weather reports. All the user has to know is which channel to use in which area.

=== Voting systems ===
In order to get better receive coverage over a wide area, a similar linked setup can also be done with what is known as a voted receiver system. In a voted receiver, there are several satellite receivers set up to receive on the same frequency (the one that the users transmit on). All of the satellite receivers are linked to a voting selector panel that switches from receiver to receiver based on the best quieting (strongest) signal, and the output of the selector will actually trigger the central repeater transmitter. A properly adjusted voting system can switch many times a second and can actually "assemble" a multi-syllable word using a different satellite receiver for each syllable. Such a system can be used to widen coverage to low power mobile radios or handheld radios that otherwise would not be able to key up the central location, but can receive the signal from the central location without an issue. Voting systems require no knowledge or effort on the part of the user – the system just seems to have better-than-average handheld coverage.

=== Internet linking ===
Repeaters may also be connected over the Internet using voice over IP (VoIP) techniques. VoIP links are a convenient way to connecting distant repeaters that would otherwise be unreachable by VHF/UHF radio propagation. Popular VoIP amateur radio network protocols include AllStarLink/HamVoIP, D-STAR, Echolink, IRLP, WIRES and eQSO. Digital Mobile Radio (DMR), D-STAR, Fusion, P25 and NXDN all have a codec in the user radio and along with the encoded audio, also send and receive user number and destination information so one can talk to another specific user or a Talk Group. Two such worldwide networks are DMR-MARC and Brandmeister.

For example, a simplex gateway may be used to link a simplex repeater into a repeater network via the Internet.

== Operating terms ==
- Timing Out is the situation where a person talks too long and the repeater time-out timer (TOT) shuts off the repeater transmitter.
- Kerchunking is transmitting a momentary signal to check a repeater without properly identifying. In many countries, such an act violates amateur radio regulations. The term "Kerchunk" can also apply to the sound a large FM transmitter makes when the operator switches it off and on.

Range	Band	ITU Region 1	ITU Region 2	ITU Region 3
LF	2200 m	135.7–137.8 kHz		
MF	630 m	472–479 kHz		
MF	160 m	1.810–1.850 MHz	1.800–2.000 MHz	
HF	80 / 75 m	3.500–3.800 MHz	3.500–4.000 MHz	3.500–3.900 MHz
HF	60 m	5.3515–5.3665 MHz		
HF	40 m	7.000–7.200 MHz	7.000–7.300 MHz	7.000–7.200 MHz
HF	30 m^{[t2]}	10.100–10.150 MHz		
HF	20 m	14.000–14.350 MHz		
HF	17 m^{[t2]}	18.068–18.168 MHz		
HF	15 m	21.000–21.450 MHz		
HF	12 m^{[t2]}	24.890–24.990 MHz		
HF	10 m	28.000–29.700 MHz		
VHF	8 m^{[t3]}	40.000–40.700 MHz	—N/a	
VHF	6 m	50.000–52.000 MHz (50.000–54.000 MHz)^{[t4]}	50.000–54.000 MHz	
VHF	5 m^{[t3]}	58.000–60.100 MHz	—N/a	
VHF	4 m^{[t3]}	70.000–70.500 MHz	—N/a	
VHF	2 m	144.000–146.000 MHz	144.000–148.000 MHz	
VHF	1.25 m	—N/a	220.000–225.000 MHz	—N/a
UHF	70 cm	430.000–440.000 MHz	430.000–440.000 MHz (420.000–450.000 MHz)^{[t4]}	
UHF	33 cm	—N/a	902.000–928.000 MHz	—N/a
UHF	23 cm	1.240–1.300 GHz		
UHF	13 cm	2.300–2.450 GHz		
SHF	9 cm	3.400–3.475 GHz^{[t4]}	3.300–3.500 GHz	
SHF	5 cm	5.650–5.850 GHz	5.650–5.925 GHz	5.650–5.850 GHz
SHF	3 cm	10.000–10.500 GHz		
SHF	1.2 cm	24.000–24.250 GHz		
EHF	6 mm	47.000–47.200 GHz		
EHF	4 mm^{[t4]}	75.500 GHz^{[t3]} – 81.500 GHz	76.000–81.500 GHz	
EHF	2.5 mm	122.250–123.000 GHz		
EHF	2 mm	134.000–141.000 GHz		
EHF	1 mm	241.000–250.000 GHz		
THF	Sub-mm	Some administrations have authorized spectrum for amateur use in this region; others have declined to regulate frequencies above 300 GHz.		
[t1]	All allocations are subject to variation by country. For simplicity, only common allocations found internationally are listed. See a band's article for specifics.			
[t2]	HF allocation created at the 1979 World Administrative Radio Conference. These are commonly called the "WARC bands".			
[t3]	This is not mentioned in the ITU's Table of Frequency Allocations, but many individual administrations have commonly adopted this allocation under "Article 4.4".			
[t4]	This includes a currently active footnote allocation mentioned in the ITU's Table of Frequency Allocations. These allocations may only apply to a group of countries.			
See also: Radio spectrum, Electromagnetic spectrum
