= Parallel Logic Radio Interface =

Set of circuits of interest to radio amateurs

PLRI (Parallel Logic Radio Interface) is a set of circuits of interest to radio amateurs Amateur Radio (hams). These circuits are fully compatible with IRLP (Internet Radio Linking Project). IRLP is trademarked by Dave Cameron.

The circuit shown below is the Deluxe PLRI interface, and is used to connect a radio to a PC using a parallel port and sound card. This circuit is fully compatible with the Version 3 IRLP board, and can be used in place of an IRLP board. This circuit allows negative or positive COS from the radio, and also supports negative or positive PTT keying. This circuit can be home built for roughly $20 US.

This circuit can be used with several software packages, such as Asterisk, Allstar, app_rpt, IRLP, RtpDir, TheLinkBox, Echolink or as a repeater controller board under any of the supported Linux software packages.

== History ==
Development on the prototype interface began in 2008. All of the PLRI circuits are original designs by Kyle Yoksh, K0KN, and therefore not reverse-engineered from the IRLP board or elsewhere.

The PLRI circuit has had three major revisions so far.

Besides the interface shown here, there are also three other PLRI circuits.

One is a multi-radio version that supports up to 5 radios to be controlled by a single parallel port, and also supports serial operation. One is an adapter to allow use of an IRLP board to be controlled by a serial port, and the other provides the AUX 1,2,3 outputs not found on early IRLP boards.

All PLRI circuits can be found at http://www.qsl.net/k0kn/plri

== Construction ==
The PLRI circuits are designed to use discrete components and DIP socketed integrated circuits for several reasons. For one thing, these are commonly found in ham operator's "junk boxes". Also, discrete transistors are able to sink more current than the tiny surface-mount transistors. Special soldering iron and magnifying glass not required!

The PLRI interface consists of a hardware DTMF decoder, PTT circuit, COS circuit, and 3 auxiliary outputs for use with external circuits.

The DTMF decoder circuit uses a MT8870 integrated circuit and a HCF4081 AND-gate integrated circuit. The AND-gate is used to provide a pulsed output to the PC parallel port, rather than the latched output of the MT8870.

Auxiliary outputs 1,2,3 are built with NPN/PNP transistor pairs for several reasons. All outputs are capable of active high or active low switching. Active high switching allows for maximum switching current, as the NPN transistor is also used to light the corresponding LED and switch the PNP transistor.

The PLRI interface can be connected directly to the radio(s), or connected to a Rigblaster-type interface The latter method is preferred, as the PLRI interface contains no audio circuitry such as isolation transformers or bypass capacitors.

== Other ==
This project includes a set of electronic schematics of interest to radio amateurs (ham radio).

These circuits are compatible with the IRLP voice-over-IP (VOIP) system, and can be used for Echolink, IRLP, Asterisk and D-STAR systems using the RtpDir or TheLinkBox software packages. As of 2011, the App_rpt package for Linux (also known as Asterisk) supports the parallel port for COS/PTT, and thus supports the PLRI board.

The PRLI Deluxe Interface Circuit can be directly connected to the node radio(s), or connected to the node radio(s) via a standard Rigblaster-type radio interface.

== See also ==
- Asterisk (PBX)
- Echolink
- Internet Radio Linking Project
