= Wojciech Kaczmarski =

Polish engineer

Wojciech Kaczmarski is a Polish engineer known for initiating the M17 open digital voice project and for his work on open-source radio hardware and software.

== M17 protocol development ==
Kaczmarski initiated the development of M17, an open digital voice protocol intended for amateur radio use. By November 2019, he had been working on the project for about a year and was seeking contributors with skills in software development, hardware design, and prototyping. The project subsequently developed through an international group of contributors and has been described as an open alternative to proprietary digital voice systems.

In an interview published by the Polish Amateur Radio Union in August 2022, Kaczmarski said that the idea for M17 originated at the SP5KAB amateur radio club in Warsaw around the turn of 2018–2019, and that the project's name was derived from the club's address, Mokotowska 17.

In July 2022, Kaczmarski presented at Politecnico di Milano at an event titled Free and Open Source Digital Radio, alongside Niccolò Izzo. The event covered the M17 digital radio protocol and OpenRTX firmware. A recording of the presentation is available on YouTube.

The M17 Project also announced hardware developments including Module17, OpenHT, and a Remote Radio Unit (RRU). A 2024 report in TAPR's PSR identified Kaczmarski as the project's founder and lead developer. In April 2024, Steve Stroh reported on Kaczmarski's videos documenting the RRU and the associated Common Amateur Radio Interface (CARI).

== M17 Foundation ==
The M17 Foundation describes itself as a legal entity established to represent activities related to M17 protocol development and to protect associated assets, including intellectual property. Its website states that it is registered in Warsaw, Poland, and lists Kaczmarski as a member of its board.

In mid-July 2025, Jonathan Naylor (G4KLX), the primary developer of the Multi Mode Digital Voice Modem (MMDVM) software, removed M17 support from the MMDVM codebase. Because many MMDVM units were configured to receive automatic software updates, the change caused internet hotspots and repeaters using those units to lose M17 functionality. Michael Clemens (DK1MI) subsequently developed the WPSD-M17 Community Fork, which restored M17 functionality for most MMDVM units.

The removal was followed by a public dispute between Naylor and the M17 Foundation concerning the M17 project's administration, funding, and technical design. Kaczmarski, writing as a member of the Foundation's board, published a point-by-point response to Naylor's statements. Amateur Radio Digital Communications (ARDC), which had funded both the M17 Project and MMDVM, acknowledged that a conflict had emerged between the two grant recipients and stated that it would not mediate the disagreement.

== LinHT transceiver development ==
Kaczmarski has also worked on open-source radio hardware, including LinHT, a handheld platform designed to support experimental communication modes.

In August 2025, open-source software advocate Bruce Perens described LinHT as "the most important hardware project in Amateur Radio today". Perens, who was serving on the M17 Foundation's advisory board, highlighted its Linux-based software-defined radio architecture and its potential to support experimental communication modes.

In the same month's column on QRZ.com, amateur radio writer Dave Jensen discussed LinHT as Kaczmarski's next open-source radio project after M17. The article also quoted from Kaczmarski's 2024 open letter, in which he argued that proprietary hardware and software limit users' ability to modify amateur radio equipment.

Kaczmarski's arguments concerning support for open-source amateur radio development were also discussed by amateur radio writer Jason Milldrum, who agreed with the need for more sustainable funding but advocated a different, user-funded approach.

== Other technical work ==
In March/April 2023, Kaczmarski and Jay Francis (KA1PQK) co-authored an article in QEX titled Designing a Square Root Nyquist Filter for a Modern Digital Radio Protocol (issue 335, pp. 20–24).

In an August 2022 interview published by the Polish Amateur Radio Union, Kaczmarski said that he had joined the FreeDV Technical Committee that month, with the aim of contributing to the coordination of Codec 2 development and its applications in amateur radio.

In October 2024, Kaczmarski and Grzegorz Kaczmarek identified the CRC and Reed–Solomon codes used in the timecode transmitted by Poland's 225 kHz longwave transmitter (PCSK225). Their findings were documented in their respective open-source decoder repositories.

== Awards and recognition ==
Kaczmarski was one of the recipients of the 2021 American Radio Relay League (ARRL) Technical Innovation Award, in recognition of his development of the M17 digital radio communication protocol. The ARRL announced the award in July 2022.

== See also ==
- Open-source software
- Codec 2
