= MCW =

MCW may mean:

== Higher education ==
- Master of Creative Writing - a postgraduate education degree offered in New Zealand and Australia, similar to a Master of Fine Arts in creative writing in the United States
- Medical College of Wisconsin, private medical school in Milwaukee, Wisconsin

== Sports ==
- Maryland Championship Wrestling - a professional wrestling promotion based in Maryland
- Melbourne City Wrestling - a professional wrestling promotion based in Melbourne
- Memphis Championship Wrestling - a professional wrestling promotion based in Memphis
- Michael Carter-Williams, American professional basketball player
- Micro Championship Wrestling - a Midget wrestling promotion based in St. Petersburg, Florida

== Other ==
- Mason City Municipal Airport in Mason City, Iowa (IATA Code: MCW)
- Metro Cammell Weymann, former United Kingdom bus manufacturer
- Modulated continuous wave, method for transmitting continuous wave information over other types of radio emissions
- Mountain Cold Weather, mountain warfare training at Norwich University in Vermont
