= RIGblaster Nomic =

Radio/computer interface device

The RIGblaster Nomic is a radio/computer interface device used by amateur radio operators to connect their analog radio transceiver to their computer's analog sound inputs and outputs.

When used in conjunction with appropriate software, it allows the operator to transmit and receive using many digital modes, including packet, PSK31, and RTTY. Its name is a contraction of the words "no mic", from "no microphone", because when the nomic is connected in its most common configuration, it takes the place of the radio's external microphone, speaker, and push to talk (PTT) switch. This makes it easy to use with over 2000 different radios due to its universal design.

Other RIGblaster models, the plus and the pro have automatic switching between the computer and the radio's microphone.

Although the RIGblaster Nomic is a particular product of the West Mountain Radio corporation, the term "Nomic" is somewhat genericized and is sometimes used to refer to home-built devices which serve the same function, although they are more generally called "sound card to radio interfaces".

The RIGblaster Nomic can be used with the Amateur Radio VOIP system Echolink, as well as with Packet, APRS and most other modes of amateur radio operation.
