= ICOM IC-905 =

Amateur radio transceiver

The ICOM IC-905 is a multimode VHF/UHF/SHF portable amateur radio transceiver.

== About ==
The radio has between 10 and 0.5 watts of transmitter output, depending on the frequency selected.

The radio was announced by ICOM on 22 August 2022 at the Tokyo Ham Radio Fair in Japan.

The IC-905 has support for a wide variety of commonly used amateur radio modes, including the Japan Amateur Radio League's digital voice mode, DSTAR.

The form factor of the control head for the IC-905 is similar to that of the IC-705, and includes its large screen and spectrum scope. The radio unit is remotely controlled from a distance in order to reduce loss over long coax cable runs. This is an important adaptation for this radio system, as losses increase with the frequency being used. The IC-905 uses a built-in GPS receiver to stabilize its frequency and time base. The IC-905 has a wide range of frequencies, but lacks the 222MHz and 902MHz amateur bands, as these are only available in North America. The unit supports up to four external antennas (one being for GPS reception), and has built-in support for wired Ethernet and USB Type C, and an SD card reader. The addition of a USB connector allows users to connect their computers to the IC-905 for running digital data modes such as PSK31, or FT8. The integration of Ethernet support is a useful feature for mobile contesters.

== Specifications ==
Specifications of the ICOM IC-905:

- Frequency range: transmit: 144 – 5,600 MHz (amateur bands only)
- Modes of emission: A1A (CW), A3E (AM), J3E (LSB, USB), F3E (FM),
- Output connectors: N connector 144–1,300 MHz; SMA 2.4 and 5.6 GHz
- Supply voltage: 13.8 VDC external
- Output power: 10 watts 144–1,300 MHz; 2 watts 2.4 & 5.6 GHz; 500 milliwatts 10 GHz
