= Bridging Systems Interface =

Bridging Systems Interface is a standard protocol for communicating with physical interfaces which attach analog or digital voice radios to digital data networks—known as 'Radio over IP'--to make easier the use of remote radios by local users, and the sharing of radios by multiple users, in the service of improving emergency communications interoperability. The standard is promulgated by the SAFECOM program in the US Department of Homeland Security's Office for Interoperability and Compatibility, specifically, the VoIP Working Group .

== Technical Details ==
The working group has broken down the problem of moving public safety communications audio over data (usually TCP/IP) networks into 5 specific interface points:

- Radio System Interface – an interface that enables VoIP communication to radio system infrastructure
- Dispatch Interface – an interface to a dispatch console
- End Unit (Software Device) Interface – an interface that allows a network-connected computing device to connect into a radio system using a software implementation
- Radio Site Interface – an interface to a base station or similar device
- Bridging Systems Enhanced Interface – additional functions of the BSI Core Profile, an interface between bridging or gateway devices

To quote the working group's pseudo-RFC standards proposal :

A bridging system is a device that enables voice communication among disparate radio frequencies, systems, or technologies. The disparate devices connected via a bridging device may include land mobile radios, analog phones, mobile phones, IP telephones, and personal computers; however, this is not an exhaustive list of connective devices. The interface through which bridging systems communicate with each other is the Bridging Systems Interface (BSI).

This interface is based on SIP, the Session Initiation Protocol, and the document provides standardized mappings between that protocol and the actual functions that are provided by individual radio hardware, whatever those might be.
