= Internet remote base =

Type of ham radio remote base station

An Internet Remote Base (IRB) is a ham radio remote base station controlled via an internetwork such as the Internet. IRBs are used to provide time-shared access to control radio transceivers or receivers, such as used by licensed Amateur Radio operators.

== History ==
The United States Air Force pioneered the use of IRBs with the modernization of the High Frequency Global Communications System (HFGCS) in 2000.

This was followed closely by the introduction of several solutions publicly available in early 2000s by Keith Lamonica (W7DXX) and Bob Arnold (N2JEU), using an HTML form, Stan Schretter (W4MQ), using a locally installed client and UDP, and Earl Claus (KB2LWS), using Flash, Remote Scripting, and XML.
