= Remote base station =

Amateur radio auxiliary station

A remote base station is a common name for an amateur radio auxiliary station that is controlled and operated from a remote location. Most remote base stations have similar features to any other Amateur radio station but can be controlled over a direct wired connection or the internet, or by radio.

In many ways, remote base stations controlled by radio, resemble repeaters with additional features. Remote base stations are usually run and maintained by individual hobbyists or clubs. Unlike repeaters, they are not usually open to all amateur radio operators. A remote base is one type of station where the primary control point is not at the station location.

When using a radio link, remotely controlling an auxiliary base station consists of sending the primary signal (voice or data) along with some form of control signal, such as DTMF tones, to another station to change its operating parameters i.e. turn it on or off, change frequency or transmitter power level, rotate the antenna, etc. These signals are considered one form of primary station control, for which the station licensee, and/or a control operator are primarily responsible.

References in two paragraphs following are noted in square brackets and refer to the United States FCC Regulation 97 28th Revised Edition Updated to January 2012, governing the Amateur Radio Service.

In the United States, radio control link frequencies must be above 144.5 MHz. [97.201(b)] However, the base station being controlled may operate on any amateur frequency. The FCC says that if a radio link is used, the station where the control commands are performed is an auxiliary station, [97.213(a)] and an auxiliary station is "an amateur station transmitting communications point-to-point within a system of cooperating amateur stations" [97.3(a)(7)]

Start of the 21st century technology has enabled ham radio operators to control remote bases via the Internet. Many people use IRLP or Echolink to remotely control their stations.

Telecommand is defined by the Federal Communications Commission as a one-way transmission to initiate, modify or terminate functions of a device at a distance [97.3(a)(43)]. Control (or telecommand) links for a remote base station may be wire (telephone line, fiber optic line, Internet, etc.) or radio.
