= RIPRNet =

United States military network

RIPRNet (Radio over Internet Protocol Routed Network) is a United States military network that allows system designers and deployment personnel to connect radios in remote locations to local dispatch consoles exchanging radio voice data over an IP routed network. In 2007, RIPRNet was being installed in Iraq for use by United States and Coalition forces.

RIPRNet is a tactical system, whose end-users are trucks or mobile forces. Part of the IP network is routed over strategic systems to increase connectivity.

As of July 2007, 14 core sites and 37 ground station consoles were operational, costing "less than $10 million (US dollars) to implement, and is expected to cost 300,000 a year to maintain."
