= National Interop =

- Industry: Systems Integration

National Interop is a systems integration company with some of the earliest experience with Radio over IP technologies as deployed for public safety communications. The company was founded by public safety personnel.

One of the principals of the company testified in the U.S. Senate in 2007 on the applicability of Radio over IP (RoIP) as an alternative to the expensive statewide interoperable radio systems then being proposed for funding by the federal government at costs of about $US 1B per state.

The company designed and implemented a RoIP-powered system for Air Evac Lifeteam spanning 14 states with 80+ radio towers and a 24x7 9-1-1 type dispatch center, as well as numerous smaller RoIP systems.

National Interop works with any and all RoIP technologies, as each may be best suited for each particular public safety application.
