= Wide-coverage Internet Repeater Enhancement System =

Wide-coverage Internet Repeater Enhancement System (WIRES) is a de facto standard created by Yaesu designed to link compatible amateur radio repeaters over Voice over IP, allowing any home station using those repeaters to communicate with each other over VoIP.

WIRES uses DTMF signaling to make a connection over the Internet from a repeater or home station to another WIRES-equipped station that is accessible over the Internet. No proprietary tones or connection formats are used, so any manufacturer's radio (equipped with a DTMF encoding keypad) may be used to bring up the Internet link.

== Internet linking system versions ==
- WIRES - began as an experimental Internet linking project in the United States (California), and the initial Beta testing led to the development of an expanded and enhanced protocol with WIRES II.
- WIRES II - Yaesu did terminate WIRES-II service on Saturday, September 30, 2017 at 06:00 UTC. They suggested in the future, to use the WIRES-X Internet linking system.
- WIRES-X - Supports the C4FM digital and the voice technology. It enables high sound quality by repeating C4FM digital data as it is via the Internet.

== See also ==
- EchoLink
- eQSO
- Internet Radio Linking Project
- Free Radio Network (NL)
- Free Radio Network (DE)
