= Modulated continuous wave =

Alternative Morse code transmission technique

Modulated continuous wave (MCW) is Morse code telegraphy transmitted using an audio tone to modulate a carrier wave.

Continuous wave (CW), by contrast, does not use a subcarrier, so there is no emission at all between Morse code symbols.

MCW can be generated by any AM or FM radio transmitter with audio input from an audio oscillator or equivalent audio source. When an SSB transmitter is modulated by Morse code of only a single audio frequency, the resulting radio frequency emission is J2A or J2B and therefore is CW by definition, not MCW.

== Amplitude Modulation (AM) ==
MCW on AM would typically be sent as double-sideband amplitude modulation, with one channel containing digital information, and using a subcarrier, also known as A2A. For example, Morse code sent in an AM broadcast by a commercial radio station would be modulated CW as it contains a subcarrier.

This mode is designated A2A by the Federal Communications Commission. The symbols stand for: A (amplitude modulation), 2 (one channel containing digital information, using a subcarrier), A (aural telegraphy).

Single-sideband modulation with full carrier (H2A/H2B) is another form of modulated CW (MCW).

Amateur radio operators may also use A2A to transmit Morse code, however it would be more typical to send it as CW, rather than MCW, using single-sideband modulation with a suppressed carrier, which reduces the bandwidth and power requirements. The FCC designates this mode as either aural telegraphy (J2A) if intended to be decoded by ear, or otherwise as electronic telegraphy (J2B), if it's intended to be decoded by machine).

Unlike A1A CW transmissions (double sideband, with no subcarrier), A2A MCW will produce an audible audio tone from an AM radio receiver that is not equipped with a beat oscillator. MCW is commonly used by RDF beacons to transmit the station identifier.

== Frequency Modulation (FM) ==
When Morse code is transmitted using frequency modulation (FM), it is a form of MCW.

The FCC designates this mode as F2A: F (frequency modulation), 2 (one channel containing digital information, using a subcarrier), A (aural telegraphy).

F2A MCW Morse can be heard on a normal FM radio receiver, and it is commonly used by both commercial and amateur repeater stations for identification. Also, F2A is sometimes used by other types of stations operating under automatic control, such as a telemetry transmitter or a remote base station.

== Classification and other forms ==
In the United States, the Federal Communications Commission defines modulated continuous wave in 47 CFR §97.3(c)(4) as "Tone-modulated international Morse code telegraphy emissions having designators with A, C, D, F, G, H or R as the first symbol; 2 as the second symbol; A or B as the third symbol." These symbols are defined by the International Telecommunication Union. The FCC classifies International Morse code telegraphy emissions as "digital information".

All Modulated CW (MCW) emission types listed by the FCC (all are one channel and use a subcarrier):

- Double-sideband amplitude modulation (A2A, A2B) – e.g. AM broadcast radio
- Vestigial sideband (C2A, C2B)
- Combination of AM and FM or PM (D2A, D2B)
- Frequency modulation (F2A, F2B) — e.g. FM broadcast radio
- Phase modulation (G2B)
- Single-sideband modulation with full carrier (H2A, H2B)
- Single-sideband with reduced or variable carrier (R2A, R2B).

All CW emission types (not MCW), listed by the FCC (all are one channel):

- Double-sideband amplitude modulation, no subcarrier (A1A, A1B)
- Vestigial sideband, no subcarrier (C1A, C1B)
- Single-sideband modulation with full carrier, no subcarrier (H1A, H1B)
- Single-sideband with suppressed carrier, no subcarrier (J1A, J1B)
- Single-sideband with suppressed carrier, with subcarrier (J2A, J2B)
- Single-sideband with reduced or variable carrier, no subcarrier (R1A, R1B)

== See also ==
- Morse code
- Prosigns for Morse code
- Types of radio emissions
- On–off keying
