= ICOM IC-705 =

Amateur radio transceiver

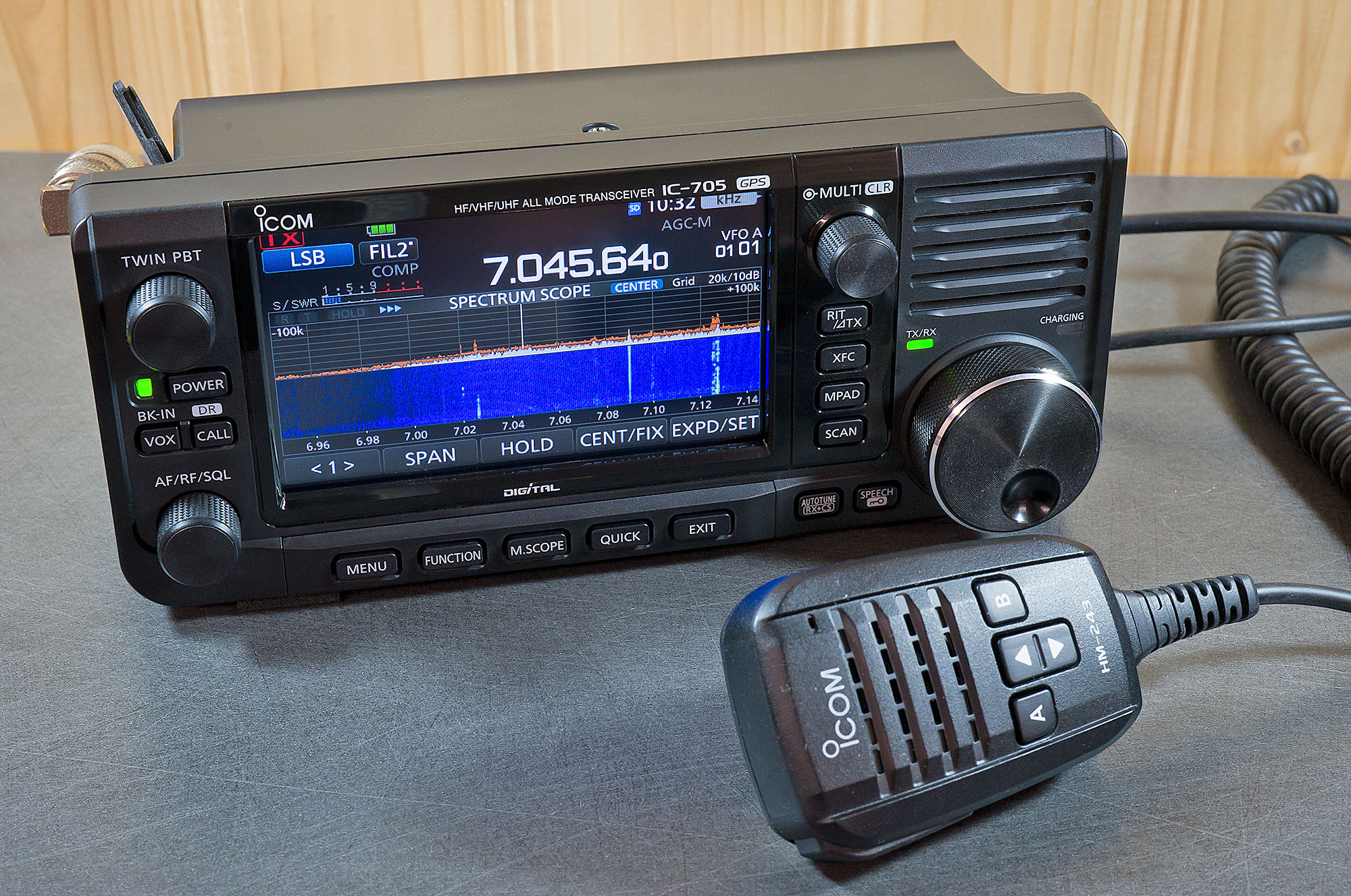
An ICOM IC-705 radio, tuned to the 40-meter band

The ICOM IC-705 is a multimode HF/VHF/UHF portable amateur radio transceiver. The radio has 5 watts of output when using its internal battery and 10 watts of output when using external power. With the rise in award programs such as Summits on the Air and Parks on the Air, this lightweight fully functional radio is a popular choice for people using them in the field. The IC-705 has support for a wide variety of commonly used amateur radio modes, including ICOM's proprietary digital voice mode, D-STAR. The IC-705 is also one of the first mainstream amateur radios to use SDR technology instead of the older superheterodyne design. The IC-705 has multiple extra features that are useful when operating in the field. Supporting the radio's D-STAR module is a GPS receiver to allow users to send their location though the D-STAR network, as well as help locate nearby repeater systems. In addition to the GPS receiver, the radio supports 2.4 GHz Wi-Fi, which allows users to connect their computers or tablets to the IC-705 for running digital data modes such as PSK31, Winlink, and FT8.

The radio has been praised for its size, easy-to-use menus, large easy-to-read screen and the quality of its build. Common criticisms of the radio include its lack of a built-in antenna tuner and its price, compared to other more powerful radios on the market.

== Specifications ==
Specifications of the ICOM IC-705:

- Frequency range: Tx: 1.8 – 450 MHz (amateur bands only) Rx: 30 kHz – 199.999 MHz and 400-470 MHz
- Modes of emission: A1A (CW), A3E (AM), J3E (LSB, USB), F3E (FM)
- Impedance: BNC connector 50 ohms, unbalanced
- Supply voltage: 7.4 VDC internal or 13.8 VDC external
- Current consumption: 7.4 VDC Rx: 0.8 A Tx: 2.5 A | 13.8 VDC Rx: 0.5 A Tx: 3 A
- Case size (WxHxD): 200×83.5×82 mm; 7.9×3.3×3.2 in
- Weight (approx.): 1.1 kg; 2.4 lb
- Output power: 5W internal battery, 10W external power source
- Transmitter modulation
  - SSB: digital PSN modulation
  - AM: digital low power modulation
  - FM: digital phase modulation
  - DV: GMSK digital phase modulation
- Receiver system
  - 0.030 to 24.999 MHz RF direct sampling
  - 25.000 MHz and above down conversion IF sampling
