= Codec 2 =

Low-bitrate speech encoding format

- Developer: David Grant Rowe
- Release: August 25, 2010
- Stable release: 1.2.0 / June 24, 2023; 3 years ago
- Written in: C99
- Platform: Cross-platform
- Type: Audio codec
- License: GNU LGPL, v2.1
- Website: www.rowetel.com?page_id=452
- Repository: github.com/drowe67/codec2

Codec 2 is a low-bitrate speech audio codec (speech coding) that is patent free and open source. Codec 2 compresses speech using sinusoidal coding, a method specialized for human speech. Bit rates of 3200 to 450 bit/s have been successfully created. Codec 2 was designed to be used for amateur radio and other high compression voice applications.

== Overview ==
The codec was developed by David Grant Rowe, with support and cooperation of other researchers (e.g., Jean-Marc Valin from Opus).

Codec 2 consists of 3200, 2400, 1600, 1400, 1300, 1200, 700 and 450 bit/s codec modes. It outperforms most other low-bitrate speech codecs. For example, it uses half the bandwidth of Advanced Multi-Band Excitation to encode speech with similar quality. The speech codec uses 16-bit PCM sampled audio, and outputs packed digital bytes. When sent packed digital bytes, it outputs PCM sampled audio. The audio sample rate is fixed at 8 kHz.

The reference implementation is open source and is freely available in a GitHub repository. The source code is released under the terms of version 2.1 of the GNU Lesser General Public License (LGPL). It is programmed in C and current source code requires floating-point arithmetic, although the algorithm itself does not require this. The reference software package also includes a frequency-division multiplex digital voice software modem and a graphical user interface based on WxWidgets. The software is developed on Linux and a port for Microsoft Windows created with Cygwin is offered in addition to an Apple MacOS version.

The codec has been presented in various conferences and has received the 2012 ARRL Technical Innovation Award, and the Linux Australia Conference's Best Presentation Award.

== Technology ==
Internally, parametric audio coding algorithms operate on 10 ms PCM frames using a model of the human voice. Each of these audio segments is declared voiced (vowel) or unvoiced (consonant).

Codec 2 uses sinusoidal coding to model speech, which is closely related to that of multi-band excitation codecs. Sinusoidal coding is based on regularities (periodicity) in the pattern of overtone frequencies and layers harmonic sinusoids. Spoken audio is recreated by modelling speech as a sum of harmonically related sine waves with independent amplitudes called line spectral pairs, or LSP, on top of a determined fundamental frequency of the speaker's voice (pitch). The (quantised) pitch and the amplitude (energy) of the harmonics are encoded, and with the LSP's are exchanged across a channel in a digital format. The LSP coefficients represent the Linear Predictive Coding (LPC) model in the frequency domain, and lend themselves to a robust and efficient quantisation of the LPC parameters.

The digital bytes are in a bit-field format that have been packed together into bytes. These bit fields are also optionally gray coded before being grouped together. The gray coding may be useful if sending raw, but normally an application will just burst the bit fields out. The bit fields make up the various parameters that are stored or exchanged (pitch, energy, voicing Booleans, LSP's, etc.).

For example, Mode 3200, has 20 ms of audio converted to 64 bits. So 64 bits will be output every 20 ms (50 times a second), for a minimum data rate of 3200 bit/s. These 64 bits are sent as 8 bytes to the application, which has to unwrap the bit fields, or send the bytes over a data channel.

Another example is Mode 1300, which is sent 40 ms of audio, and outputs 52 bits every 40 ms (25 times a second), for a minimum rate of 1300 bit/s. These 52 bits are sent as 7 bytes to the application or data channel.

== Adoption ==
Codec 2 is currently used in several radios and Software Defined Radio Systems:

- FreeDV
- FlexRadio 6000 series
- SM1000
- Quisk
- M17 Project
- DTC Sentry Mesh 6161 MANET radio

Codec 2 has also been integrated into FreeSWITCH and there's a patch available for support in Asterisk. Reticulum's LXST uses Codec 2 when operating in Ultra low-bandwidth profile, such as over LORA interfaces.

There was an FM-to-Codec2 digital voice repeater in earth orbit on amateur radio CubeSat LilacSat-1 (call sign ON02CN, QB50 constellation), which was launched and subsequently deployed from the International Space Station in 2017.

== History ==
The prominent free software advocate and radio amateur Bruce Perens lobbied for the creation of a free speech codec for operation at less than 5 kbit/s. Since Perens did not have the background himself, he approached Jean-Marc Valin in 2008, who introduced him to lead developer David Grant Rowe, who has worked with Valin on Speex on several occasions. Rowe himself was also a radio amateur (amateur radio call sign VK5DGR) and had experience in creating and using voice codecs and other signal processing algorithms for speech signals. He obtained a PhD in speech coding in the 1990s and was involved in the development of one of the first satellite telephony systems (Mobilesat).

He agreed to the task and announced his decision to work on a format on August 21, 2009. He built on the research and findings from his doctoral thesis. The underlying sinusoidal modelling goes back to developments by Robert J. McAulay and Thomas F. Quatieri (MIT Lincoln labs) from the mid-1980s.

In August 2010, David Rowe published version 0.1 alpha. Version 0.2 was released towards the end of 2011, introducing a mode with 1,400 bits/s and significant improvements in quantization.

In January 2012, at linux.conf.au, Jean-Marc Valin helped improve the quantization of line spectral pairs, which Rowe is less familiar with. After several changes to the available bit rate modes in winter and spring 2011/2012, 2,400, 1,400 and 1,200 bit/s modes were available after May of that year.

Codec 2 700C, a new mode with a bit rate of 700 bit/s, was finished in early 2017.

In July 2018 an experimental 450 bit/s mode was demonstrated, which was developed as part of a master thesis at the University of Erlangen-Nuremberg. By clever training of the vector quantization the data rate could be further reduced based on the principle of the 700C mode.
