= D-STAR =

Digital voice and data protocol specification for amateur radio

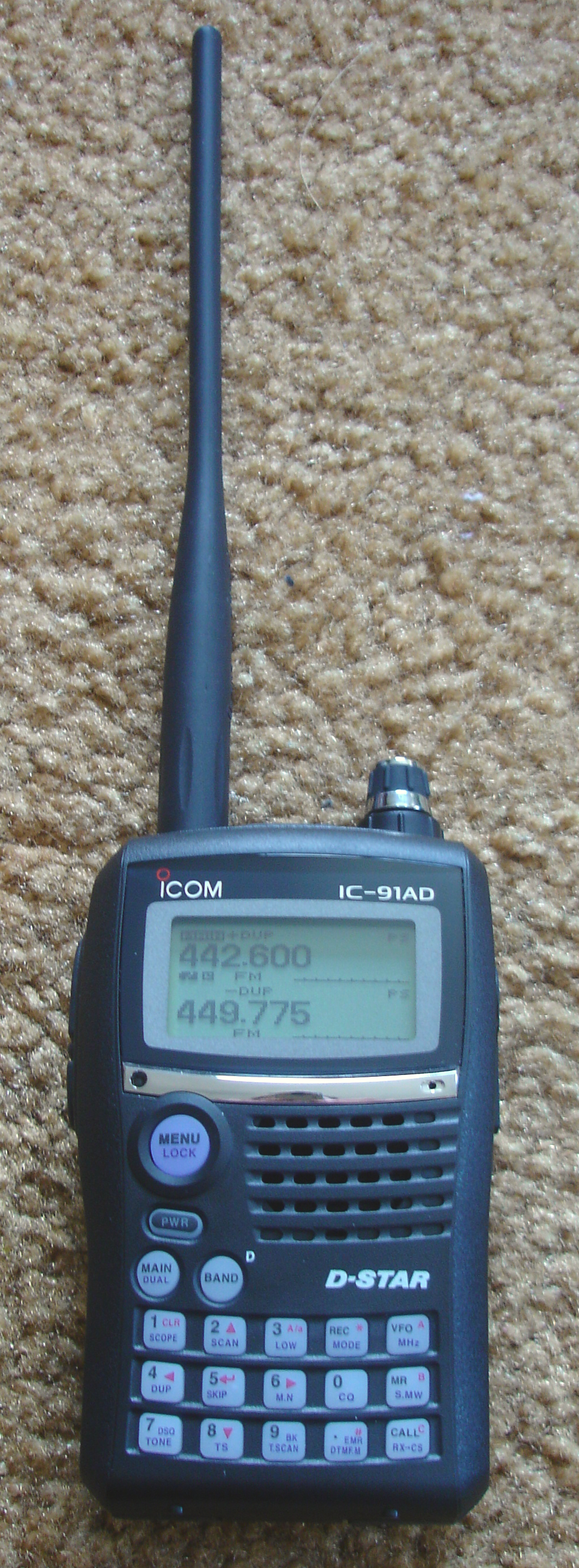
ICOM IC-91AD handheld transceiver with the D-STAR UT-121 digital voice board installed

D-STAR (Digital Smart Technologies for Amateur Radio) is a digital voice and data protocol specification for amateur radio. The system was developed in the late 1990s by the Japan Amateur Radio League and uses minimum-shift keying in its packet-based standard. There are other digital modes that have been adapted for use by amateurs, but D-STAR was the first that was designed specifically for amateur radio.

Several advantages of using digital voice modes are that it uses less bandwidth than older analog voice modes such as amplitude modulation and frequency modulation. The quality of the data received is also better than an analog signal at the same signal strength, as long as the signal is above a minimum threshold and as long as there is no multipath propagation.

D-STAR-compatible radios are available for HF, VHF, UHF, and microwave amateur radio bands. In addition to the over-the-air protocol, D-STAR also provides specifications for network connectivity, enabling D-STAR radios to be connected to the Internet or other networks, allowing streams of voice or packet data to be routed via amateur radio.

D-STAR-compatible radios are manufactured by Icom, Kenwood, and FlexRadio Systems.

== History ==
In 1998, an investigation into finding a new way of bringing digital technology to amateur radio was started. The process was funded by a ministry of the Japanese government, then called the Ministry of Posts and Telecommunications, and administered by the Japan Amateur Radio League. In 2001, D-STAR was published as the result of the research.

In September 2003, Icom named Matt Yellen, KB7TSE (now K7DN), to lead its US D-STAR development program.

Starting in April 2004, Icom began releasing new "D-STAR optional" hardware. The first to be released commercially, was a 2-meter mobile unit designated IC-2200H. Icom followed up with 2-meter and 440 MHz handheld transceivers the next year. However, the yet to be released UT-118 add-on card was required for these radios to operate in D-STAR mode. Eventually, the card became available and once installed into the radios, it provided D-STAR connectivity. The June 2005 edition of the American Radio Relay League's QST magazine reviewed the Icom IC-V82.

JARL released some changes to the existing D-STAR standard in late 2004. Icom, aware that the changes were coming, delayed the release of their hardware in anticipation of the changes.

The Icom ID-1 1.3 GHz mobile radio was released in late 2004. The ID-1 was the first D-STAR radio that provided digital data (DD) mode operation. In this mode, data can be transferred at 128 kbit/s as a wireless bridge via the RJ-45 Ethernet jack on the radios. It was the only radio to provide this function until the release of the IC-9700 in 2019.

The first D-STAR satellite QSO occurred between Michael, N3UC, in Haymarket, Virginia and Robin, AA4RC, in Atlanta, Georgia while working AMSAT's AO-27 microsatellite (Miniaturized satellite) in 2007. The two experienced minor difficulty with doppler shift during the QSO.

As of late 2009, there are around 10,800 D-STAR users talking through D-STAR repeaters with Internet connectivity via the G2 Gateway. There are approximately 550 G2 enabled repeaters now active. Note, these numbers do not include users with D-STAR capabilities that are not within range of a repeater, or working through D-STAR repeaters that do not have Internet connectivity.

The first D-STAR capable microsatellite was launched in early 2016. OUFTI-1 is a CubeSat built by Belgian students at the University of Liège and I.S.I.L (Haute École de la Province de Liège). The name is an acronym for Orbital Utility For Telecommunication Innovation. The goal of the project is to develop expertise in various aspects of satellite design and operation. The satellite weighs just 1 kilogram and utilizes a UHF uplink and a VHF downlink.

In 2015, FlexRadio Systems added D-STAR support to their line of HF transceivers and receivers via a software upgrade. D-STAR support requires the addition of the ThumbDV device from NW Digital Radio.

== Technical details ==
The system today is capable of linking repeaters together locally and through the Internet utilizing callsigns for routing of traffic. Servers are linked via TCP/IP utilizing proprietary "gateway" software, available from Icom. This allows amateur radio operators to talk to any other amateurs participating in a particular gateway "trust" environment. The current master gateway in the United States is operated by the K5TIT group in Texas, who were the first to install a D-STAR repeater system in the U.S.

D-STAR transfers both voice and data via digital encoding over the 2 m (VHF), 70 cm (UHF), and 23 cm (1.3 GHz) amateur radio bands. There is also an interlinking radio system for creating links between systems in a local area on 10 GHz, which is valuable to allow emergency communications oriented networks to continue to link in the event of internet access failure or overload.

Within the D-STAR Digital Voice protocol standards (DV), voice audio is encoded as a 3,600 bit/s data stream using proprietary AMBE encoding, with 1,200 bit/s FEC, leaving 1,200 bit/s for an additional data "path" between radios utilizing DV mode. On air bit rates for DV mode are 4,800 bit/s over the 2 m, 70 cm and 23 cm bands.

In addition to digital voice mode (DV), a Digital Data (DD) mode can be sent at 128 kbit/s only on the 23 cm band. A higher-rate data protocol, currently believed to be much like ATM, is used in the 10 GHz "link" radios for site-to-site links.

Radios providing DV data service within the low-speed voice protocol variant typically use an RS-232 or USB connection for low-speed data (1,200 bit/s), while the Icom ID-1 and IC-9700 radios offer a standard Ethernet connection for high-speed (128 kbit/s) connections on the 23 cm band. This allows easy interfacing with computer equipment.

=== Gateway server ===
The current gateway control software rs-rp2c version G2, more commonly called "Gateway 2.0". Though most Linux distributions should be suitable, the recommended configuration uses CentOS Linux 5.1 with the latest updates, typically running (kernel 2.4.20. glibc 2.3.2 and BIND 9.2.1 or later). The CPU should be 2.4 GHz or faster and the memory should at least be 512 MB or greater. There should be two network interface cards and at least 10 GB free of hard drive space which includes the OS install. Finally for middleware, Apache 2.0.59, Tomcat 5.5.20, mod_jk2 2.0.4, OpenSSL 0.9.8d, Java SE 5.0 and postgreSQL 8.2.3 are utilized, but these can be different as updates occur.

Along with the open-source tools, the Icom proprietary dsipsvd or "D-STAR IP Service Daemon" and a variety of crontab entries utilize a mixture of the local PostgreSQL and BIND servers to look up callsigns and "pcname" fields (stored in BIND) which are mapped to individual 10.x.x.x internal-only addresses for routing of both voice and data traffic between participating gateways.

During installation, the Gateway 2.0 software installation script builds most of the Web-based open-source tools from source for standardization purposes, while utilizing some of the packages of the host Linux system, thus making CentOS 5.1 the common way to deploy a system, to keep incompatibilities from occurring in both package versions and configuration.

Additionally, gateways operating on the U.S. trust server are asked during initial setup to install DStarMonitor which is an add-on tool that allows the overall system administrators to see the status of each Gateway's local clock and other processes and PIDs needed for normal system operation, and also sends traffic and other data to servers operated under the domain name of "dstarusers.org". By this means a complete tracking of user behaviour is technically possible. Installation of this software also includes JavaAPRSd, a Java-based APRS interface which is utilized on Gateway 2.0 systems to interface between the Icom/D-STAR GPS tracking system called DPRS to the more widely known and utilized amateur radio APRS system.

==== How Gateway G2 works ====
Each participating amateur station wanting to use repeaters/gateways attached to a particular trust server domain must "register" with a gateway as their "home" system, which also populates their information into the trust server—a specialized central gateway system—which allows for lookups across a particular trust server domain. Only one "registration" per trust domain is required. Each amateur is set aside eight 10.x.x.x internal IP addresses for use with their callsign or radios, and various naming conventions are available to utilize these addresses if needed for specialized callsign routing. Most amateurs will need only a handful of these "registered" IP addresses, because the system maps these to callsigns, and the callsign can be entered into multiple radios.

The gateway machine controls two network interface controllers, the "external" one being on a real 10.x.x.x network behind a router. A router that can perform network address translation on a single public IP address (can be static or dynamic in Gateway G2 systems) to a full 10.x.x.x/8 network is required. From there, the Gateway has another NIC connected directly to the D-STAR repeater controller via 10BASE-T and the typical configuration is a 172.16.x.x (/24) pair of addresses between the gateway and the controller.

==== Differences between Gateway V1 and G2 ====
The main differences between Gateway V1 and G2 are the addition of a relational database (PostgreSQL) for more flexibility and control of updates, versus the previous use of only BIND for "database" activities, the addition of both an administrative and end-user Web interface for registration which was previously handled via command-line commands by the Gateway V1 system administrators, dropping the requirement for static public IP addresses for gateways, and the ability of the software to use a fully qualified domain name to find and communicate with the trust server, allowing for redundancy/failover options for the trust server administrators. Finally, a feature called "multicast" has been added for administrators to be able to provide users with a special "name" they can route calls to which will send their transmissions to up to ten other D-STAR repeaters at the same time. With cooperation between administrators, a "multicast group" can be created for multiple repeater networks or other events.

Another additional feature of Gateway G2 is the ability to use callsign "suffixes" appended to the user's callsign in a similar fashion to the repeaters and gateways in the original system, which allow for direct routing to a particular user's radio or between two user radios with the same base callsign, by utilizing the 8th most significant field of the callsign and adding a letter to that location, both in the gateway registration process on the web interface, and in the radios themselves.

==== Gateway V1 control software ====
The Gateway V1 software was similar to Gateway G2, and utilized Fedora Core 2+ or Red Hat Linux 9+ OS on a Pentium-grade 2.4 GHz or faster machine.

==== IrcDDBGateway ====
Gateway software developed by Jonathan Naylor, G4KLX, has a larger network of repeaters and users and is being adopted by former Gateway G2 users as the G2 system is closed source, only supports Icom repeaters, and runs on Centos 5.x which will reach end of life in March 2017. ircDDBGateway operates on the ircDDB and QuadNet2 networks and is licensed under GPL-2.0.

ircDDBGateway supports Icom controllers and repeaters, as well as homebrew repeaters and hotspots (simplex access points). It provides more linking and routing options over the Gateway V1 and G2.

ircDDBGateway can run on various distributions of Linux and versions of Microsoft Windows. Computer requirements can be as simple as a Raspberry Pi.

==== DStarGateway ====
Refactored ircDDBGateway by Geoffery Merck F4FXL. Known to support Icom 3rd Generation repeaters.

==== Add-on software ====
Various projects exist for gateway administrators to add "add-on" software to their gateways, including the most popular package called "dplus" created by Robin Cutshaw AA4RC. A large number of Gateway 2.0 systems are offering services added by this software package to their end-users, and users are getting used to having these features. Features include the ability to link systems directly, "voice mail" (a single inbox today), ability to play/record audio to and from the repeaters connected to the Gateway and the most important, the ability for DV-Dongle users to communicate from the Internet to the radio users on the repeaters.

There is often a misconception by users and system administrators alike that the Gateway 2.0 systems have these add-on features from dplus by default, a testament to the popularity of this add-on software. Dplus software development has an active following, and features such as multiple repeater/system connections similar to the type of linking done by other popular repeater-linking systems (IRLP and EchoLink) are being worked on.

== Criticisms ==
=== Proprietary codec ===
Like other commercial digital modes (P25, TETRA, DMR, dPMR, NXDN, System Fusion), D-STAR uses a closed-source proprietary voice codec (AMBE) patented by Digital Voice Systems, Inc. (DVSI) because it was the highest quality and only codec available in silicon when the system was released. Amateur radio operators do not have access to the specification of this codec or the rights to implement it on their own without buying a licensed product. Amateurs have a long tradition of building, improving upon and experimenting with their own radio designs. The modern digital age equivalent of this would be designing and/or implementing codecs in software. Critics say the proprietary nature of AMBE and its availability only in hardware form (as ICs) discourages innovation. Even critics praise the openness of the rest of the D-STAR standard which can be implemented freely. As of 2017 the patents have expired, as announced by Bruce Perens, K6BP at the 2017 ARRL/TAPR DCC in his State of Digital Voice talk.

=== Trademarked name ===
The term 'D-STAR' is itself a registered trademark of Icom. Icom also holds a trademark for its stylized D-STAR logo. There is no indication Icom is charging other vendors to use any of the D-STAR branding.

=== Usable range compared to FM ===
D-STAR, like any digital voice mode has comparable usable range to FM, but it degrades differently. While the quality of FM progressively degrades the farther a user moves away from the source, digital voice maintains a constant voice quality up to a point, then essentially "falls off a cliff". This behavior is inherent in any digital data system, and it demonstrates the threshold at which the signal is no longer correctable, and when data loss is too great, audio artifacts can appear in the recovered audio.

=== Emergency communications concerns ===
Many advanced D-STAR features rely on internet connections although simplex, repeated and crossband gateway voice and data communications do not. During widespread disasters that compromise commercial telecommunications infrastructure, D-STAR systems (as well as other modes that rely on the internet) may suffer outages or feature degradation that impacts operations. Without simulating such outages during drills, it is difficult to assess the impact of or establish D-STAR service recovery procedures in the event of such failures. As of the fall of 2011, there has been almost no discussion in the ham radio literature regarding actual drills where D-STAR systems were tested with completely failed or even intermittent telecommunications infrastructure. Comprehensive emergency communications plans used by ARES and other such organizations should address the possibility that such systems may not function as intended during major disasters.

The loss of Internet does not degrade the local operation of a D-STAR repeater system. Over the Internet linking and routing of traffic may be degraded. Some groups are using microwave-based systems, such as HamWAN, to link repeaters.

=== Cost ===
In Icom's radio line, D-STAR used to significantly add to the cost of a radio, which was a barrier to the adoption of the technology. While in 2006 the cost of a D-STAR radio was compared to that of a standard analog radio, and the price difference was nearly double, in 2024 D-STAR is standard fare in many amateur radio transceivers, fixed-base (Icom IC-9700), mobile (Icom IC-7100) and hand-held (Icom IC-705, IC-905, IC-50A and IC-52A). This decrease in price is due to the per-unit cost for the voice codec hardware and/or license and partly to manufacturer research and development costs that has now been amortized. As is the case with any product, as more units were sold, the R&D portion of the cost decreased over time.

FlexRadio Systems D-STAR implementation requires the use of an add-on module to their FLEX-6000 Series Radios.

=== Legality ===
Many have argued that the proprietary codec constitutes a form of encryption, and encryption is prohibited by almost every country's amateur radio licence conditions. According to FCC rules, in the United States, if the algorithm is publicly published or otherwise widely available enough that transmissions are not secret, it is considered encoding rather than encryption. D-STAR uses AMBE, a non-public codec, and in April 2010, French regulators issued a statement that rules D-STAR illegal in France, due to the ability to create a connection to the internet with it and the proprietary nature of the codec used. The French Amateur Radio society, DR@F - Digital Radioamateur France has an online petition against this ruling, calling for the government to allow the mode, as to ban it would deny them 'fundamental rights'.

== Non-Icom D-STAR repeaters ==
The world's first non-Icom D-Star repeater was developed by KB9KHM using a GMSK Node Adaptor developed by Satoshi Yasuda and DVAR Hotspot software developed by KB9KHM in 2008. This repeater could link over the Internet with other Icom repeater gateways and Reflectors via D-Plus. It did not support callsign routing or slash routing via the K5TIT G2 network.

The first non-Icom D-STAR repeater fully supporting the K5TIT G2 network and D-Plus, GB7MH, went live on 10 September 2009, in West Sussex, England. Whilst waiting for the DSL line installation, the repeater is connected to the Internet via a 3G dongle from network operator "Three". The system is built around Satoshi Yasuda's GMSK Node Adapter, a Mini-ITX system running CentOS 4, a Tait T800 repeater and G2 code written by G4ULF. All the usual G2 features such as callsign routing, D-Plus linkage and DPRS via D-STAR Monitor are supported.

Today a home-brewed D-STAR repeater can be built using open source software, used commercial radio equipment and a computer. One group advocating the construction of home-brewed D-STAR repeaters is Free-Star. Free-Star is an experimental approach to the implementation of a vendor neutral, and open source, digital communication network for amateur radio.

GB7LF in Lancaster, UK, went live in May 2009 and was a converted Tait repeater. It was preceded by two others in Weston-Super-Mare, UK and also another in Staffordshire, UK.

== Compatible programs and projects ==
D-StarLet

A Web-based text messaging application using D-STAR digital data technology.

D-StarLet is an open source client-server solution that allows content creation and modification from certain persons. D-StarLet interfaces with a D-STAR radio through the serial port. It works with Windows (98+), Linux (Red Hat 7.3+), Apple Mac OS X, and others.

D-PRS interface

D-PRS is GPS for ham radio. Includes DStarTNC2, javAPRSSrvr, DStarInterface, and TNC-X

DStarMonitor

A Java application run on the repeater gateway PC which logs activity on the attached repeaters. Additional features include APRS object representation of each repeater.

DStarQuery

DStarQuery monitors the low-speed data stream of a D-STAR radio looking for queries sent from a remote station. When a valid query is received, a predefined sequence is executed and the results transmitted from the station running DStarQuery. For example, a station transmits "?D*rptrs?" and it is received by a DStarQuery station which responds with a list of local repeaters.

The program D-PRS Interface includes a "Query" entry field that streamlines this process allowing the user to simply enter the desired command. Most DStarQuery systems will respond with a list of available commands when "?D*info?" is received.

D-STAR Comms PRO

An advanced software application for use with D-STAR enabled radios. Supports advanced text chat, personal messaging with auto-reply and inbox, e-mail gateway and a beacon mode. GPS Tracking / Logging and a GPS Beacon emulator and Internet linking. New features are added weekly and users can suggest new features through the D-STAR Comms forum. www.dstarcomms.com

D-STAR Star TV

Slow Scan TV for D-STAR radios and video streaming for Icom ID-1 by GM7HHB. Runs on Windows XP and Vista.

D-RATS

D-RATS is a D-STAR communications tool that supports text chat, TCP/IP forwarding, file transfers, and can act as an e-mail gateway. There is also the ability to map user's positions using the D’PRS function of D-STAR. The application is written in Python/GTK and is cross-platform. It runs on Windows, Mac OS X, and Linux. The application was developed by Dan Smith (KK7DS) for the Washington County Amateur Radio Emergency Service in Oregon.

D-STAR is able to send data to emergency responders in the event of a disaster. Served agencies can relate to sending e-mail or other documents to someone. The quantity of data sent can be higher compared to traditional amateur modes. Voice and even CW are capable of getting a message through albeit slowly, but D-STAR can transfer documents, images, and spreadsheets.

It was in the Great Coastal Gale of 2007 the Washington County ARES group was able to test D-STAR during this series of several strong Pacific storms that interrupted conventional communication systems for up to one week. Primary emergency traffic for the American Red Cross and the Vernonia, Oregon Fire Department was handled by the group using traditional FM voice because the group had no D-STAR repeater equipment available. Once the situation's communication needs became established the D*Chat messaging function was used to send small text transmissions via D-STAR simplex at distances of up to seventeen miles.

An ability for amateurs to send files during this weather event would have greatly increased the capacity for ARES to help during the emergency. Although D*Chat was a useful means of communication D-RATS was developed to help fill the gaps that may have been lacking. Another improvement over D*Chat that D-RATS provides is form support. Users can set up frequently used forms well before they are necessary and when the need comes all that is required is to fill in the fields. In this way, for example, emergency forms from the Red Cross, National Traffic System, or the Incident Command System, such as the FEMA standard ICS-213, could be generated and sent.

== Home-brew D-STAR radio ==
The first presumed D-STAR radio including pictures and diagrams can be found at Moetronix.com's Digital Voice Transceiver Project. This page includes the schematic, source, and whitepaper.

Another project is Satoshi Yasuda's (7M3TJZ/AD6GZ) experiments with a UT-118 DV adapter. This project involves interfacing Icom's UT-118 with other manufacturer's amateur radio transceivers. With this project some VHF/UHF/SHF amateur radio transceivers are capable of being adapted for D-STAR operation. This requires access to the receiver's discriminator and to the direct FM modulator of the radio, sometimes available at a 9,600 bit/s packet interface. Satoshi's product is no longer available. There is an alternative available at www.dutch-star.nl

Antoni Navarro (EA3CNO) also has designed another interface based on a PIC microprocessor and UT-118 module.

With the rise of cheap RTL-chip based Software Defined Radios, there also appeared various software decoders to decode digital speech information carried by radio signals. Recently, this also includes D-Star. There are third-party decoders available, either for the protocol data and for the digital speech content, but legal conflicts with the patented AMBE vocoder may exist in some jurisdictions.

== Equipment ==
- Homebrew
  - Decoder/Receivers:
    - Reception done by a Software Defined Radio and decoding of the D-Star header information done by the program dstar.exe.
    - Reception done by a Software Defined Radio and speech decoding done by the program DSD 1.7 (Digital Speech Decoder).
  - Repeater equipment:
    - GMSK Node Adapter - these devices are hardware GMSK modems with firmware to take D-STAR protocol frames over a USB cable and provide the necessary logic and GMSK modulation to control a simplex node or a full duplex repeater. One repeater that is easily adaptable is the Kenwood TKR-820 as documented by K7VE.
    - GMSK using a sound card - this method uses a computer sound card to generate GMSK modulation and de-modulation. The primary software for this method is developed by Jonathan Naylor. An example of a repeater system using this technique is the addition of D-STAR to the Yaesu DR-1X repeater by attaching the UDRC and a Raspberry Pi computer.
- Icom D-STAR equipment
  - Transceivers—D-STAR and Analog FM Capable:
    - Icom ID-1: 23 cm digital voice and digital data mobile transceiver. Power is selectable at 1 W or 10 W. USB control port and Ethernet connection for data. No longer available.
    - Icom IC-2820H/IC-E2820: 2 m / 70 cm twin band digital voice mobile transceiver. Power up to 50 W on each band. May be purchased with or without UT-123 D-STAR module. The D-STAR module includes a built-in GPS receiver with accompanying antenna.
    - Icom ID-31 and ID-31A: 70 cm digital voice hand held transceiver (5W). Includes a built-in GPS receiver and repeater database.
    - Icom ID-51 and ID-51A: 2 m / 70 cm dual band digital voice hand held transceiver (5W). Includes a built-in GPS receiver and DSTAR repeater database. Also reception of broadcast FM, AM, and shortwave.
    - Icom ID-51 Anniversary Edition and ID-51A Plus: 2 m / 70 cm dual band digital voice hand held transceiver (5W). Identical to ID-51A but adds FM repeater directory and higher speed (3600 bit/s) DV data mode.
    - Icom ID-51 and ID-51A Plus 2: identical to ID-51A Plus but adds Access point and Terminal mode.
    - Icom IC-705: HF/VHF/UHF 5w/10w Users can enjoy the latest G3 Gateway and DV mode features and have direct access to the D-STAR network with Terminal/Access point modes. The Photo Share feature as seen in the IC-9700 is available on the IC-705 to share photos with other IC-705 and IC-9700 radios without a computer.
    - Icom ID-800H: 2 m / 70 cm dual band digital voice mobile transceiver. Power up to 55 W on 2 m and 50 W on 70 cm.
    - Icom ID-880H: 3rd gen 2 m / 70 cm digital voice mobile transceiver (50W).
    - Icom IC-80AD: 3rd gen 2m / 70 cm digital voice hand held transceiver (5W).
    - Icom IC-92AD: 2 m / 70 cm twin band digital voice hand held transceiver. Four power settings up to 5 W on each band. Rugged and submersible design, optional microphone with embedded GPS.
    - Icom IC-91AD/IC-E91 + D-STAR: 2 m / 70 cm twin band digital voice hand held transceiver. Power is selectable at 0.5 W or 5 W on each band.
    - Icom IC-905: VHF/UHF/SHF transceiver announced recently by ICOM.
    - Icom IC-2200H: 2 m single band digital voice mobile transceiver. Power up to 65 W. Must purchase optional D-STAR module.
    - Icom IC-V82: 2 m single band digital voice hand held transceiver. Power up to 7 W. Must purchase optional D-STAR module.
    - Icom IC-U82: 70 cm single band digital voice hand held transceiver. Power up to 5 W. Must purchase optional D-STAR module.
    - Icom IC-9100: HF/VHF/UHF transceiver. Must purchase optional UT-121 D-STAR module.
    - Icom IC-9700: 2 m / 70 cm / 23 cm All Mode. Includes the Digital Data Mode found in the discontinued ID-1. Can decode two digital voice streams at once.
    - Icom IC-7100: HF/VHF/UHF transceiver. Includes built-in D-STAR capability and monochrome touchscreen.
    - Icom ID-4100A: 2 m / 70 cm twin band digital voice mobile transceiver with monochrome touchscreen. Power up to 50 W. Air band, Marine, Weather RX. Terminal and assess point mode GPS receiver. microSD slot for voice and logging
    - Icom ID-5100: 2 m / 70 cm twin band digital voice mobile transceiver with monochrome touchscreen. Power up to 50 W on each band. Includes D-STAR module standard with GPS receiver and antenna in the head. Higher speed (3600 bit/s) DV data mode possible with firmware upgrade.
  - Receivers:
    - Icom IC-R2500: HF/VHF/UHF/SHF receiver/scanner. Must purchase optional D-STAR module.
    - Icom IC-R30: HF/VHF/UHF/SHF receiver/scanner
  - Repeater equipment:

ICOM released their third generation DSTAR Repeaters, which now do not require a separate repeater controller as the controller is now built into each repeater. Plus the new repeaters can operate as DSTAR only, FM only or Mixed Mode where the repeater can do either mode. However, they will only do one mode at a time DSTAR to DSTAR or FM to FM, they do not do cross mode DSTAR to FM for example. Also DSTAR has priority over FM stopping FM users for at least five seconds prior to passing their transmission.

    - Icom ID-RP2010V: 2 m digital voice repeater.
    - Icom ID-RP4010V: 70 cm digital voice repeater.
    - Icom ID-RP1200VD: 23 cm digital voice repeater.

The older ICOM repeaters below are now EOL (End Of Life) with ICOM withdrawing any support for them. Once they stop working, there is no repair available. This is making the Icom ID-RP2C: Repeater controller in particular a commodity on the secondhand market.

    - Icom ID-RP2000V: 2 m digital voice repeater.
    - Icom ID-RP4000V: 70 cm digital voice repeater.
    - Icom ID-RP2V: 23 cm digital voice repeater.
    - Icom ID-RP2D: 23 cm digital data access point.
    - Icom ID-RP2C: Repeater controller. Can support up to four digital voice repeaters and digital data access points. Required to operate any Icom D-STAR digital voice repeater or digital data access point.
    - Icom ID-RP2L: 10 GHz Microwave Link Repeater.
- FlexRadio Systems D-STAR equipment
  - Transceivers—D-STAR, CODEC2, Analog FM Capable and all mode:
    - FLEX-6700: HF-2m all mode including digital voice transceiver (8 receivers). Power is selectable from 1 W to 100 W. Open API including D-STAR access. D-STAR source available online
    - FLEX-6500: HF-4m all mode including digital voice transceiver (4 receivers). Power is selectable from 1 W to 100 W. Open API including D-STAR access. D-STAR source available online
    - FLEX-6300: HF-6m all mode including digital voice transceiver (2 receivers). Power is selectable from 1 W to 100 W. Open API including D-STAR access. D-STAR source available online
  - Receivers:
    - FLEX-6700R: HF-2m all mode including digital voice receiver (8 receivers). Open API including D-STAR access. D-STAR source available online

Note: These transceivers are not available in North America and appear to be OEM versions of the Icom ID-800H

- Kenwood D-STAR equipment
  - Transceivers:
    - Kenwood TH-D74: 2 m / 70 cm dual band handheld with digital voice and APRS.
    - Kenwood TH-D74A: 2 m / 1.25 m / 70 cm tri band handheld with digital voice and APRS.
    - Kenwood TH-D74E: 2 m / 70 cm dual band handheld with digital voice and APRS.
    - Kenwood TH-D75: 2 m / 70 cm dual band handheld with digital voice and APRS.
    - Kenwood TH-D75A: 2 m / 1.25 m / 70 cm tri band handheld with digital voice and APRS.
    - Kenwood TH-D75E: 2 m / 70 cm dual band handheld with digital voice and APRS.
    - Kenwood TM-D750: 2 m / 70 cm dual band mobile radio with digital voice and APRS.
    - Kenwood TM-D750A: 2 m / 1.25 m / 70 cm tri band mobile radio with digital voice and APRS.
    - Kenwood TM-D750E: 2 m / 70 cm dual band mobile radio with digital voice and APRS.
    - Kenwood TMW-706: 2 m / 70 cm dual band digital voice mobile transceiver. Power up to 20 W.
    - Kenwood TMW-706S: 2 m / 70 cm dual band digital voice mobile transceiver. Power up to 50 W.
- AOR
  - Receivers:
    - AOR AR-DV1: Wide band receiver (100 kHz - 1300 MHz) that decodes multiple digital voice modes including D-STAR
    - AOR AR-DV10: Wide band receiver (100 kHz - 1300 MHz) that decodes multiple digital voice modes including D-STAR
- Inet Labs
  - Computer accessory:
    - DV-Dongle: The dongle is a USB device with the AMBE codec built in. Amateurs can use this with a personal computer's audio system to communicate over the D-STAR network. This is an option for using D-STAR if there is not a local D-STAR repeater or if there is a repeater but it is not associated with an Internet gateway. The dongle works along with the DVTOOL software, a simple application that mimics the controls on a D-STAR radio, although the interface does not actually look like a radio panel. Note: Now available from a number of amateur radio dealers or by homebrew using documentation at Moetronix.
    - DV-AP: A DVAP Dongle (DV Access Point Dongle) is also a USB device that creates a connection to the D-STAR network through an Internet connected computer. But instead of using the computer's audio system, the DVAP Dongle has an antenna and a 10 mW two-meter transceiver that provides short-range over-the-air access using a D-STAR radio (usually a handheld). Note that a D-STAR radio is required. The DVAP does not convert an analog FM signal to D-STAR.
- NW Digital Radio
  - Computer accessory:
    - ThumbDV D-STAR DV USB is a USB device with the AMBE codec built in. Amateurs can use this with a personal computer's audio system to communicate over the D-STAR network. This is an option for using D-STAR if there is not a local D-STAR repeater with a gateway.
    - PiDV D-STAR DV add-on card for upcoming UDRX, Odroid or Raspberry Pi that adds the AMBE codec chip

Manufacturers of D-STAR equipment
Manufacturer	Radio(s)	Repeater(s)	More Information
AOR	AR-DV1 and AR-DV10 Receiver	No	Wide band receiver (100 kHz - 1300 MHz) capable of decoding multiple digital voice modes
DV-RPTR	Node adapter & Hotspot	Yes	Open Source hardware and firmware. Can be used for simplex node or repeater.
DVMEGA	Dualband Radio Hotspot & GMSK Node Adaptor	Yes	Hotspot and GMSK Node Adaptors give D-STAR users access to the reflector network.
FlexRadio Systems	Yes	No	(FLEX-6700, FLEX-6500, FLEX-6300, FLEX-6700R)
Icom	Yes	Yes	(ID-1, ID-800H, ID-880H, IC-2200H, IC-2820H, IC-705, IC-80D, IC-91AD, IC-92AD, ID-RP2000V, ID-RP4000V, ID-31A, ID-51A, ID-52, IC-7100, IC-9100, IC-9700, ID-5100A)
Kenwood	Yes	Yes	(TH-D74, TH-D75)
MicroWalt Corporation DUTCH*Star	Mini Hotspot & Node Adaptor	Yes	Hotspot / Node Adaptors give D-STAR users access to remote D-STAR systems using over-the-air interface. Can be used as a simplex node or repeater.
Moetronix	DV Dongle & DVAP	No	(Available through multiple amateur radio dealers.)
NW Digital Radio "nwdigitalradio.com"	ThumbDV and PiDV AMBE decoders. UDRC and UDRC II (Universal Digital Radio Controller) which adds D-STAR to the Yaesu DR-1X repeater or homebrew hotspots and repeaters	No	ThumbDV D-STAR DV USB (AMBE decoder in thumb drive) and D-STAR DV add on card for Raspberry Pi. UDRC and UDRC II Raspberry Pi hat sound card and controller for digital radio repeaters and hotspots.
UP4DAR	Node adapter & Hotspot	Yes	Open Source hardware and firmware. Can be used for IP-reflector, dongle, modem or hotspot.

== See also ==
- MDC-1200
- Multi-Band Excitation
- NXDN, a related commercial two-way digital radio standard with similar characteristics
- Project 25, a related digital radio standard sponsored by APCO
- Ricochet modems
- TETRA, a digital two-way radio standard in use outside of North America

== Journal ==
- ARRL: QST Icom IC 2820H Dual Band FM Transceiver Vol 91 No 11 November 2007 Page 74, by Steve Ford, WB8IMY does a review on the IC 2820H Dual Band FM Transceiver.
- RSGB: RadCom March 2008 (Vol 83 No 03) review of Icom IC-E2820 transceiver and overview of D-STAR.
- CQ-VHF: D-STAR in the Southeastern U.S., Greg Sarratt, W4OZK, (partial), https://web.archive.org/web/20080913225308/http://www.cq-vhf.com/D-StarWin08.html
- N1IC's Review of Icom ID-51 http://nicktoday.com/icom-id-51-id-51a-first-quick-review/
