= Internet Radio Linking Project =

Amateur radio VoIP technology

The Internet Radio Linking Project, also called IRLP links amateur radio stations around the world by using Voice over IP (VoIP). Each gateway consists of a dedicated computer running custom software that is connected to both a radio and the Internet. This arrangement forms what is known as an IRLP Node. Since all end users communicate using a radio as opposed to using a computer directly, IRLP has adopted the motto "Keeping the Radio in Amateur Radio".

Amateur radio operators (hams) within radio range of a local node are able to use DTMF tone generators to initiate a node-to-node connection with any other available node in the world. Each node has a unique 4 digit node number in the range of 1000–8999. A real-time searchable list of all nodes worldwide (including their current status) is available anytime by viewing the IRLP Network at a Glance. As of February 2019, there are over 1,500 active nodes.

IRLP connections are of two types: node to node, and node to reflector. Stations wishing to communicate with 3 or more nodes at the same time may accomplish this by connecting to what is called an IRLP Reflector. Reflectors are a type of conferencing system. Most reflectors on the network have 10 channels (0–9) with channel 0 being the main channel. Each reflector has a unique 4 digit node number in the range of 9000–9999. The first 3 digits consist of the reflector number, while the fourth digit represents the channel number. As of April 2007, there are 20 operational reflectors (including Echo Reflector 9990, which digitally records and plays back transmissions for testing purposes). Since most reflectors have 10 channels, there are approximately 200 unique reflector channels available for use.

== History ==
IRLP was invented by David "Dave" Cameron, VE7LTD. Born and raised in West Vancouver, British Columbia, Canada, Cameron attended the University of British Columbia where he joined the UBC Amateur Radio Society. He built his first repeater and computer-based repeater controller in the 1990s.

Cameron installed the first three IRLP nodes in November 1997. They used the Windows operating system (OS) with VocalTec's iPhone installed. There were problems with the software, mainly in the fact that iPhone is not very stable nor is it controllable. After running iPhone for close to 6 months on active connections to Vernon, British Columbia, Canada and Saint John, New Brunswick, Canada, Cameron decided to rebuild the nodes and essentially start over. This is when the Linux OS and the Speak Freely software were first tested.

On November 12, 1998, the VE7RHS node was first installed in Gage Towers, UBC, Vancouver, British Columbia, Canada using Linux. A few days later, the VE7RVN node came online from the residence of Michael Paul Illingby, VE7TFD in Vernon, British Columbia, Canada. Since this point, no further problems were experienced. This planted the seed for the IRLP network to grow. New nodes slowly launched across Canada, followed by the United States and worldwide.

Node numbers were originally set at 3 digits in length. Due to the extensive growth of the IRLP network, an extra digit needed to be added in 2002. Existing node numbers after this change received a trailing zero. For example, if the old node number was 123, it became 1230. Most existing reflectors were also converted from a single channel to 10 channels. This new type of reflector was known as a super-reflector. After all the reflectors were converted the "super-" was dropped.

== Requirements ==
=== Computer ===
- A dedicated IBM compatible computer, Pentium class (Intel, AMD etc.), running a processor clocked at least 200 MHz
- At least 128 MB of RAM
- A dedicated hard drive of at least 2 GB
- Basic (legacy) parallel port running LPT1 (0x378/9)
- Soundcard – most PCI cards work as do many motherboard based chipsets
- Ethernet Adapter (Network Card) connected to the Internet

=== Operating system ===
Linux is the operating system (OS) of choice for IRLP, as it allows the best in reliability, programmability, efficiency, and functionality. Some older IRLP nodes use the Red Hat 7.3 or Red Hat 9 distribution, as they were very stable releases and ran very smoothly on any Pentium or better computer. In 2005, a custom version of Fedora Core 3 was introduced, followed by Fedora Core 5 in 2006. As of March 2007, IRLP no longer supports Red Hat and started shipping with the CentOS 4 distribution. As of December 2012, IRLP has released a final version of CentOS 4.9, but now supports Debian as its operating system of choice. This release provides greatly improved operation with more support for varying hardware.

=== IRLP hardware ===
An IRLP board is required to interface to the radio. Currently version 3.0 IRLP boards are available fully assembled and tested. Each board comes complete with all the cables between the board and computer parallel port (with sub-hoods) and terminates in a male DE-9 connector for interface into the radio. A cable terminated in a female DE-9 plugs into the IRLP board and interfaces to a radio/repeater/controller. Two mono or stereo 1/8" audio plugs connect to the computer's sound card. The audio circuitry is the owner's responsibility.

The IRLP board is a very simple circuit, the most difficult part being the DTMF decoder which consists of a MT8870 (or similar) DTMF decoder IC and HCF4081 (or similar) and-gate IC. Two chips are needed because the MT8870 has latched outputs, and the IRLP software looks for short pulses at the parallel port pins 10,12,13,15 in order to acknowledge a DTMF digit. MT8870 pin 15 provides a pulse when any valid DTMF digit is decoded, so this signal is used on one input of each gate on the HCF4081. The other gate input is from MT8870 pins 11,12,13,14. The output of the HCF4081 (pins 3,4,10,11) connect to the parallel port and provide the pulsed input that IRLP needs.

The IRLP software cannot decode the D digit (the bottom right key on a 16-button DTMF dial). This is a limitation of the hardware in the decoder. DTMF digit D is logic level 0 on all 4 bits from the MT8870. Thus, the parallel port pins would all be at 0 volts, which IRLP regards as no DTMF digit present. The IRLP board does not pass the MT8870's strobe pin to the PC, if it did that would enable digit D detection.

The IRLP board has no audio transformers or bypass capacitors. It is merely a DTMF decoder circuit with a simple COS and PTT circuit installed. Version 3 boards also have simple FET switches for the AUX 1,2 and 3 functions.

== Parallel port pin assignments ==
 
 3  PTT
 4  Aux pin 1 (active high at parallel port)
 5  Aux pin 2 (active high at parallel port)
 6  Aux pin 3 (active high at parallel port)
10  DTMF 4
11  COS (active low at parallel port on squelch open)
12  DTMF 3
13  DTMF 2
15  DTMF 1
25  Ground

(Also ground DB25 shell)

=== RF hardware ===
A link radio or repeater is needed to interface to the IRLP board. The radio's COS (carrier operated squelch) and PTT lines must be available to the IRLP board. Additionally, courtesy tones, hang time, and node IDs must not be transmitted over the VoIP link. This can easily be accomplished using CTCSS on the repeater transmitter that follows the COS of the receiver.

== See also ==
- EchoLink
- eQSO
- Wide-coverage Internet Repeater Enhancement System
- Radio over IP
- Free Radio Network (NL)
- Free Radio Network (DE)
