= EchoLink =

Amateur radio VoIP technology

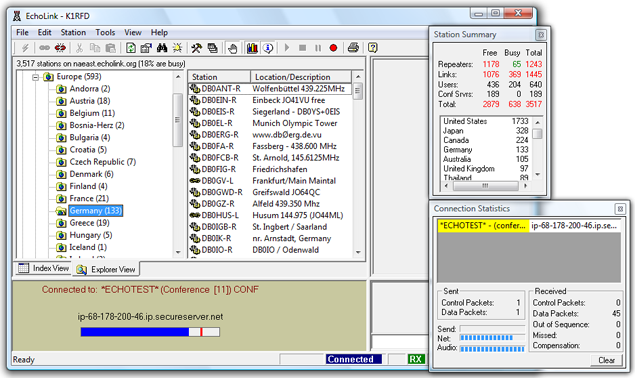
EchoLink working on Windows Vista.

EchoLink is a computer-based amateur radio system distributed free of charge that allows radio amateurs to communicate with other amateur radio operators using Voice over IP (VoIP) technology on the Internet for at least part of the path between them. It was designed by Jonathan Taylor, a radio amateur with call sign K1RFD. Taylor has been the system engineer and administrator since 2002.

The system allows reliable worldwide connections to be made between radio amateurs, greatly enhancing amateur radio's communications capabilities. In essence it is the same as other VoIP applications (such as Skype), but with the unique addition of the ability to link to an amateur radio station's transceiver. Thus any low-power handheld amateur radio transceiver which can contact a local EchoLink node (a node is an active EchoLink station with a transceiver attached) can then use the Internet connection of that station to send its transmission via VoIP to any other active EchoLink node, worldwide. No special hardware or software is required to relay a transmission via an EchoLink node.

Before using the system, it is necessary for a prospective user's callsign to be validated. The EchoLink system requires that each new user provide positive proof of license and identity before their callsign is added to the list of validated users. There is no cost for this service, and it ensures that this system is used only by licensed amateur radio operators.

The software is written to run on 32-bit and 64-bit versions of Microsoft Windows. Another edition of the software runs on Apple mobile devices (iPhone, iPod touch, and iPad), and is available from the Apple App Store. Qtel is an opensource version of the software available in many Linux repositories. An Android version is available on Google Play and several other Android app repositories. In late 2023, EchoLink released a cross-platform Web browser based edition (EchoLink Web), which runs entirely within a Web browser.

== Uses ==
Radio amateurs using the EchoLink software can operate it in one of two modes:

- Single User Mode. If they have an Internet-connected computer, they can use the computer's microphone and speakers to connect to (or through - see below) other EchoLink-enabled computers over the Internet and talk to the amateur at the other end.
- Sysop Mode. This entails connecting their own VHF or UHF transceiver to their Internet-connected PC with a simple homemade or manufactured radio-PC digital mode interface. Doing this enables another radio amateur with their own transceiver, who is within radio range of this station, to communicate with (or through) any other EchoLink-equipped station anywhere in the world. This is the unique feature of EchoLink.

Radio amateurs without the EchoLink software or a computer connected to the Internet can take advantage of the EchoLink network if they are within radio range of a sysop mode EchoLink station. It is also possible to link a sysop mode EchoLink station to a local repeater, further enhancing the communication possibilities.

== Smartphone editions ==
Editions of EchoLink are also available for two of the major smartphone platforms. In February 2010, an edition of EchoLink was released for the Apple iPhone, iPad, and iPod Touch on the App Store. In August 2010, an edition of EchoLink was released for the Android platform, and is now available in the Google Play Store. Both the iOS and Android editions were created by Jonathan Taylor (K1RFD), the author of the original Windows edition.

== EchoLink-compatible software for other operating systems ==
Open source software packages that are largely compatible with EchoLink are available for Macintosh (EchoMac and EchoHam) and Linux (echoLinux or SvxLink/Qtel).

SvxLink Server is an alternative implementation for Linux. It only implements sysop mode.

EchoIRLP is a software add on for IRLP which enables an IRLP node to operate as a sysop mode EchoLink station.

Amateurs running the app_rpt extension for Asterisk can also enable EchoLink functionality by loading an EchoLink channel driver. This option is included in packages such as hamvoip that run on the AllStarLink network. In fact, the majority of EchoLink Sysop nodes which have just come online recently are running this software stack.

EchoLink conference servers, which have designated names rather than callsigns, generally run on an open-source software package called theBridge.

The EchoLink software, which is designed to run on Microsoft Windows, has also been known to work on several Linux builds as well if loaded through Wine.

== See also ==
- Free Radio Network (NL)
- Free Radio Network (DE)
- Internet Radio Linking Project
- HamSphere
- Wide-coverage Internet Repeater Enhancement System
