= Amateur radio operating award =

Award

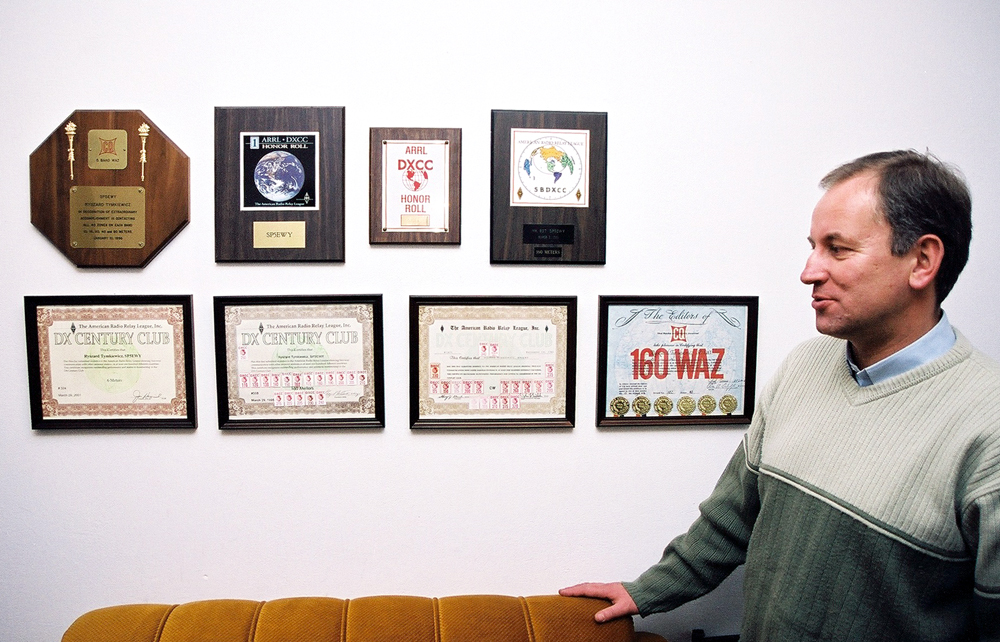
The most coveted Amateur Radio operating awards

An amateur radio operating award is earned by an amateur radio operator for establishing two-way communication (or "working") with other amateur radio stations. Awards are sponsored by national amateur radio societies, radio enthusiast magazines, or amateur radio clubs, and aim to promote activity on the amateur radio bands. Each award has its own set of rules and fees.

Some awards require the amateur radio operator to have contacted other stations in a certain number of countries, Maidenhead grid locators, or counties. Because amateur radio operators are forbidden by regulation to accept financial compensation for their on-air activity, award recipients generally only receive a certificate, wooden plaque, or a small trophy as recognition of their award. Some awards require fees to be paid, to cover processing and verification as well as hosting and system hardware charges, plus shipping, while others are free. In some instances certificates may be digital documents.

Many amateur radio operating awards require that the applicant submit proof, such as QSL cards, of the contacts which satisfy the requirements of the award. Digital cross-checked logs using online digitally-signed verification systems such as Logbook of the World also satisfy some awards’ requirements.

Many other awards are based on trust, with little or no verification that “QSOs” (contacts) submitted for consideration are genuine.

There are thousands of operating awards available. The most popular awards are the Worked All States award, the Worked All Continents award, and the more challenging Worked All Zones, DX Century Club (DXCC), Islands on the Air (IOTA) and VHF/UHF Century Club (VUCC) awards.

DXCC is the most popular awards program, initially requiring amateurs to contact 100 of the 340 (as of 2025) separately designated countries and territories ("entities") in the world. (DXing is the practice of contacting distant parties.)

Other popular awards include contacting remote islands (Islands on the Air, also known as “IOTA”), beaches, US counties, lighthouses, parks and forests. Each of these locations may have a unique designation for their specific award, which operators log and then submit for award accreditation.

Many awards are available for contacting amateurs in a particular country, region, city or topographical feature. For example, Summits On The Air (SOTA) tallies points towards awards to operators who transmit from mountain elevations or make contact with those transmitting from them, for which events are scheduled periodically.

Some countries may be split into collectible areas for awards based on county (e.g., USA, UK), province (Netherlands and Belgium, or in France, departments), canton (Switzerland), or other territorial area.

In the United Kingdom, the Worked All Britain (WAB) award uses WAB squares based on the UK Ordnance Survey mapping system, dividing the UK, Crown Dependencies and Republic of Ireland into squares to be contacted for credit.

Some awards are popular enough that “contests” (scheduled recurring designated dates and times of operation) take place where ham radio operators try to activate or contact as many locations and swap designations based on the rules as possible in the timeframe. This harmonizes activity for a specific purpose, such as activation of DXCC entities, island groups, Maidenhead Grid squares, zones or other award identifier, as per the rules of each contest organising body.

Awards may have tiers, for example, confirming 100 DXCC entities, then in stepped tiers until a “full house” is reached. This often becomes a lifelong challenge, which may be frustrated by national restrictions or geopolitics, such as North Korea and Turkmenistan’s prohibition on amateur radio operation, or safety concerns such as islands in the South China Sea such as Pratas Island, Scarborough Reef and Spratly Islands.

== Special event stations ==
Many amateurs also enjoy setting up and contacting special event stations. Set up to commemorate special occurrences, they often issue distinctive QSLs or certificates. Some use unusual prefixes, such as the call signs with "96" that amateurs in the US State of Georgia could use during the 1996 Atlanta Olympics, or the OO prefix used by Belgian amateurs in 2005 to commemorate their nation's 175th anniversary. (Not surprisingly, there are also awards for working sufficient numbers of prefixes.) Some events are held annually such as Guides on the Air and Jamboree on the Air. Many amateurs decorate their radio "shacks" (the room where they keep their radios) with these certificates.

== See also ==
- Parks On The Air
- Summits On The Air
