= Len Jarrett =

British-Canadian scouting leader (1921–2017)

Leonard F. Jarrett

Director of Administration of the World Scout Bureau
- In office 1955–1981

Personal details
- Born: Leonard Frank Jarrett; 31 March 1921 Croydon, Surrey
- Died: 15 December 2017 (aged 96) Ontario, Canada

Leonard Frank Jarrett (31 March 1921 – 15 December 2017) was a British-Canadian who served as Director of Administration of the World Scout Bureau in London, Ottawa, and Geneva, from 1955–81, and as a consultant for the World Scout Bureau from 1981–86. Jarrett was the World Organizer of Jamboree on the Air (JOTA) for 30 years, from 1958–88.

In 1973, Jarrett was awarded the Bronze Wolf, the only award bestowed by the World Organization of the Scout Movement, by the World Scout Committee at the 24th World Scout Conference in Nairobi, Kenya, in recognition of outstanding service to the World Scout Movement.

In 1983, The Scout Association awarded Jarrett the Silver Acorn, in recognition of specially distinguished service, at the 29th World Scout Conference in Dearborn, Michigan. At the same conference, he was presented with the Silver World Award by the Boy Scouts of America, for noteworthy and extraordinary service to youth on an international basis.

Jarrett wrote a history of the Jamboree on the Air, entitled "The JOTA Story, 35 years of Scouting's Worldwide Jamboree-on-the-Air", from its inception in 1958 until 1993. Jarrett co-authored, along with the founder of JOTA, and the current JOTA World Organizer, a history of the first 50 years of the Jamboree on the Air, entitled "CQ Jamboree, 50 years of Scouting's Jamboree- on-the-Air".

== Books published ==
- Len Jarrett, The JOTA Story, 35 years of Scouting's Worldwide Jamboree-on-the-Air, World Scout Bureau, 1994
- Len Jarrett, Les Mitchell, and Richard Middelkoop CQ Jamboree, 50 years of Scouting's Jamboree-on-the-Air, World Scout Bureau, February 2008
