= Summits On The Air =

Amateur radio operating award program

- Abbreviation: SOTA
- Formation: March 2, 2002; 24 years ago
- Purpose: Radiosport
- President: John Linford, G3WGV
- Website: www.sota.org.uk

Summits On The Air (SOTA) is an amateur radio operating award program launched in Great Britain in 2002 by John Linford.

The aim of SOTA is to encourage licensed amateur radio operators to operate temporarily from mountainous locations using any method of travel including hiking, mountain climbing, and cycling while operating their amateur radio station from the summits of hills and mountains. In addition to getting operators out into the field the program encourages others to listen in to the transmissions from these stations and make a two-way radio contact with the SOTA station. An activator must achieve at least 4 two-way contacts to achieve a successful activation, using any amateur radio band or mode. An activator may use multiple modes and/or bands on an activation to achieve this. In areas that are not remote or difficult to access some SOTA activations serve as community outreach events.

The program now has over 33,842 participants world wide, with about 7,000 in the United States. Amateur radio operators who set up stations on mountain peaks are known as activators, and other amateur radio operators who complete contacts with them are called chasers. Points are given to both activators and chasers based on the height of the summit. A seasonal bonus may be made available to reflect the increased difficulty of activations of certain summits in the bonus period, such as higher summits in winter.

Awards are given based on accumulated points and certain special criteria. Amateur radio contacts between summits, referred to as summit-to-summit, are considered special achievements.

Operators make use of a wide array of communication methods including morse code, voice (FM or SSB), and digital modes such as FT8. Although all parts of the amateur radio bands can be used to make contacts, setups and communication modes vary across operators based on equipment, environment and license class.

Operators use both VHF and HF signals to make contacts, in both cases enjoying improved line-of-sight propagation over obstructions that would otherwise block transmissions. Contacts are also made using amateur radio satellites.

The highest ever Summits on the Air activation reported was in February 2019 by Polish amateur radio operator Tom Rudzinski (SQ9FVE), who successfully operated from 6,962 meters (22,841 feet) above sea level, atop Aconcagua in Mendoza, Argentina.

== Gallery ==
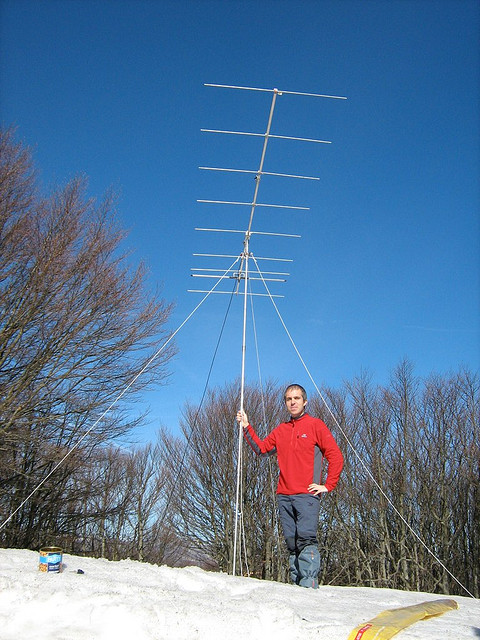
Activating Monte Zuccone in Italy on 2-meter band

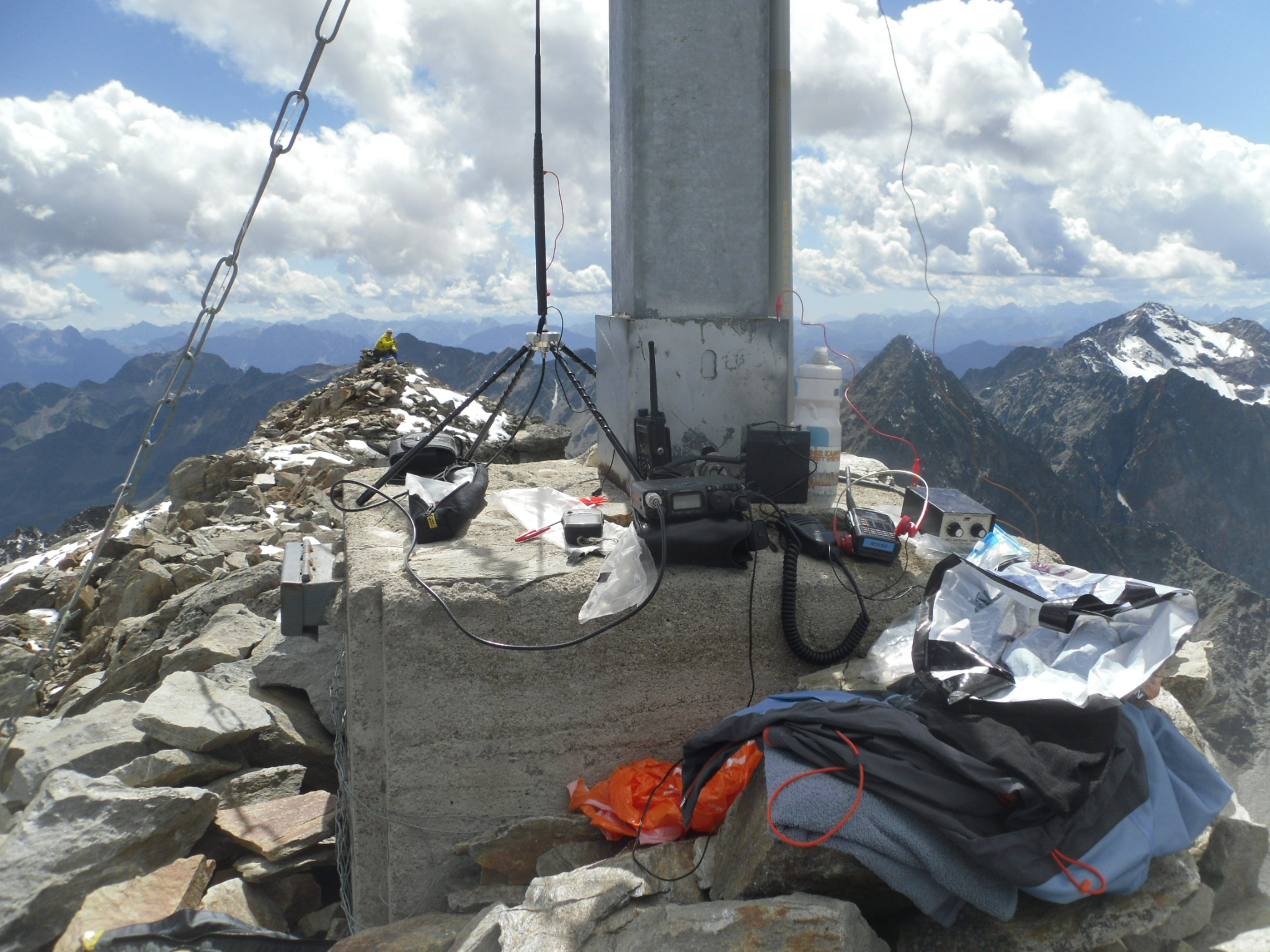
Activation of Roter Knopf on Shortwave, VHF and UHF

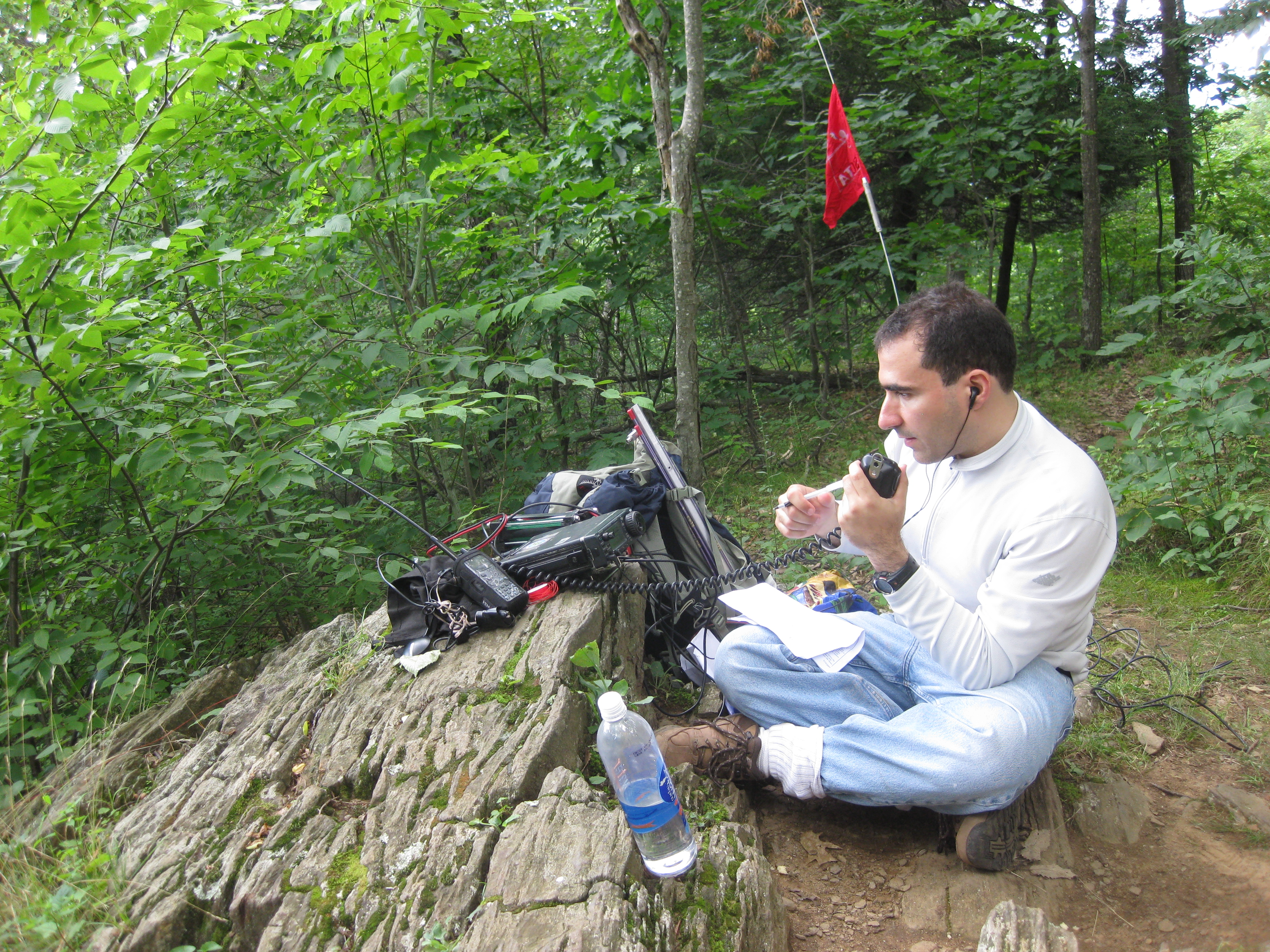
Activating Tenmile Hill in Connecticut on HF

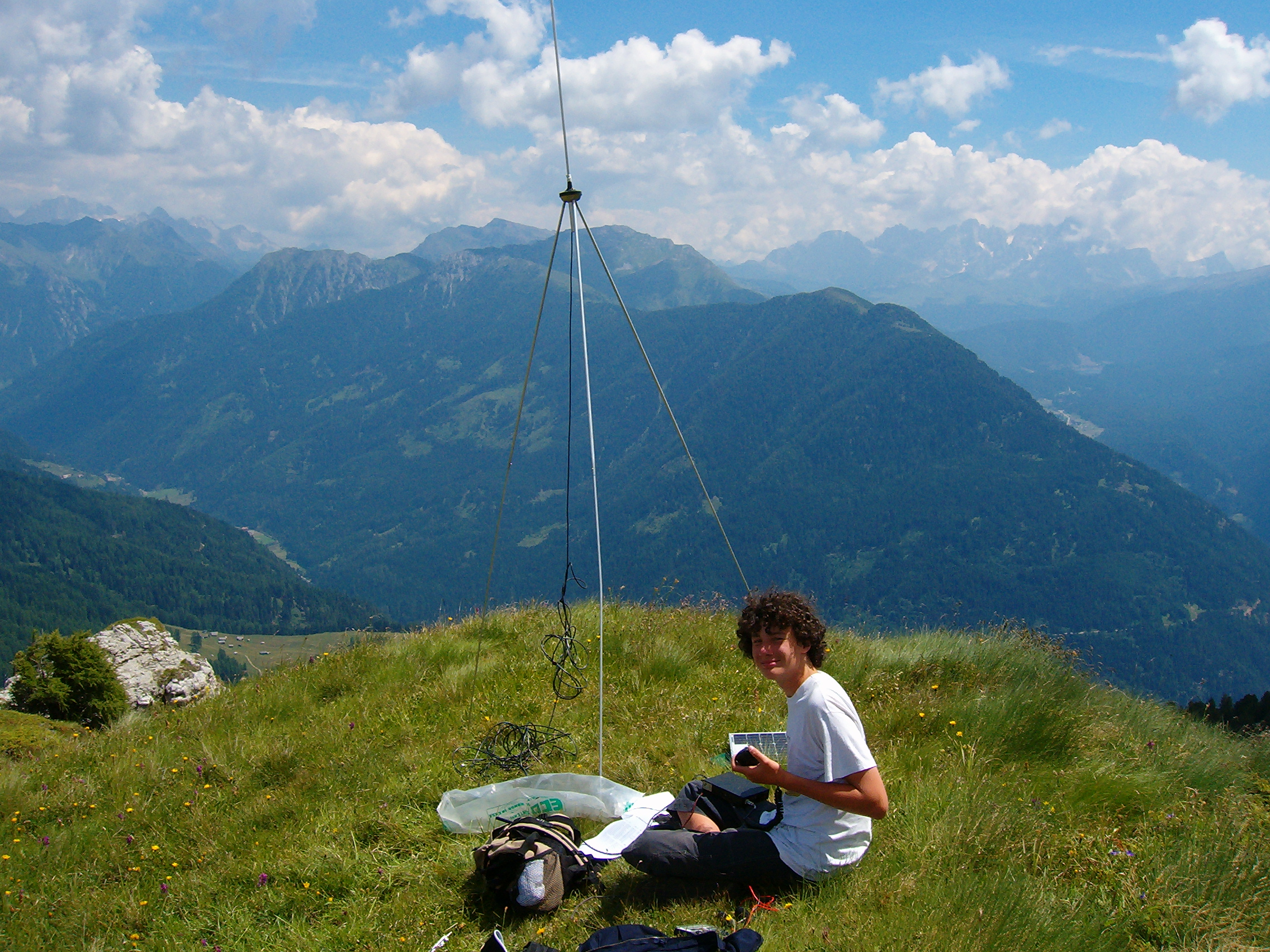
Activating in Italy on HF

== See also ==
- Parks On The Air
- Beaches On The Air
