= Rosemary Mitchell =

British academic (1967–2021)

Rosemary Ann Mitchell (9 June 1967 – 20 September 2021) was a British historian. A Victorianist, she was Professor of Victorian Studies at Leeds Trinity University and, following retirement from this role, an ordained Anglican deacon.

== Early life ==
Mitchell was born in Poole, Dorset, on 9 June 1967, the only child of Leslie Mitchell (the founder of the Jamboree on the Air) and his wife Eileen (née Hawkins). She was educated at Brigidine School, Windsor and then at Padworth College. She read history at Lincoln College, Oxford (BA, 1988), remaining there to undertake a Diploma in the History of Art and a DPhil (1991).

== Academic career ==
From 1993 Mitchell was a research editor for the Victorian sections of the Oxford Dictionary of National Biography. She joined the staff of Leeds Trinity University in 1999, subsequently becoming Professor of Victorian Studies in 2018. She was also the director of the Leeds Victorian Studies Centre. She retired from Leeds Trinity University in 2019. She was a member of the editorial board of the Journal of Victorian Culture. Her scholarship was noted for its interdisciplinarity.

== Works ==
- Picturing the Past: English History in Text and Image, 1830-1870 (2000: OUP).
- Mutual (In)Comprehensions: France and Britain in the Long Nineteenth Century (2013: Cambridge Scholars Publishing).
- Holding Up Half the Sky (with Hannah Stone) (2019: Indigo Dreams Publishing).

== Ordination ==
Mitchell trained for ordination at St Hild College in Mirfield, and was ordained deacon at Ripon Cathedral in 2021. She was appointed to serve her title at Holy Trinity Church, Skipton.

== Personal life ==
Mitchell died in 2021, aged 54, from cancer.
