= Leslie R. Mitchell =

Scouter and a radio amateur, founder of Jamboree-on-the-Air (1923 – 2014)

- Les Mitchell operating his radio.
- Born: 9 December 1923; Hammersmith, England
- Died: 6 October 2014 (aged 90); Bingley, West Yorkshire, England
- Other names: Known as G3BHK on the air
- Occupation: Civil servant
- Known for: Founder Jamboree on the Air
- Notable work: CQ Jamboree, 50 years of Scouting's Jamboree-on-the-Air

Leslie R. Mitchell (Hammersmith, England 9 December 1923 – 6 October 2014 Bingley, West Yorkshire, England), a Scouter and a radio amateur with the callsign G3BHK, was the founder of Jamboree-on-the-Air (JOTA), now considered the largest event scheduled by the World Organization of the Scout Movement annually.

== Personal life ==
Mitchell was born in Hammersmith, the son and only child of Horace Richard Mitchell, a civil servant, and his wife Amy Lily Staple. In his youth, his father's job - managing labour exchanges - meant that he was moved round the country, with the family eventually settling in Reading, where Mitchell joined the Sea Scouts. He joined the Royal Navy during WWII, serving as a Navy radio mechanic posted in the United States and Australia; in both of these postings he volunteered as a Scout leader. where he remained active in Scouting. Upon returning to England at the end of World War II, he used the radio skills learned during the war to apply for an amateur transmitting licence. In 1961, he married Eileen Phillippa Hawkins, the daughter of a Welsh-born doctor; their only child, daughter Rosemary, was born in 1967. Mitchell's Scouting work was voluntary; after the War, he had joined the civil service, and he worked for many years at government science research facilities at Winfrith in Dorset and Datchet in Berkshire, managing transport arrangements.

== Birth of JOTA ==
Mitchell tried for several years after the war to interest Scouts in amateur radio, without success until the 9th World Scout Jamboree at Sutton Park in 1957, when the first amateur radio station was established in the Jamboree area, under the call sign GB3SP. The Jamboree radio station was run by local radio amateurs, but Scouts and leaders attending the camp were only permitted to observe. Mitchell was surprised at the number of Scout radio operators from around the world that he met there and they had several meetings near the radio station during the event. At the end of the Jamboree, they all agreed to contact each other on a specific day, which Mitchell agreed to arrange. Subsequently, Mitchell decided to expand that meeting day to a weekend, and invite other radio operators with an interest in Scouting to open their stations to local Scouts so that they could participate. As an experiment in October 1957, Mitchell set up a 40 Watt AM transmitter in a tent outside his Scout Group's hall in Reading; the Scouts were able to make contacts all over the world, proving that the idea was viable. Having gained the necessary permission from the radio licensing authority and The Scout Association and having drawn up a set of simple rules which are still in use today, the first Jamboree-on-the-Air followed in May 1958, and thereafter annually in October. Mitchell quickly gained the support of the World Scout Bureau for the event.

== Mitchell and the development of JOTA ==
As JOTA grew year-on-year, Mitchell was gratified by the increasing number of qualified operators within the Scout Movement. In 1975, Mitchell gave the opening address at the first Radio Scouting Conference in Lillehammer, Norway, during the 14th World Scout Jamboree. In 1978, Mitchell was awarded the 132nd Bronze Wolf Award, the only distinction given by the World Organization of the Scout Movement, awarded for an individual's exceptional services to world Scouting over many years. The 40th JOTA in 1997 celebrated its anniversary by operating the World Scout Organization call-sign from the 79th Reading Scout HQ in Reading where the first JOTA was held, with Mitchell on transmitting along with other veterans of the first JOTA. In later life, Mitchell became a keen family historian and a popular speaker at local and family history societies. He continued to participate in JOTA, either in person at a station or on the air, until within a few years of his death.

Mitchell died shortly before JOTA 2014 and during the event at 12:00 UTC on 18 October, a one minute silence was observed by the participants of both JOTA and Jamboree on the Internet (JOTI) which runs in tandem with JOTA; the participation in both events in 2014 was officially stated to be 1,332,265 Scouts and Guides from 157 countries. Mitchell's funeral was held at St Peter's Parish Church, Rawdon near Leeds on 20 October; amongst the Scouters present was Richard Middelkoop, the advisor on Radio Scouting to the World Organization of the Scout Movement, who had flown in from Geneva.

== Books published ==
- Len Jarrett, Les Mitchell, and Richard Middelkoop, February 2008, CQ Jamboree, 50 years of Scouting's Jamboree-on-the-Air, World Scout Bureau, ISBN 978-90-812601-1-4
