= International reply coupon =

Coupon exchangeable for postage stamps

An international reply coupon (IRC) is a coupon that can be exchanged for one or more postage stamps representing the minimum postage for an unregistered priority airmail letter sent to another Universal Postal Union (UPU) member country. IRCs are accepted by all UPU member countries. UPU number: CN01.

UPU member postal services are obliged to exchange an IRC for postage, but are not obliged to sell them.

The purpose of the IRC is to allow a person to send someone in another country a letter, along with the cost of postage for a reply. If the addressee is within the same country, there is no need for an IRC because a self-addressed stamped envelope (SASE) or return postcard will suffice; but if the addressee is in another country an IRC removes the necessity of acquiring foreign postage or sending appropriate currency.

== Description ==
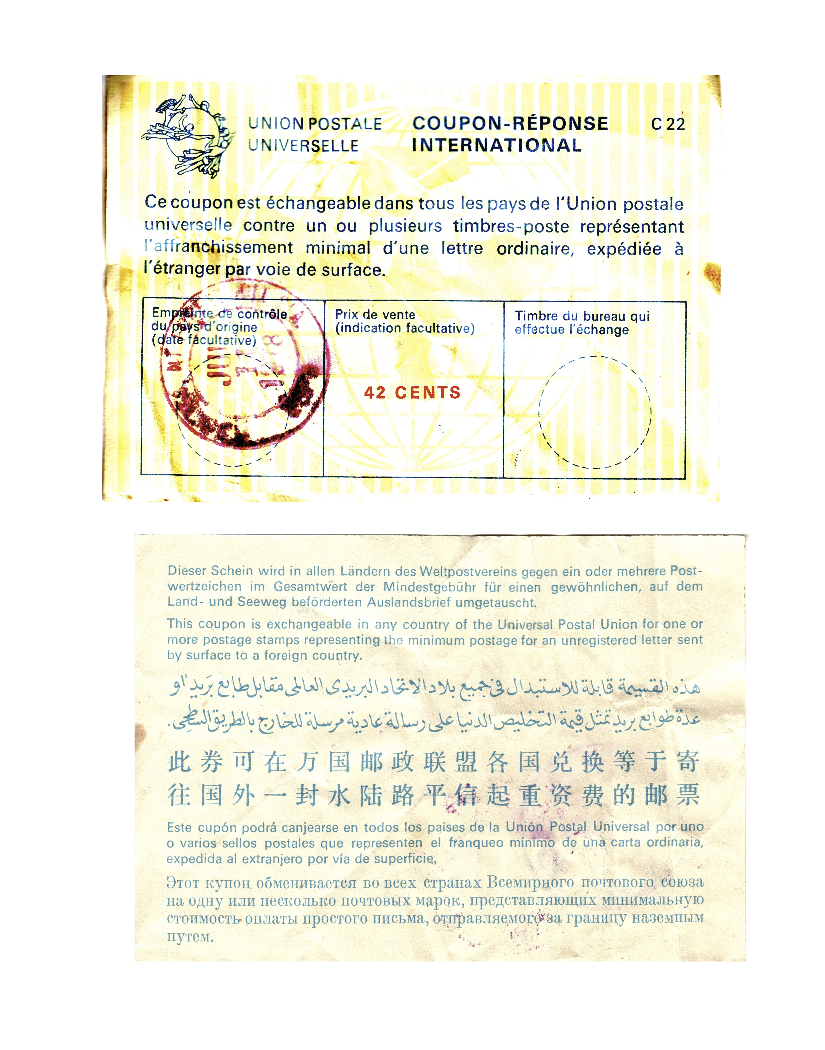
US Postal Service International Reply Coupon 1978

International reply coupons (in French, Coupons-Réponse Internationaux) are printed in blue ink on paper that has the letters "UPU" in large characters in the watermark. The front of each coupon is printed in French. The reverse side of the coupon, which has text relating to its use, is printed in German, English, Arabic, Chinese, Spanish, and Russian. Under Universal Postal Union regulations, participating member countries are not required to place a control stamp or postmark on the international reply coupons that they sell. Therefore, some foreign issue reply coupons that are tendered for redemption may bear the name of the issuing country (generally in French) rather than the optional control stamp or postmark.

The Nairobi Model was an international reply coupon printed by the Universal Postal Union which is approximately 3.75 inches by 6 inches and had an expiration date of 31 December 2013. This model was designed by Rob Van Goor, a graphic artist from the Luxembourg Post. It was selected from among 10 designs presented by Universal Postal Union member countries. Van Goor interpreted the theme of the contest – "The Postage Stamp: A Vehicle for Exchange" – by depicting the world being cradled by a hand and the perforated outline of a postage stamp.

The Doha Model is named for the 25th UPU congress held in Doha, Qatar, in 2012. The Doha model, designed by Czech artist and graphic designer Michal Sindelar, shows cupped hands catching a stream of water, to celebrate the theme of Water for Life. It expires after 31 December 2017.

The Istanbul Model was designed by graphic artist Nguyen Du (Vietnam) and features a pair of hands and a dove against an Arctic backdrop representing sustainable development in the postal sector. Ten countries participated in the competition which was held 7 October 2016, during the UPU congress in Istanbul, Turkey. It expires after 31 December 2021.

The Abidjan Model, named for the 27th Congress held in Abidjan, Ivory Coast from 9 to 27 August 2021, was designed by graphic artist Valeryia Tsimakhavets (Belarus) and features a tree with new leaves and birds which represent the ecosystem and climate protection. This model was originally set to expire after 31 December 2025. On 15 March 2024, the validity of the Abidjan IRC was extended to 31 December 2026.

IRCs will be discontinued after 31 December 2026.

== History ==
The IRC was introduced in 1906 at a Universal Postal Union congress in Rome. At the time an IRC could be exchanged for a single-rate, ordinary postage stamp for surface delivery to a foreign country, as this was before the introduction of airmail services. An IRC is exchangeable in a UPU member country for the minimum postage of a priority or unregistered airmail letter to a foreign country.

IRCs are ordered from the UPU headquarters in Bern, Switzerland by postal authorities. They are generally available at large post offices; in the U.S., they were requisitioned along with regular domestic stamps by any post office that had sufficient demand for them.

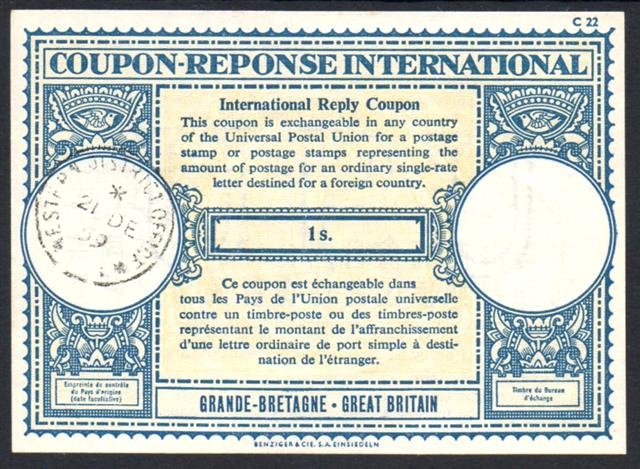
A British 1 Shilling IRC issued in 1959.

Prices for IRCs vary by country. In the United States in November 2012, the purchase price was $2.20 USD; however, the US Postal Service discontinued sales of IRCs on 27 January 2013 due to declining demand. Britain's Royal Mail also stopped selling IRCs on 31 December 2011, citing minimal sales and claiming that the average post office sold less than one IRC per year. IRCs purchased in foreign countries may be used in the United States toward the purchase of postage stamps and embossed stamped envelopes at the current one-ounce First Class International rate (US$1.20 as of November 2020) per coupon.

IRCs are often used by amateur radio operators sending QSL cards to each other; it has traditionally been considered good practice and common courtesy to include an IRC when writing to a foreign operator and expecting a reply by mail. If the operator's home country does not sell IRCs, then a foreign IRC may be used.

Previous editions of the IRC, the Beijing, Nairobi, Doha and Istanbul Models and all post-2000 versions, bear an expiration date. The current IRC, the Abidjan Model, although marked with an expiry of 31 December 2025 will now be valid until 31 December 2026. The Dubai Model was scheduled for release on 1 January 2027. However, on 17 September 2025, the Universal Postal Congress decided to discontinue the IRC after 31 December 2026.

== Country details ==
Since the 2010s, several countries have ceased selling International Reply Coupons. The Istanbul model was sold in 89 countries (designated operators) and the Abidjan model is sold in 76 countries. Below is the information of some countries.

=== Australia ===
As of November 2025, Australia Post still sells International Reply Coupons at a cost of $4.80 each.

=== China (Mainland) ===
As of 2024, China Post sells an IRC for 12 CNY, and exchanges a valid IRC for 7.4 CNY worth of postage (including equivalent imprinted stamps on postal stationery).

=== Finland ===
As of November 2024, Posti sells International Reply Coupons for 3.75 EUR, and exchanges a valid one for 2.75 EUR worth of stamps.

=== France and French Andorra ===
As of November 2026, La Poste sells an IRC (coupon-réponse international) for 2.25 EUR, which corresponds to the standard international postage for a letter up to 20 g.

=== Germany ===
Effective 1 July 2025, Deutsche Post discontinued the sale of IRCs (Internationaler Antwortschein) due to very low demand.

=== Hong Kong ===
As of November 2026, HongKong Post sells an IRC (國際回郵券) at the cost of 19 HKD and exchanges a valid IRC for postage up to 5.8 HKD.

=== Italy ===
Poste Italiane is slowly phasing out the sales of IRC (Buono di risposta internazionale). Only 10,000 Istanbul IRCs (2017-2021) were issued. As of November 2026, Poste Italiane sells an IRC for 2.00 EUR.

=== Japan ===
After October 2023, Japan Post sells an IRC (国際返信切手券) for 150 or 180 JPY, which can be exchanged for 130 or 160 JPY, respectively, worth of postage. A valid IRC purchased outside Japan can be exchanged for 160 JPY worth of postage, which is enough to deliver a letter all over the world by airmail (120 JPY by shipmail). The sales of IRC ended on 30 September 2026.

=== Luxembourg ===
As of November 2026, Post Luxembourg sells an IRC for 2.90 EUR.

=== Macao ===
As of 2024, Macau Post and Telecommunications (CTT) sells an IRC for 12 MOP, and exchanges a valid IRC for 6 MOP worth of postage, with a cost of redeeming stamps for 5 MOP.

=== Norway ===
As of March 2024, Posten sold IRCs online, and at their 30 remaining post offices. The cost was 38 NOK per IRC.

As of January 1, 2026 Posten no longer sells IRCs, however, they will still exchange valid IRCs through December 31, 2026 if you send them in the mail to the stamp fulfillment office in Oslo, in addition to the exchanged coupon you will also receive a domestic letter stamp as compensation for sending it in.

=== Singapore ===
Singapore Post sells IRCs at its GPO in Paya Lebar. IRCs are sold for S$2.50, and can be redeemed for S$1.40.

=== Switzerland ===
International reply coupons are sold by the Swiss Post in packs of 10 for 30 CHF.

=== Taiwan ===
After the adoption of United Nations General Assembly Resolution 2758, the Republic of China (Taiwan) lost its membership in the Universal Postal Union starting from April 13, 1972, and Chunghwa Post no longer issues IRCs since then. As of 2024, they only accept and exchange valid Japanese IRCs, for 13 TWD worth of stamps per Japanese IRC. (Note: There is no express document, but this is an email reply from Chunghwa Post.)

=== Vietnam ===
As of 1 July 2025, Vietnam Post sells an IRC for 27,000 VND.

=== Thailand ===
Thailand Post sells an IRC for 53 THB as of 2020.

=== Turkey ===
As of 2022, Turkish Post only sells IRCs through their administration branches.

Turkish Post exchanges a valid IRC for 10 TRY worth of stamps as of 2021. 10 TRY is not enough to deliver a letter all over the world. (E.g. a postcard to Japan requires 21 TRY.)

=== United Kingdom ===
The Royal Mail stopped selling IRCs on 31 December 2011 due to a lack of demand.

=== United States ===
The United States Postal Service stopped selling international reply coupons on 27 January 2013.

== The Ponzi scheme ==
In 1920, Charles Ponzi made use of the idea that profit could be made by taking advantage of the differing postal rates in different countries to buy IRCs cheaply in one country and exchange them for stamps of a higher value in another country. His attempts to raise money for this venture became instead the fraudulent Ponzi scheme.

In practice, the overhead on buying and selling large numbers of the very low-value IRCs precluded any profitability. The selling price and exchange value in stamps in each country have been adjusted to some extent to remove some of the potential for profit, but ongoing fluctuations in currency value and exchange rates make it impossible to achieve this completely, as long as stamps represent a specific currency value, instead of acting as vouchers granting specific postal services, devoid of currency nomination.

== See also ==
- Heys Collection
