= Alishan Post Office =

Post office in Alishan, Chiayi County, Taiwan

- 阿里山郵局
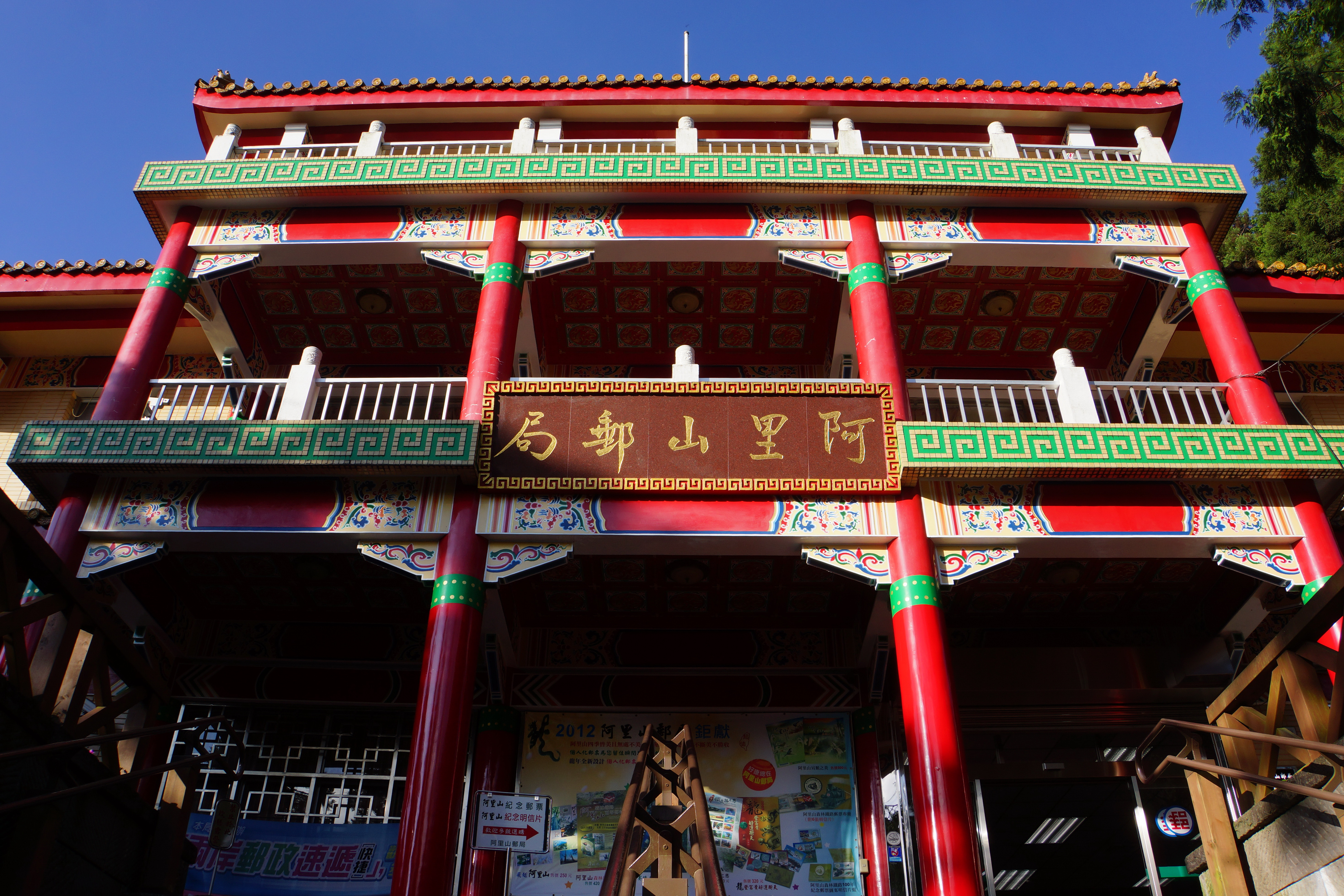
- Interactive map of the Alishan Post Office area

General information
- Type: post office
- Architectural style: traditional Chinese
- Location: Alishan, Chiayi County, Taiwan
- Coordinates: 23°30′41.2″N 120°48′16.6″E
- Elevation: 2,274 m (7,461 ft)
- Opened: 1 April 1907
- Owner: Chunghwa Post

Technical details
- Floor count: 3

Website
- Official website (in Chinese)

The Alishan Post Office (traditional Chinese: 阿里山郵局; simplified Chinese: 阿里山邮局; pinyin: Ālǐshān Yóujú) is a post office in Zhongzheng Village, Alishan Township, Chiayi County, Taiwan.

== Geography ==
At an elevation of 2,274 meters above sea level, the building is the highest post office in Taiwan.

== History ==
The post office building was originally established on 1 April 1907 as Chiayi branch 28 post office of Chunghwa Post.

== Architecture ==
The post office is a 3-story building built with traditional Chinese architectural style. The building exterior walls depict Alishan cultural symbols.

== See also ==
- List of tourist attractions in Taiwan
