= Contact (amateur radio) =

Exchange of information between amateur radio stations

An amateur radio contact, more commonly referred to as simply a "contact", is an exchange of information between two amateur radio stations. The exchange usually consists of an initial call, a response by another amateur radio operator at an amateur radio station, and a signal report. A contact is often referred to by the Q code QSO. It is often limited to just a minimal exchange of such station IDs. Stations that have made a contact are said to have worked each other. An operator may also say that he has worked a certain country. Amateurs use the slang expression ragchew or ragchewing to refer to an extended, informal conversation, a variation of the common idioms "chewing the fat" and "chewing the rag". Sometimes, a contact in person, between two ham radio operators, is humorously referred to as an "eyeball QSO". An All-Time New One (ATNO) is an operator's contact with an amateur station that they have never worked before on any band or mode.

Many amateurs will send QSL cards to stations they have worked.

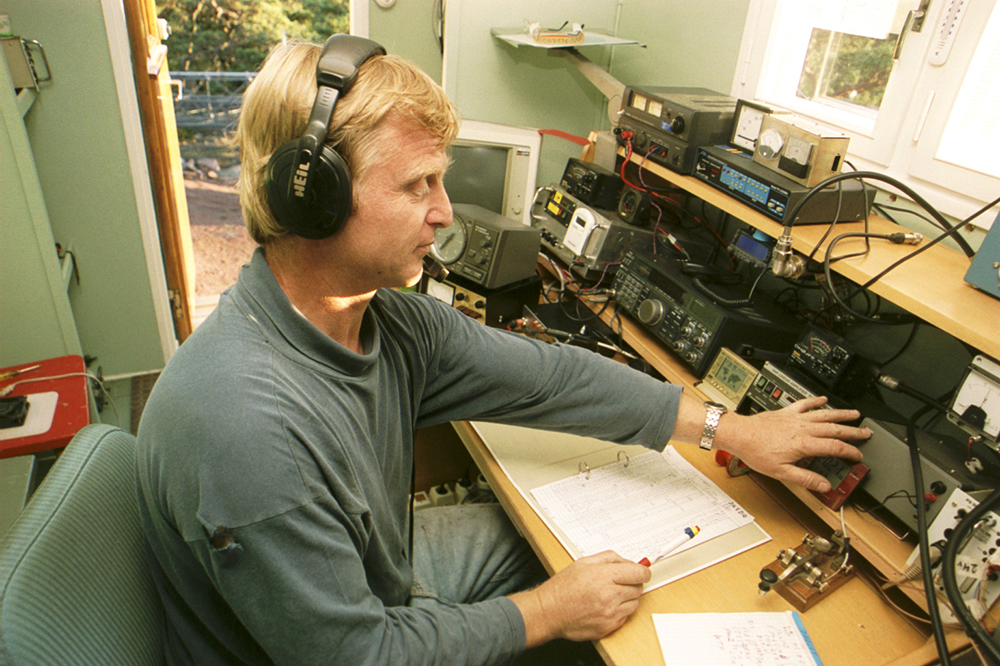
Radio amateur in the Åland Islands with open logbook

Amateur radio contacts are usually recorded in a logbook for future reference. Computer-based logging software, such as the American Radio Relay League's Logbook of the World, can also be used for this purpose. Logs and QSL cards can be kept as keepsakes and used as proof of contacts for awards, such as Worked All States or the DX Century Club.
