= Heys Collection =

British Library postal stamp collection

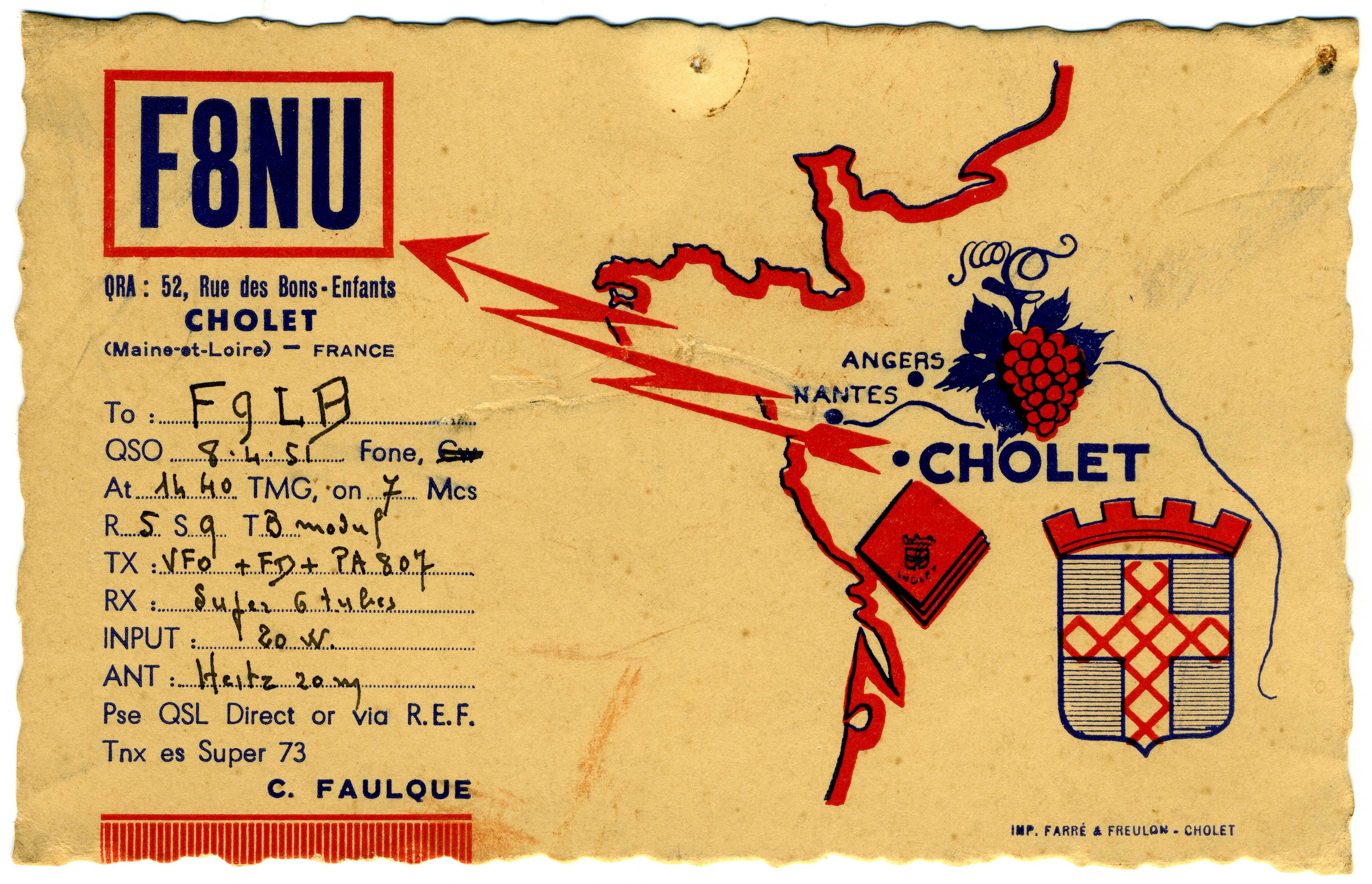
The information side of a 1951 QSL card from France. (Not from the Heys Collection)

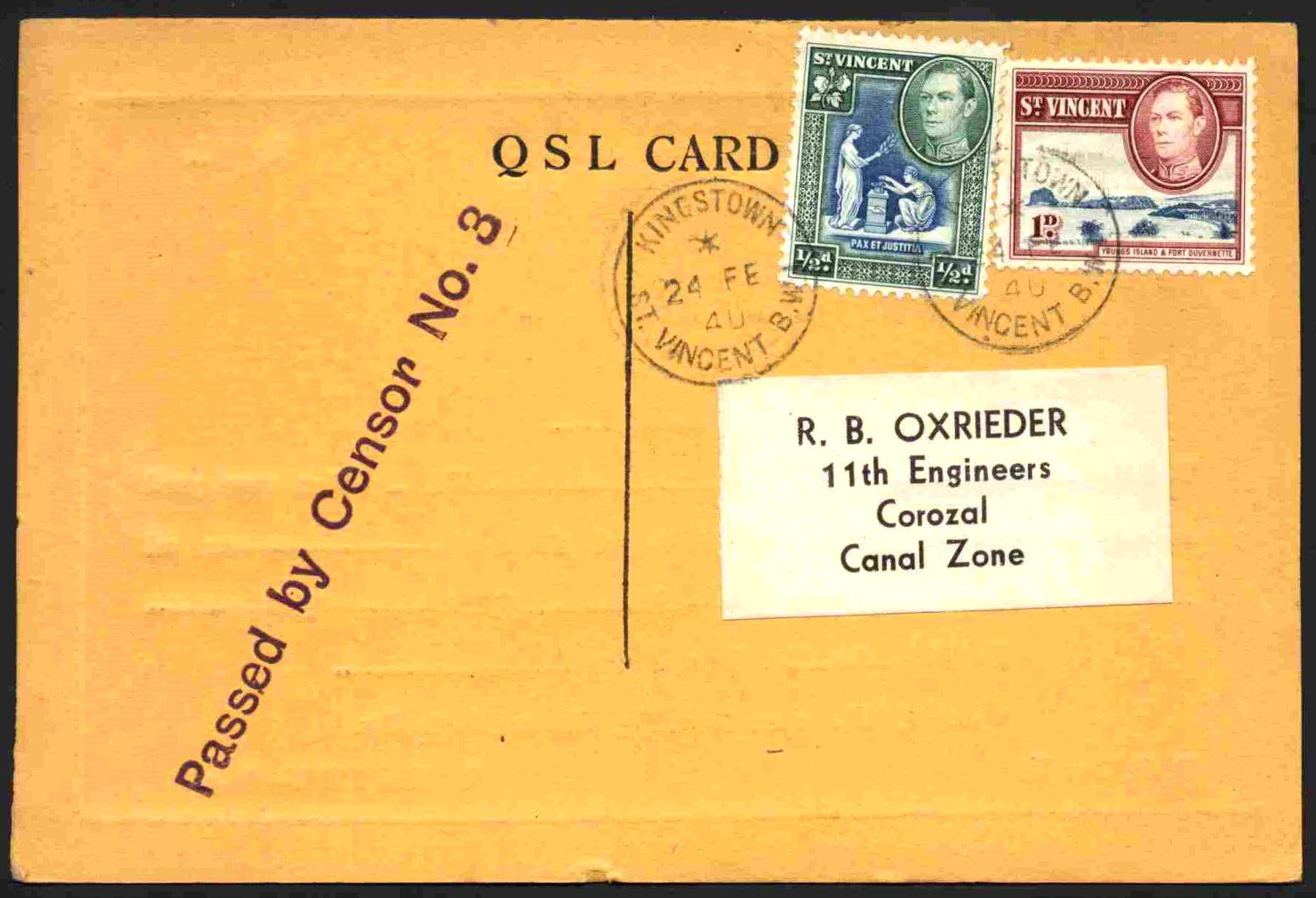
The postal side of a 1940 QSL card from St. Vincent. (Not from the Heys Collection)

The Heys Collection is a collection of philatelic material relating to amateur radio operators in Europe between 1930 and 1997 that forms part of the British Library Philatelic Collections. The collection includes stamps, QSL cards and international reply coupons among other things. It was formed by John Heys and donated to the library in 2001.
