= Logbook of The World =

Amateur radio verification database

Logbook of the World Logo

Logbook of the World (LoTW) is a web-accessed database provided by the American Radio Relay League (ARRL) to implement a contact verification service among amateur radio operators. Using LoTW, radio amateurs (hams) are able to claim and verify contacts (QSOs) made with other amateurs, generally for claiming credit for operating awards, such as DXCC. Previously, hams had to rely on paper QSL cards and submit to ARRL; A slow and somewhat expensive process. LoTW began operation in 2003.

== Confirmation process ==
The LoTW system uses "secure" authentication using cryptographic key distribution. An amateur's computer-based logbook, in ADIF or Cabrillo format, has to be "signed" using a key obtained from ARRL. (Logbook data includes callsigns and locations of stations, contact time, frequency, and operating mode.) ARRL assigns such keys to amateurs who appear in the U.S. FCC licensing database or to non-US amateurs who provide alternate proof of identity.

Once a log file is signed using ARRL's "TrustedQSL" (or equivalent) program, it is uploaded to the ARRL server and entered in the database.

Log records in the LoTW database are automatically compared so that when a contact at a particular time, operating mode, and frequency band is claimed by both participating amateurs (both of whom must have submitted their logs), a "QSL" (confirmation) is declared for a later award claim, e.g., for contacts with all U.S. states or 100 different countries. The matching process is blind, meaning that neither of the two stations can see pending confirmations before they upload a matching record. The LoTW QSL is purely electronic; there are no paper confirmations. However, a participant is able to print out a record of each confirmed contact, complete with its LoTW record number.

A LoTW-registered amateur is able to log into the LoTW website to view their logged QSOs and the verified QSL matches. When the amateur obtains a sufficient number of LoTW and/or traditional paper QSLs, they are able to apply for an ARRL award. As of January 2012, LoTW credit could be used for credit for awards issued by the ARRL and by CQ Magazine. The ARRL does not recognize other web-based QSL systems, such as eQSL, for awards credit.

== Statistics ==
As of May 26, 2022 the LoTW server provided the following information:

LOTW Statistics (May 26, 2022)
1,527,031,336	QSO records have been entered into the system.
329,084,756	QSL records have resulted.
159,231	Users are registered in the system
227,651	Certificates are active
55,553,189	User files have been processed
21.6%	Percentage of submitted QSO records confirmed as QSL records

== Software ==
All registered LoTW users have access to the main user data site: lotw.arrl.org. The TrustedQSL software for certificate management and logbook signing is available through the main LoTW information site: www.arrl.org/logbook-of-the-world. Versions of this software were available for many versions of Windows, Macintosh, and Linux operating systems.

Programmers' information and source code are available at trustedqsl.sourceforge.net, in particular the 2001 design specification.

LoTW functions are integrated into a number of amateur radio logging software packages, simplifying the signing and upload process.

== 2024 Network Access Incident ==
On May 16, 2024, the ARRL announced that it was responding to a "serious incident involving access" to its network and headquarters-based systems. This incident resulted in access to Logbook of the World being unavailable. According to one source, the incident is of cyberattack nature.
