= Jamboree on the Trail =

- Genre: Scouting activity
- Frequency: 2nd Saturday in May
- Location: International
- Website: jamboreeonthetrail.org

Jamboree on the Trail, known by its acronym JOTT, was a co-ordinated international Scouting activity held annually, following on the idea of the Join-in events from the World Jamboree Year. Scouts from all over the world simultaneously participated in their local area by holding a hiking event.

The event took place on an annual basis on the 2nd Saturday in May. The event began in 1998, and grew into an international tradition. It is a non-competitive event, and the emphasis is on fostering camaraderie, appreciation for nature, and a sense of global solidarity among Scouts worldwide.

Participants were awarded a JOTT badge as a recognition of having participated in this worldwide event. This provided the Scouts with a means of participating in an activity at the same time as fellow Scouts from around the world. It was an adjunct activity to the World Scout Jamboree as well as Jamboree on the Air and Jamboree on the Internet.

The final JOTT (#26) was held on 13 May 2023, after which the worldwide hike chief retired the event.

Trail Jam has now picked up the reigns from JOTT, starting in 2024.

== See also ==
- Jamboree on the Air (JOTA)
- Jamboree on the Internet (JOTI)
- ScoutLink
