= Jamboree on the Internet =

International Scouting activity

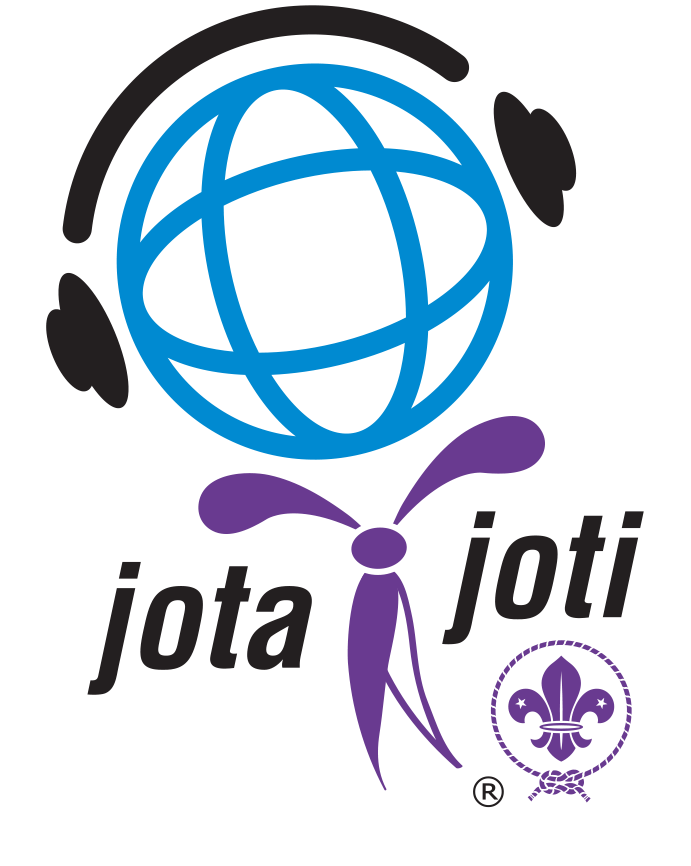

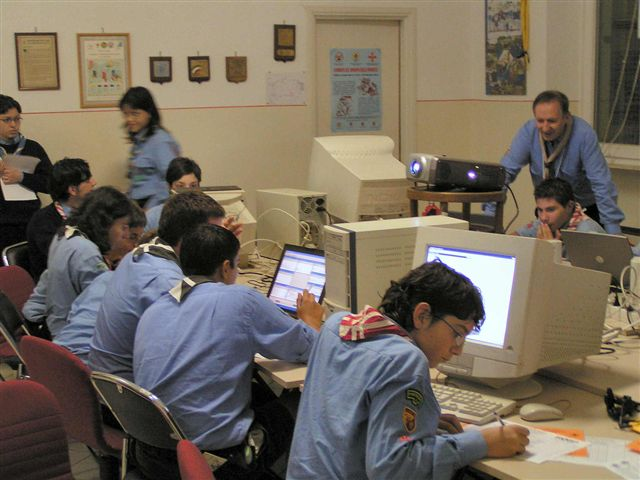
- Scouts at their computers during Jamboree on the Internet
- Genre: Scouting activity
- Frequency: Annually
- Inaugurated: 1995
- Founder: Queanbeyan Rovers
- Area: International

Jamboree on the Internet, known by its acronym JOTI, is an international Scouting activity held annually. Participants, through the use of designated Chats from all over the world, can contact their fellow Scouts by means of the Internet. Common communication methods include ScoutLink (IRC), e-mail, and VOIP. This provides the Scouts with a means of learning about fellow Scouts from around the world. JOTI operates alongside Jamboree on the Air (JOTA) and is an official event of the World Organization of the Scout Movement.

== History ==
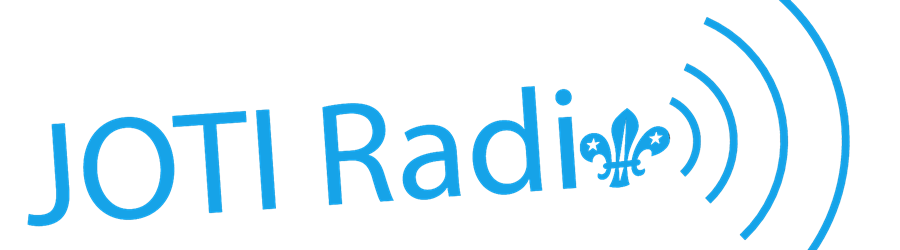
JOTI Radio Logo

JOTI was pioneered in 1995 by Queanbeyan Rovers when one Rover, Norvan Vogt was on a student exchange in the Netherlands, with the home crew in Australia coordinated by Brett Sheffield. They connected Putten, Netherlands and Queanbeyan, Australia with dedicated IRC servers. In November 1996 the World Scout Committee, noting that Scouting already had a considerable presence on the Internet, there was already an informal and rapidly growing Jamboree on the Internet, decided that JOTI should become an official international Scouting event, it should be held on the same weekend as the Jamboree on the Air (JOTA), the third full weekend of October each year, starting at 00:00 hours local time on Saturday and concluding 48 hours later at 24:00 hours local time on Sunday.

Special Internet Jamborees may also be organized in conjunction with local, national and international Scouting events which are held at other times of the year. Getting together does not always require a physical presence. In 1957, the concept of the World Scout Jamboree on the Air (JOTA) was launched, and it has been a popular event which today involves more than half-a-million Scouts and Girl Guides who communicate with each other on the third weekend of each October by amateur radio and related technology. In the mid 1990s the means for international electronic communication became available to virtually anyone with a computer. Scouts have been among the first to use every technological development to "get together" electronically. The spontaneous and overwhelming involvement of Scouts on the Internet is proof that it is a viable way of bringing Scouts together in ways that Baden-Powell probably would have wanted to use to the fullest.

JOTI.org reports that JOTI had over 4,000 participants online at one time in 2005. 2011 saw the first ever 'JOTI Radio' station founded by Scout Radio, a broadcast internet radio station based in the UK to provide entertainment for the JOTI weekend, which had live interviews from Scouts all over the world, the team that lead JOTI Radio are now made up of the 'Avon Scout Radio' team, which are a County Active Support Unit for Avon Scouts and provide broadcast radio services within the Scouting movement worldwide. JOTI Radio is now part of the annual JOTA-JOTI weekend. In 2014, over 2,300 different computers were used to listen to JOTI Radio over the course of the weekend.

In 2014, almost 80% of participants used Scouts can speak, while 60% used the IRC platform provided by ScoutLink, while a further 30% used the ScoutLink TeamSpeak server.

In 2015, participants using IRC increased to 80%, while use of TeamSpeak decreased to 28% and 80% used Scouts can speak.

== See also ==
- Jamboree on the Trail (JOTT)
- Jamboree on the Air (JOTA)
- ScoutLink
