= Guides on the Air =

Guides on the Air (GOTA), also known as Thinking Day on the Air (TDOTA), is an event for Girl Guides. It is held the third full weekend in February, close to Thinking Day, which is February 22. Girl Guides and Girl Scouts get together with amateur radio operators to talk to sisters in Guiding and Scouting around the world over the air and more recently in various other ways, such as IRC (Guides on the Internet). In Canada GOTA is sponsored by the Canadian Ladies Amateur Radio Association.

== See also ==
- Jamboree on the Air, a similar event for Boy Scouts
- Lone Guides
- Thinking Day
