= Chunghwa Post =

Official postal service of Taiwan

Chunghwa Post Co., Ltd.
- Native name: 中華郵政股份有限公司
- Type: Government-owned corporation
- Industry: Post, Philately
- Founded: 1878 (Customs Post Office), 1896 (Great Qing Post), 2003 (major restructuring)
- Headquarters: No.55, Sec. 2, Jinshan S. Rd., Da'an District, Taipei City 10603, Taiwan (R.O.C.).
- Key people: Wei, Chien-hung (Chairperson); Chen, Shian-juh (President)
- Products: First-Class Mail, domestic mail, philatelic services, logistics
- Services: Postal services, courier, money savings
- Revenue: ▼217.725 billion NT (2017)
- Operating income: ▲176.51 billion NT (2017)
- Net income: ▲10.208 billion NT (2017)
- Total assets: ▲7 trillion NT (2017)
- Number of employees: Approx. 26,000
- Parent: Chunghwa Shipping & Post Group
- Website: https://www.post.gov.tw/post/internet/U_english2/default.jsp

Chunghwa Post Co., Ltd.
- Traditional Chinese: 中華郵政股份有限公司
- Simplified Chinese: 中华邮政股份有限公司
- Literal meaning: Chinese Postal Service Joint-stock Limited Company
Transcriptions
Standard Mandarin
- Hanyu Pinyin: Zhōnghuá Yóuzhèng Gǔfèn Yǒuxiàngōngsī
Southern Min
- Hokkien POJ: Tiong-hôa-iû-chèng-kó͘-hūn-iú-hān-kong-si

Chunghwa Post
- Traditional Chinese: 中華郵政
- Simplified Chinese: 中华邮政
- Literal meaning: Chinese Postal Service
Transcriptions
Standard Mandarin
- Hanyu Pinyin: Zhōnghuá Yóuzhèng
Southern Min
- Hokkien POJ: Tiong-hôa-iû-chèng

Chunghwa Post (Chinese: 中華郵政; pinyin: Zhōnghuá Yóuzhèng; lit. 'Chinese Postal Service'), officially Chunghwa Post Co., Ltd., is the national postal service of Taiwan (Republic of China). Chunghwa Post was a government agency of the Ministry of Transportation and Communications until 2003, when it was reorganized into a government-owned corporation.

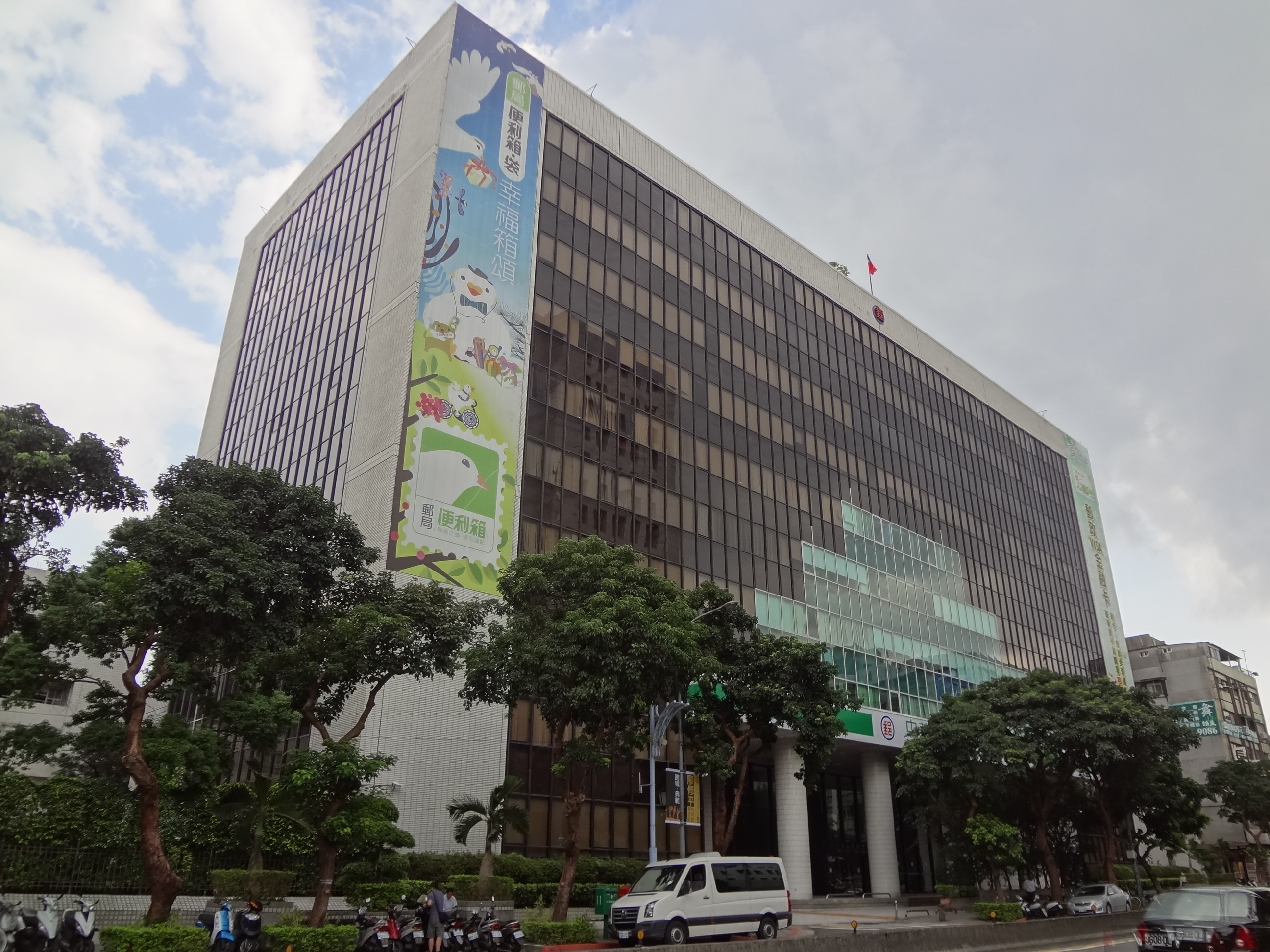
Chunghwa Post Jinshan Building

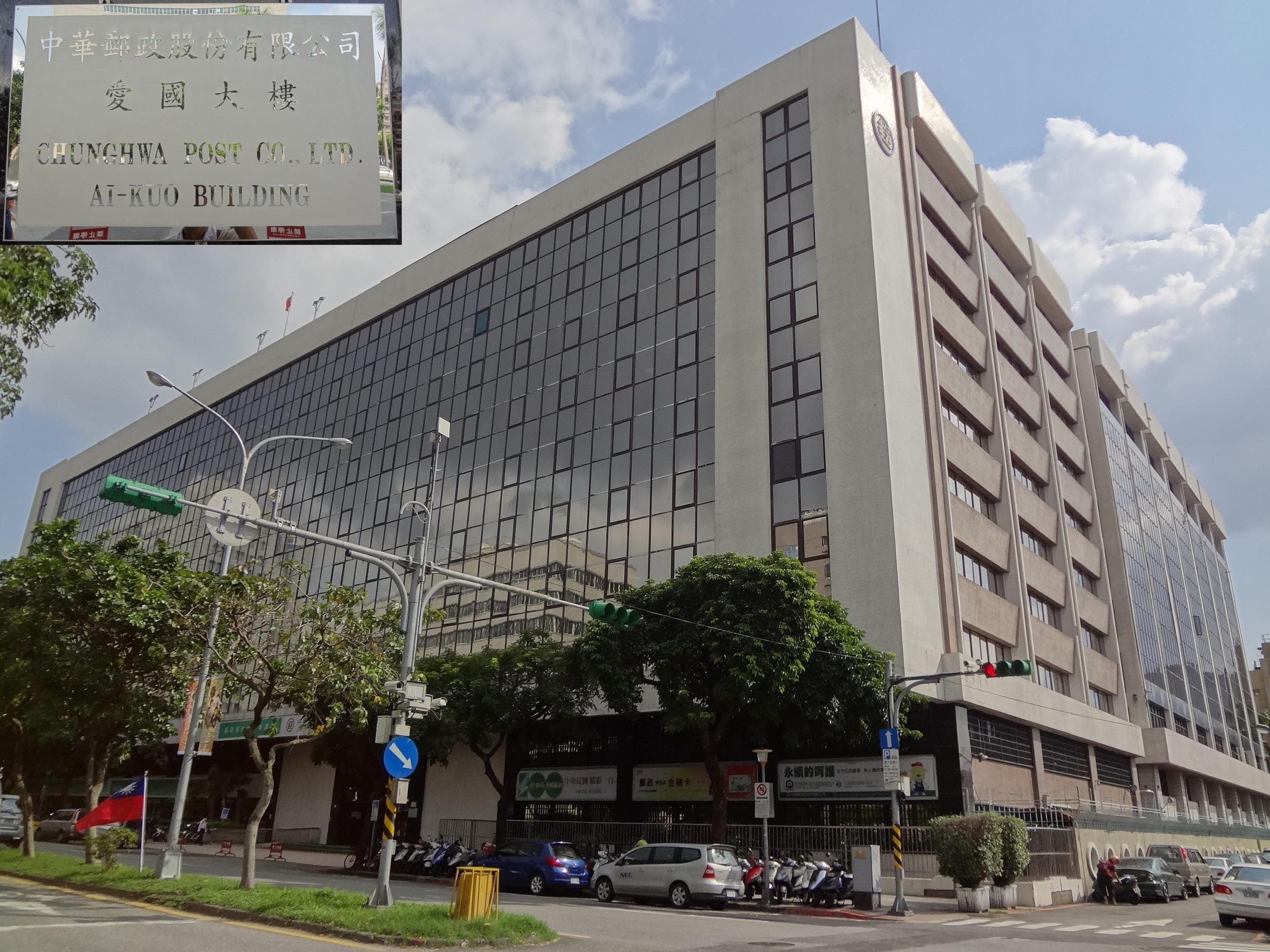
Chunghwa Post Ai-Kuo Building

Its affiliation with the Universal Postal Union (UPU) began in 1914, but ended in 1972 when it was replaced by China Post shortly after China's seat in the United Nations was handed over to the People's Republic of China.

International reply coupons are not available to Taiwan, and mail is not delivered to or sent from Taiwan directly, but rather routed through third-party countries (for example, Japan Post routes most incoming mail sent from the Americas). Under the name "Chinese Taipei", Taiwan is a member of the Fédération Internationale de Philatélie and the Inter-Asian Philatelic Federation. It also provides savings account, debit card and life insurance services.

== Facilities ==
Chunghwa Post delivers standard letters, registered mail, parcels, and express mail throughout Taiwan. There are twenty-three large offices throughout the country which supervises some 1,300 smaller post offices.

== History ==
=== Origins of Chunghwa Post ===
The direct ancestor of Chunghwa Post is the Customs Post Office of the Qing Empire, established in 1878 by Li Hongzhang at the suggestion of the foreign powers, with branch offices in five major trading cities. On 20 March 1896, the Customs Post Office became the Great Qing Post, which in 1911 became independent of the customs service.

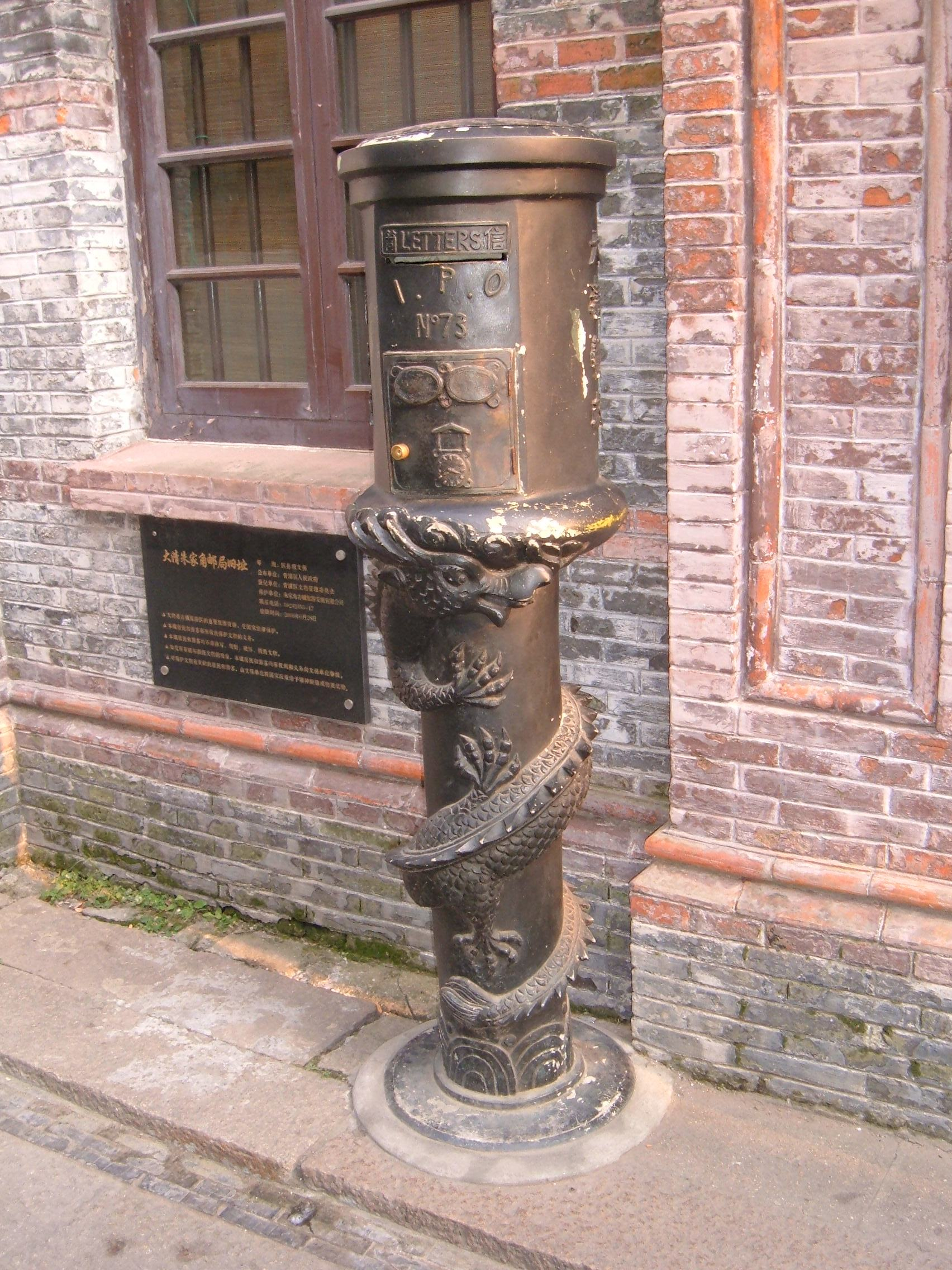
Great Qing Post mailbox.

On 1 January 1912, the Republic of China was established, replacing the Qing dynasty. The Great Qing Post changed its name to the Chunghwa Post "Chunghwa" is a transliteration of one of the names of China (中華), which connotes the multi-ethnic nation under a unified culture of "China". Alternatively spelled "Zhonghua" (in pinyin transliteration), this term is part of the Chinese language name of both the Republic of China and the People's Republic of China.

=== Early airmail service ===
Chunghwa post had contracted with aviation groups such as China National Aviation Corporation and China Airways Federal to deliver airmail on the Shanghai-Hankou, Nanjing-Beijing, and the Hankou-Canton routes in early 1929. It was on the Nanjing-Beijing route, where renown early-20th century poet Xu Zhimo caught a flight, but died as the airmail-carrier plane operated by China Airways Federal under contract, crashed in rough weather.

=== Early postal service in Taiwan ===
In 1888, Liu Mingchuan, Qing Governor of Taiwan Province, established the Taiwan General Post Office (GPO) of the Great Qing Postal service (大清郵政官局). However, in 1895, Taiwan was ceded to Japan following the First Sino-Japanese War. The Taiwan GPO was abolished, with postal service in Taiwan conducted by a variety of bodies such as the Field Command postal service, and after 1924, the Letters Department of the Ministry of Transport.

=== After World War II ===
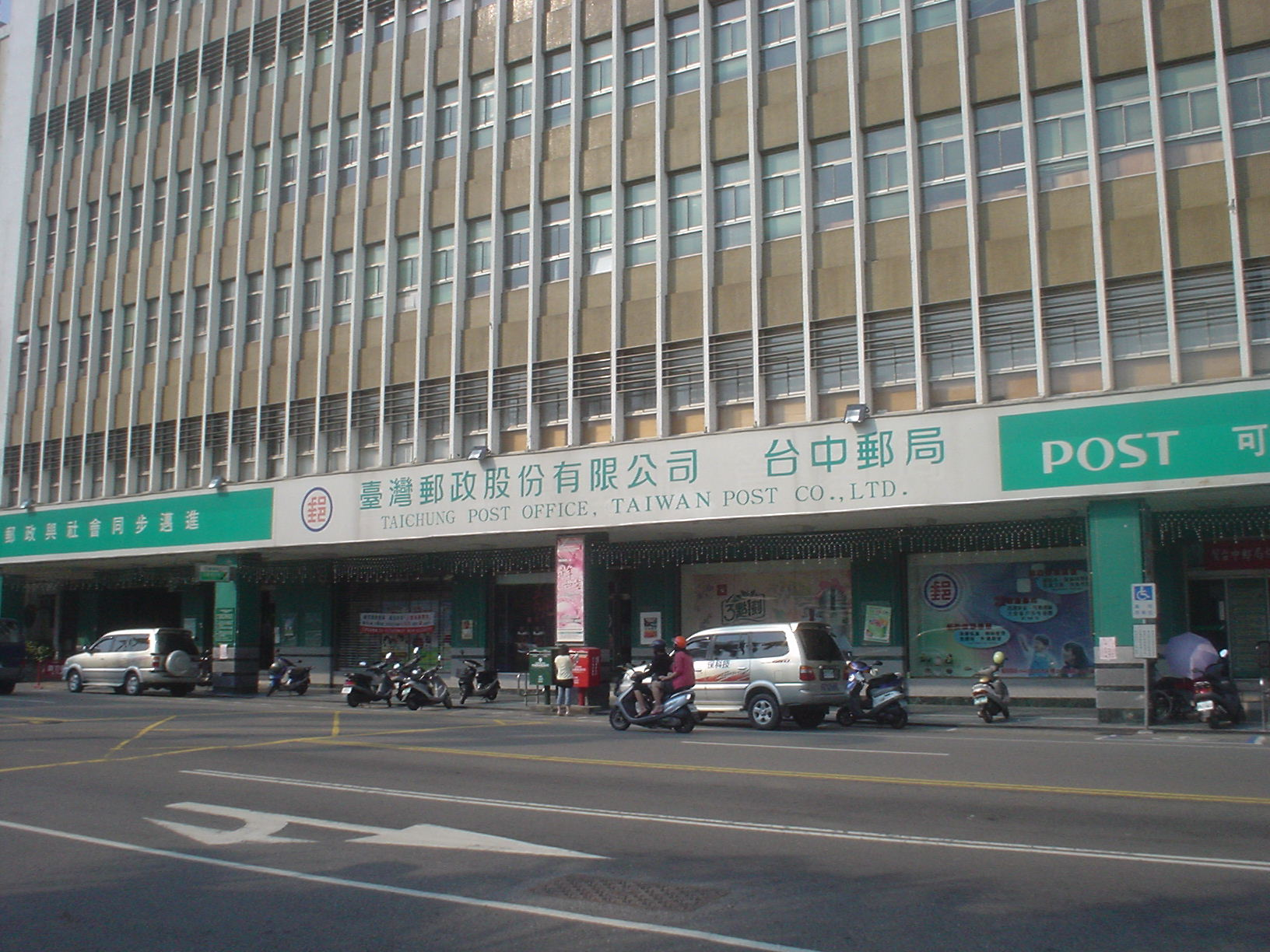
Taichung Post Office when the Chunghwa Post was renamed to the "Taiwan Post".

Taiwan was taken over by the Republic of China in 1945. In 1946, the Republic of China government incorporated the postal service in Taiwan with the Directorate General of Posts. In 1949, the Republic of China lost control of mainland China to the Chinese Communist Party, which founded the People's Republic of China. Soon after, postal service was restricted to Taiwan, several surrounding islands, and a few islands off the coast of mainland China still under the control of the Republic of China government. In 2003, the Directorate General of Posts of the Ministry of Transportation and Communications was restructured from a government department to a government-owned corporation, and renamed Chunghwa Post Co., Ltd.

=== Name changes ===
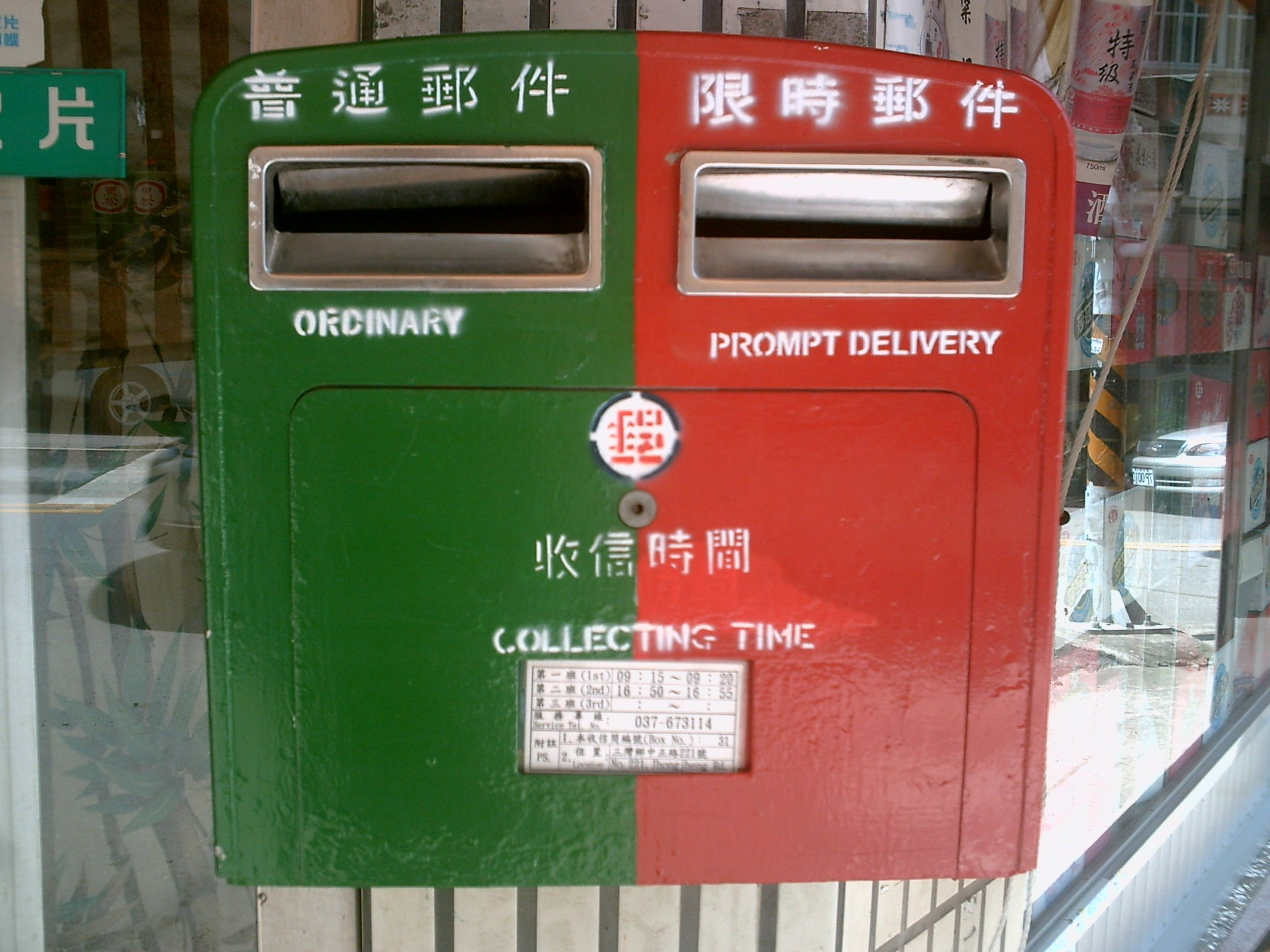
Chunghwa Post mailbox

In February 2007, ROC President Chen Shui-bian announced that the name of the postal service would be changed to Taiwan Post, with sign changes occurring at branches in Taiwan on February 12. Media reports noted that "Taiwan Post" was more consistent with the name Governor Liu Ming-chuan used when he founded the Taiwan Post Administration in 1888. Furthermore, Taiwan Post began printing "Taiwan" instead of "Republic of China" on postage stamps.

On February 9, the board of directors resolved to change the name of the corporation to Taiwan Post Co. (台灣郵政) after a delay of several hours due to protests from unions. However, a bill to recognize the change of law was blocked by the KMT-dominated legislature. As a result, the law still mandated the postal monopoly for "Chunghwa Post" despite the name change.

In 2008, the Kuomintang took power in Taiwan following a legislative election victory and the election of Ma Ying-jeou to the presidency. Following his election, Ma Ying-jeou publicly stated that he did not wish his inauguration commemorative stamps to be marked "Taiwan Post", because the name change was illegal. The postal service marked the inauguration stamps with Chinese characters for the "Republic of China", as well as "Republic of China (Taiwan)" in English.

On 1 August 2008, the company resolved to reverse the name change and restored the name "Chunghwa Post". The Board of Directors, as well as resolving to restore the name of the corporation, also resolved to re-hire the chief executive dismissed in 2007, and to withdraw defamation proceedings against him.

== See also ==
- China Post
- Chunghwa Postal Museum
- Postage stamps and postal history of Taiwan
- List of postal services abroad
