= Jamboree on the Air =

Annual scouting event

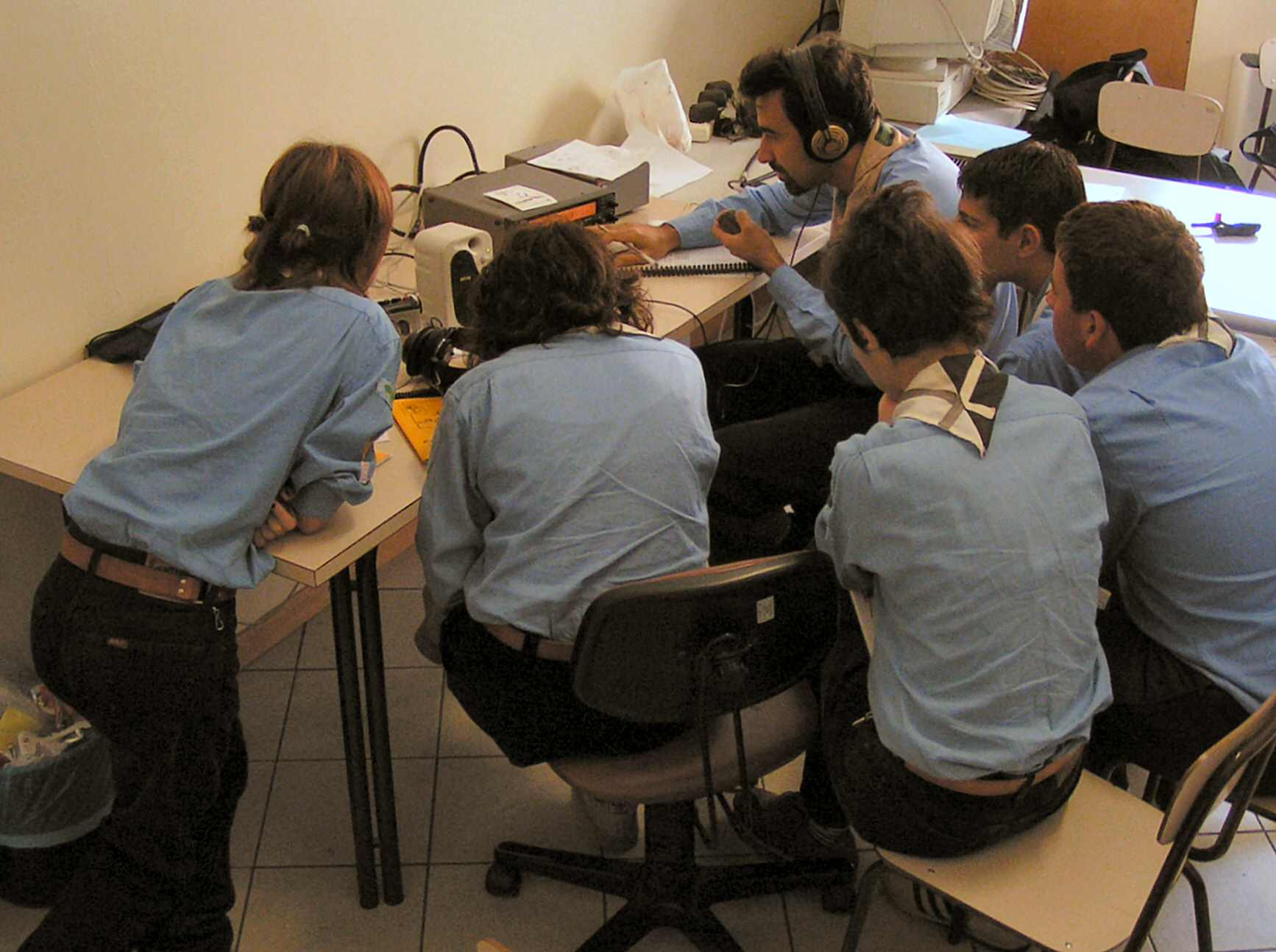
- Scouts talking on the radio during Jamboree on the Air
- Genre: International Scouting and Guiding activity
- Frequency: Third full weekend in October
- Participants: 500,000
- Area: Worldwide

Jamboree on the Air, known by its acronym JOTA, is an international Scouting and Guiding activity held annually; it is on the third full weekend in October. First held in conjunction with the fiftieth anniversary of Scouting in 1957, it was devised by Leslie R. Mitchell, a radio amateur with the callsign G3BHK. It is now considered the largest event scheduled by the World Organization of the Scout Movement annually.

Amateur radio operators from all over the world participate with over 500,000 Scouts and Guides to teach them about radio and to assist them to contact their fellow Scouts and Guides by means of amateur radio and since 2004, by the VOIP-based Echolink. This provides the Scouts and Guides with a means of learning about fellow Scouts and Guides from around the world. Scouts and Guides are also encouraged to send paper or electronic confirmations known as "QSL cards", or "eQSLs" when they are sent electronically. In recent years, a parallel Jamboree on the Internet (JOTI) has developed. It is an adjunct to the World Scout Jamboree.

The event is recognized as one of international participation by the various Scout and Guide organisations, and supports several awards which are a part of Scouting and Guiding programmes. The Boy Scouts of America recognizes this as an international Scouting event for the Citizenship in the World Merit Badge.

== See also ==
- Guides on the Air
- Jamboree on the Trail (JOTT)
- Jamboree on the Internet (JOTI)
