= QSL card =

Amateur radio transmission confirmation card

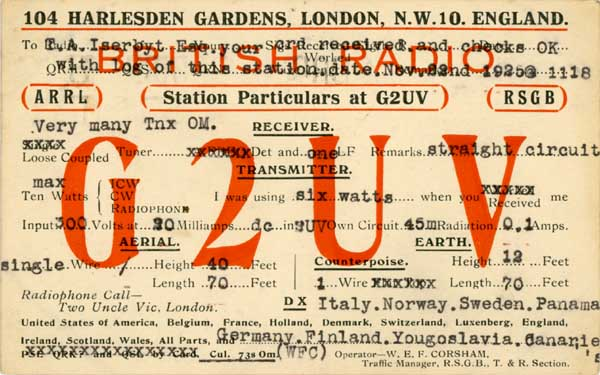
A 1925 QSL card from amateur radio operator Bill Corsham, G2UV.

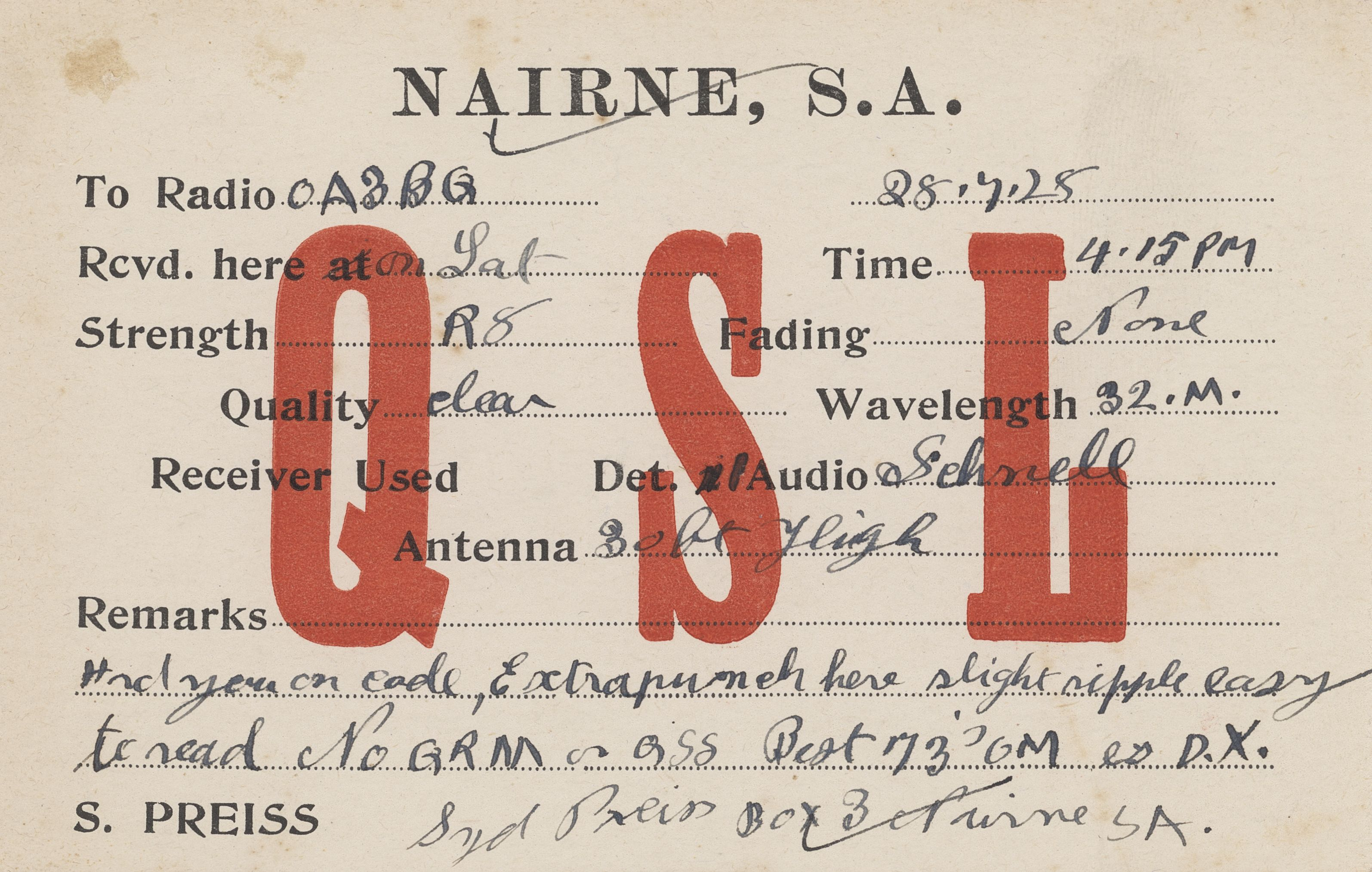
QSL card from Syd Preiss, Nairne, South Australia to VK3BQ Max Howden. Many shortwave listeners printed their own QSL cards to report reception.

A QSL card is a written confirmation of either a two-way radiocommunication between two amateur radio or citizens band stations; a one-way reception of a signal from an AM radio, FM radio, television or shortwave broadcasting station; or the reception of a two-way radiocommunication by a third party listener. A typical QSL card is the same size and made from the same material as a typical postcard, and most are sent through the mail as such.

QSL card derived its name from the Q code "QSL". A Q code message can stand for a statement or a question (when the code is followed by a question mark). In this case, 'QSL?' (note the question mark) means "Do you confirm receipt of my transmission?" while 'QSL' (without a question mark) means "I confirm receipt of your transmission."

== History ==
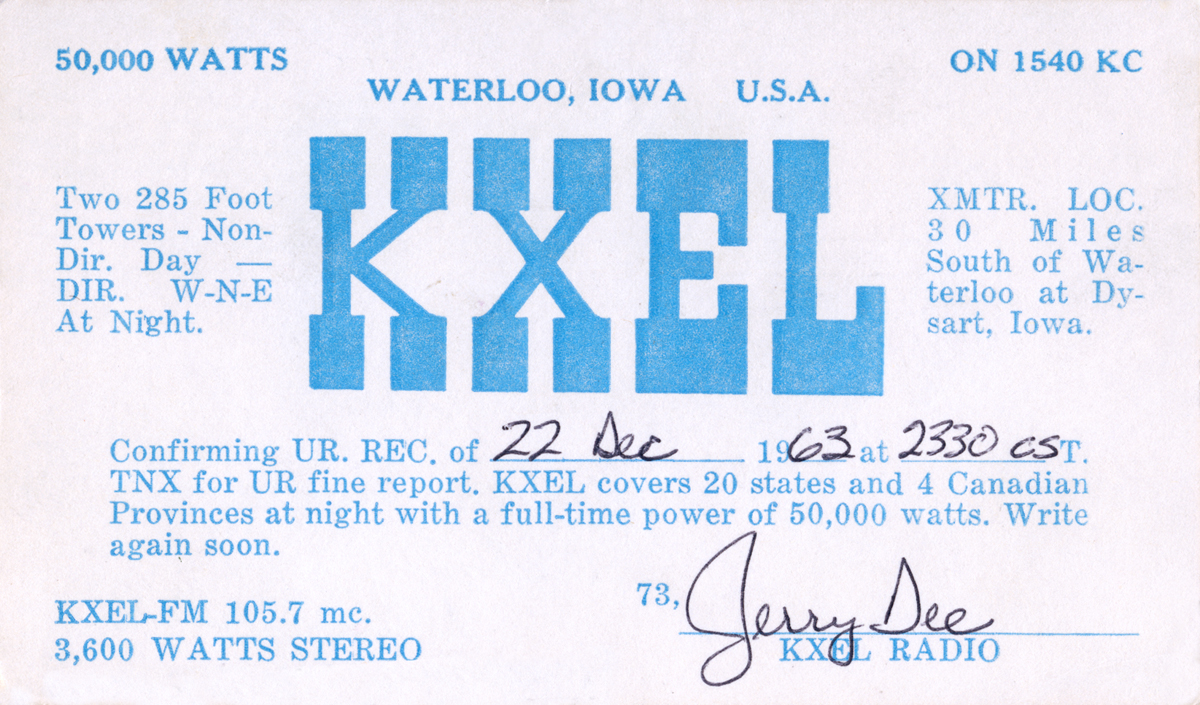
QSL card confirming listener reception of AM radio station KXEL in Waterloo, Iowa.

During the early days of radio broadcasting, the ability for a radio set to receive distant signals was a source of pride for many consumers and hobbyists. Listeners would mail "reception reports" to radio broadcasting stations in hopes of getting a written letter to officially verify they had heard a distant station. As the volume of reception reports increased, stations took to sending post cards containing a brief form that acknowledged reception. Collecting these cards became popular with radio listeners in the 1920s and 1930s, and reception reports were often used by early broadcasters to gauge the effectiveness of their transmissions.

The concept of sending a post card to verify reception of a station (and later two-way contact between them) may have been independently invented several times. The earliest reference seems to be a card sent in 1916 from 8VX in Buffalo, New York to 3TQ in Philadelphia, Pennsylvania (in those days ITU prefixes were not used). The standardized card with callsign, frequency, date, etc. may have been developed in 1919 by C.D. Hoffman, 8UX, in Akron, Ohio. In Europe, W.E.F. "Bill" Corsham, 2UV, first used a QSL when operating from Harlesden, England in 1922.

== Use in amateur radio ==
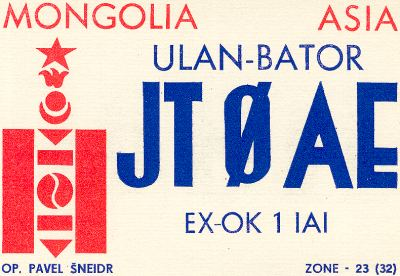
QSL card.

Amateur radio operators exchange QSL cards to confirm two-way radio contact between stations. Each card contains details about one or more contacts, the station and its operator. At a minimum, this includes the call sign of both stations participating in the contact, the time and date when it occurred (usually specified in UTC), the radio frequency or band used, the mode of transmission used, and a signal report. The International Amateur Radio Union and its member societies recommend a maximum size of 3 1/2 by 5 1/2 inches (90 by 140 mm).

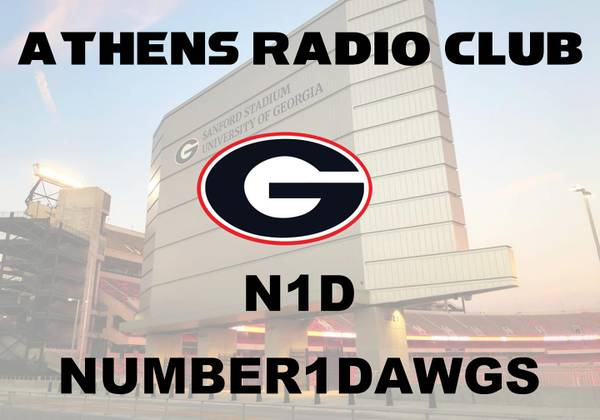
N1D-QSL Card celebrating University of Georgia Football as National Champions by the Athens Radio Club, Athens, Georgia, 2022.

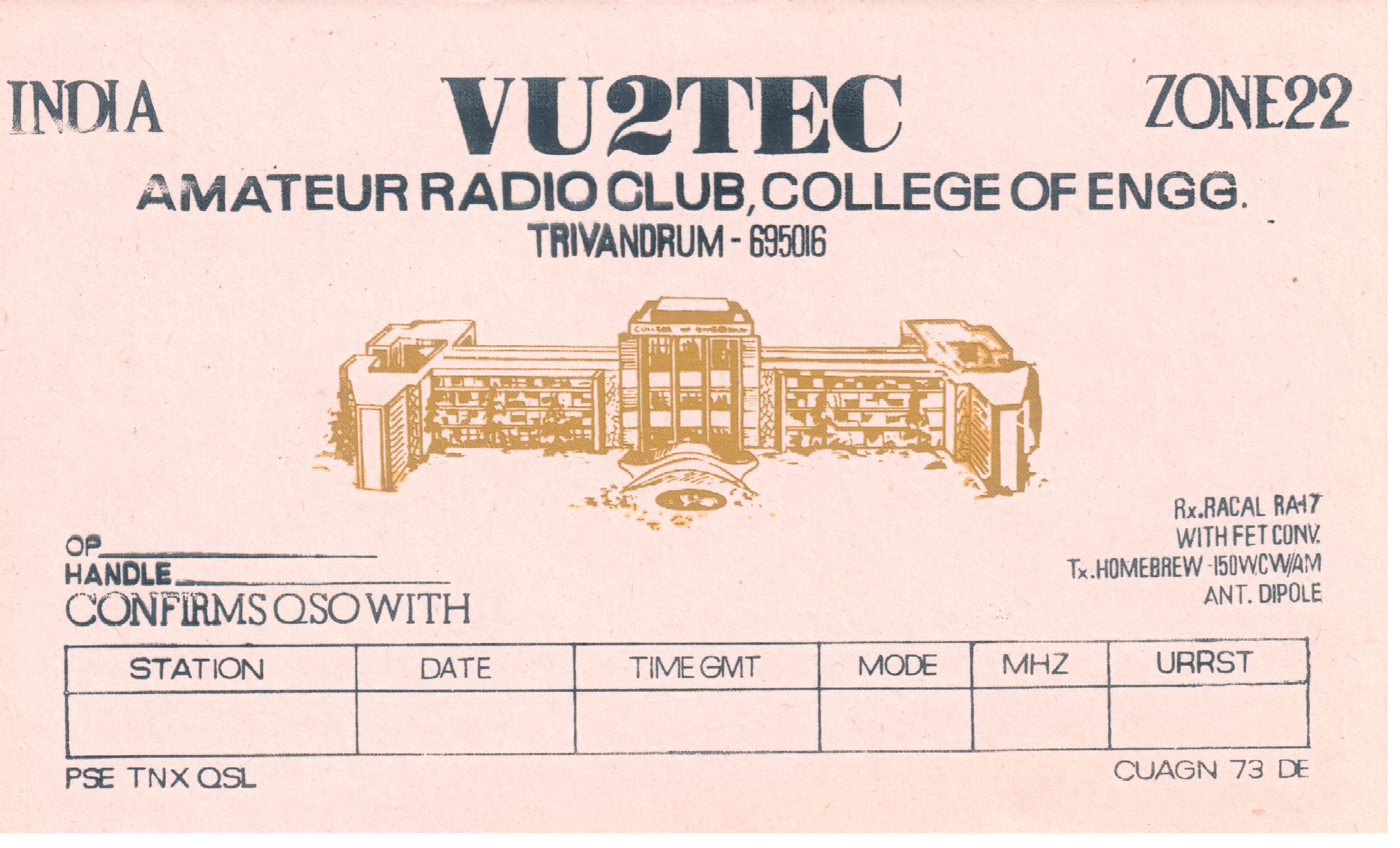
The QSL card used by HAM club in College of Engineering, Trivandrum, Kerala in India, during mid 1980s. The club is not active now.

Although some QSL cards are plain, they are a ham radio operator's calling card and are therefore frequently used for the expression of individual creativity—from a photo of the operator at their station to original artwork, images of the operator's home town or surrounding countryside, etc. Consequently, the collecting of QSL cards with especially interesting designs has become a frequent addition to the simple gathering of printed documentation of a ham's communications over the course of their radio career.

Normally sent using ordinary, international postal systems, QSL cards can be sent either direct to an individual's address, or via a country's centralized amateur radio association QSL bureau, which collects and distributes cards for that country. This saves postage fees for the sender by sending several cards destined for a single country in one envelope, or large numbers of cards using parcel services. Although this reduces postage costs, it increases the delivery time because of the extra handling time involved. In addition to such incoming bureaus, there are also outgoing bureaus in some countries. These bureaus offer further postage savings by accepting cards destined for many countries and repackaging them together into bundles that are sent to specific incoming bureaus. Most QSL bureaus operated by national amateur radio societies are both incoming and outgoing, with the exception of the United States of America, and are coordinated by the International Amateur Radio Union (IARU).

For rare countries, that is, ones where there are very few amateur radio operators, places with no reliable (or even existing) postal systems, including expeditions to remote areas, a volunteer QSL manager may handle the mailing of cards. For expeditions this may amount to thousands of cards, and payment for at least postage is appreciated, and is required for a direct reply (as opposed to a return via a bureau).

The Internet has enabled electronic notification as an alternative to mailing a physical card. These systems use computer databases to store the same information normally verified by QSL cards, in an electronic format. Some sponsors of amateur radio operating awards, which normally accept QSL cards for proof of contacts, may also recognize a specific electronic QSL system in verifying award applications.

- Two systems, QRZ and eQSL, enable electronic exchange of QSLs as JPEG or GIF images which can then be printed as cards on the recipient's local inkjet or laser printer, or displayed on the computer monitor. Many logging programs now have direct electronic interfaces to transmit QSO details in real-time into the eQSL.cc database. CQ Amateur Radio magazine began accepting electronic QSLs from eQSL.cc for its four award programs in January 2009. 10-10 has been accepting eQSLs since 2002.
- Another system, the ARRL's Logbook of The World (LoTW), allows confirmations to be submitted electronically for that organization's DX Century Club and Worked All States awards. Confirmations are in the form of database records, electronically signed with the private key of the sender. This system simply matches database records but does not allow creation of pictorial QSL cards.

Despite the advantages of electronic QSLs, physical QSL cards are often historical or sentimental keepsakes of a memorable location heard or worked, or of a pleasant contact with a new radio friend, and serious ham radio operators may have thousands of them. Some cards are plain, while others are multicolored and may be oversized or double paged.

== Usage in shortwave listening ==
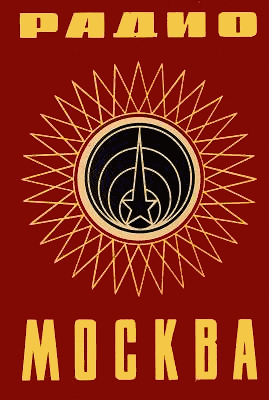
A Radio Moscow QSL card from 1969.

International shortwave broadcasters have traditionally issued QSL cards to listeners to verify reception of programming, and also as a means of judging the size of their audiences, effective reception distances, and technical performance of their transmitters. QSL cards can also serve as publicity tools for the shortwave broadcaster, and sometimes the cards will include cultural information about the country.

The High Frequency Active Auroral Research Program has occasionally requested reception information on its shortwave experiments, in return for which it sent back QSL cards. Standard frequency and time stations, such as WWV, will also send QSL cards in response to listeners reports. Other shortwave utility stations, such as marine and aviation weather broadcasters, may QSL, as do some pirate radio stations, usually through mail drop boxes.

== Usage in CB radio ==
CB radio enthusiasts often exchanged colorful QSL cards, especially during the height of CB's popularity in the 1970s. CB radio operators who met while on the air would typically swap personalized QSL cards which featured their names ("handles") and CB callsigns. Originally, CB required a purchased license and the use of a callsign; however, when the CB craze was at its peak many people ignored this requirement and invented their own "handles".

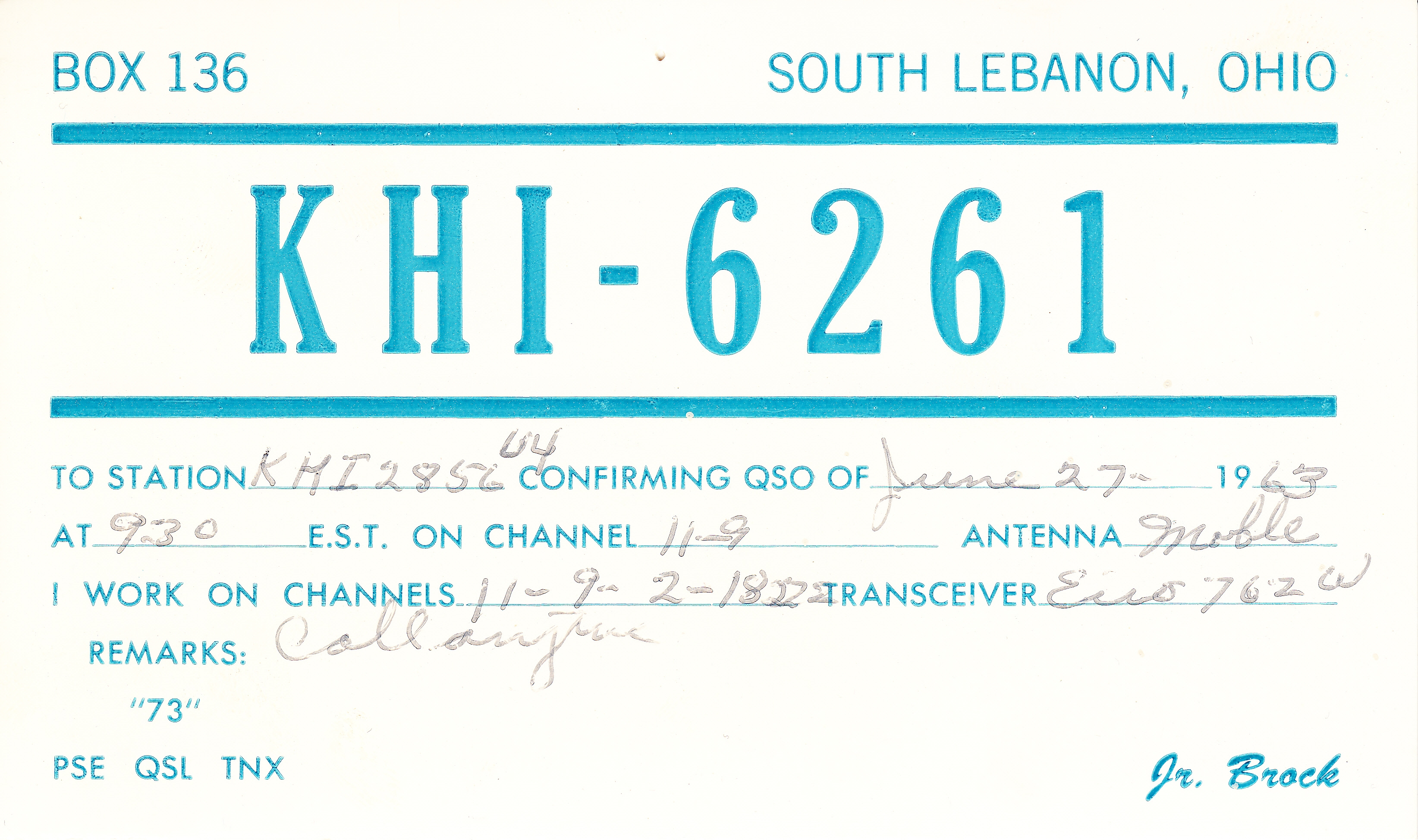
A CB radio QSL card

A simple card format might only include the user's callsign and/or "handle", home location, and note the date and time of a CB radio contact. More elaborate cards featured caricatures, cartoons, slogans and jokes, sometimes of a ribald nature. As the CB radio fad grew in the U.S. and Canada, a number of artists specializing in artwork for CB QSL cards emerged.

== Usage in TV-FM and AM DXing ==
QSL cards are also collected by radio enthusiasts who listen for distant FM radio or TV stations. With the advent of digital broadcasting there is greater difficulty with the reception of weak TV signals due to the cliff effect; however, AM broadcasting radio stations will often reply to listener reports, particularly if they report receiving them at a significant distance.

== See also ==
- DXing
- Heys Collection, a collection of QSL cards in the British Library Philatelic Collections
