= Call signs in Asia =

Radio identification in Asia

Call signs in Asia are rarely used to identify broadcast stations. In most Asian countries, broadcast stations use other forms of identification. Few countries west of the Pacific Ocean, namely Japan, South Korea, Indonesia (radio only), the Philippines and Taiwan are exceptions to this rule. Amateur radio stations in India, Pakistan, Korea and Japan are allocated call-signs.

== Amateur radio ==
The Wireless and Planning and Coordination Wing (WPC), a division of the Ministry of Communications and Information Technology, regulates amateur radio in India. Amateur radio call-signs of Pakistan are issued by the Pakistan Telecommunication Authority (PTA). The PARS operates a QSL bureau for those amateur radio operators in regular contact with amateur radio operators in other countries, and supports amateur radio operating awards and radio contests. The Pakistan Amateur Radio Society represents the interest of Pakistan amateur radio operators before national and international regulatory authorities. PARS is the national member society representing Pakistan in the International Amateur Radio Union.

In Japan, it is regulated by the Ministry of Internal Affairs and Communications with the Japan Amateur Radio League acting as a national amateur radio organization.

In South Korea call signs are regulated by the Korea Communications Commission in the Ministry of Information and Communication.

== China ==
The International Telecommunication Union has assigned China the call sign prefixes B, VR, XS, XX and 3H-3U. Only prefixes B, VR and XX are currently under active use, with all other prefixes under reserves. Domestic commercial broadcasting stations in no part of China uses alphanumeric call signs. The following call sign allocation applies only to amateur radio.

=== Mainland China ===
Mainland China uses call sign prefixes BA-BL, BR-BT, BY and BZ for routine operation, and singular B for temporary event stations. The second character for a routine operation call sign indicates the type of the station. Call signs in mainland China are now lifetime assignments, for as long as the station license is valid. It also no longer distinguish individual-owned and institution-owned stations, and no longer reflect the operator's license class. Existing call signs at the time of the rule change are grandfathered.

Prefixes	Current allocation	Pre-2013 allocation
BA	Regular stations, 5th assignment series.	Class 1 individual stations.
BB-BC	Reserved.	
BD	Regular stations, 4th assignment series.	Classes 2 and 3 individual stations.
BE-BF	Reserved.	
BG	Regular stations, 1st assignment series.	Class 4 individual stations, 1st assignment series.
BH	Regular stations, 2nd assignment series.	Class 4 individual stations, 2nd assignment series.
BI	Regular stations, 3rd assignment series.	Island stations.
BJ	Radio beacons and space-based stations.	
BK-BL	Reserved.	
BR	Repeaters.	
BS	Special stations. (BS7H)	
BT	Event stations.	
BY	No longer assigned.	Institutional stations.
BZ	Reserved.	

The separating numeral indicates the call area. It along with the first letter afterwards indicates the geographic location the station is registered in.

Call Area	Provinces
1	Beijing (B1A-B1X) and Space-based stations (BJ1)
2	Heilongjiang (B2A-B2H,) Jilin (B2I-B2P) and Liaoning (B2Q-B2X)
3	Tianjin (B3A-B3F,) Inner Mongolia (B3G-B3L,) Hebei (B3M-B3R) and Shanxi (B3S-B3X)
4	Shanghai (B4A-B4H,) Shandong (B4I-B4P) and Jiangsu (B4Q-B4X)
5	Zhejiang (B5A-B5H,) Jiangxi (B5I-B5P) and Fujian (B5Q-B5X)
6	Anhui (B6A-B6H,) Henan (B6I-B6P) and Hubei (B6Q-B6X)
7	Hunan (B7A-B7H,) Guangdong (B7I-B7P,) Guangxi (B7Q-B7X) and Hainan (B7Y)
8	Sichuan (B8A-B8F,) Chongqing (B8G-B8L,) Guizhou (B8M-B8R) and Yunnan (B8S-B8X)
9	Shaanxi (B9A-B9F,) Gansu (B9G-B9L,) Ningxia (B9M-B9R) and Qinghai (B9S-B9X)
0	Xinjiang (B0A-B0F) and Tibet (B0G-B0L)

=== Hong Kong and Macau ===
Hong Kong uses VR as its amateur radio call sign prefix. Currently only the separating numeral 2 is in use; thus all Hong Kong amateur radio stations begin with VR2. In the period of 1 July 2022 to 30 June 2023, in celebration of the 25 years of the establishment of the SAR, OFCA temporarily allows operators to use VR25 as the prefix, in addition to the usual VR2.

Macau uses XX as its amateur radio call sign prefix. Currently only the separating numeral 9 is in use; thus all Macau amateur radio stations begin with XX9.

== Indonesia ==
Radio call sign prefixes used in Indonesia:

- JZ for CB radio
- PM for radio stations in general. The PM prefix is always followed by a number determined by the province, letter "B" usually for AM and "F" usually for FM ("C" in parts of Sumatra, "D" in parts of Kalimantan), and two unique characters. These call signs are always in 6 characters. For example, PM2FGD refers to 96.7 Hitz FM, a defunct station in Jakarta province. Almost all radio stations in Jakarta shows their call sign in TuneIn streaming website. For example, all-news radio Elshinta 90.0 has call sign PM2FGZ.

Private-owned radio station call signs by region are different from amateur radio call letters. The division is based on their province area prior to 1998, so no call prefixes are assigned for newer provinces. For example, Banten has the same call number and initial letter with West Java (an em dash "—" is used to indicate provinces that were split after 1998).

Call Area	Province
0	N/A
1	N/A
2	Special Capital Region of Jakarta, West Kalimantan, Aceh, West Nusa Tenggara
3	West Java—Banten, North Sumatra, Bengkulu, East Kalimantan—North Kalimantan, East Nusa Tenggara
4	Riau—Riau Islands, Central Java, Central Kalimantan
5	West Sumatra, Special Region of Yogyakarta, South Kalimantan
6	East Java, North Sulawesi—Gorontalo (province)
7	South Sumatra—Bangka-Belitung Islands, West Kalimantan, Central Kalimantan
8	Lampung, Papua—West Papua, Bali, South Sulawesi—West Sulawesi, Southeast Sulawesi, Maluku—North Maluku
9	Central Sulawesi

- YB-YH for Amateur radio
  - YB & YE for Extra Class
  - YC & YF for Advanced Class
  - YD & YG for General Class

Call Area	Province
0	Jakarta Special Capital Region
1	West Java, Banten
2	Central Java, Special Region of Yogyakarta
3	East Java
4	Jambi, South Sumatra, Bangka-Belitung, Bengkulu, Lampung
5	West Sumatra, Riau
6	Aceh, North Sumatra
7	East Kalimantan, Central Kalimantan, South Kalimantan, West Kalimantan
8	Gorontalo, Central Sulawesi, South East Sulawesi, North Sulawesi, South Sulawesi, West Sulawesi, Maluku, North Maluku
9	Bali, East Nusa Tenggara, West Nusa Tenggara, Papua, West Papua

Call sign suffixes used in Indonesia:

  - AA - YZ
  - AAA - PZZ
  - RAA - YZZ
  - AAAA - YZZZ
  - AQA - AQZ (special license/foreigner operator)

Special License Call sign suffixes :

  - A - Z
  - ZA - ZZ Province Organization included Scout; Redcross; SAR
  - ZAA - ZZZ Regency (Local) Organization included Club Station; Scout; Redcross; SAR
  - ZAAA - ZZZZ

Television call signs are practically unknown in the country, since virtually all TV stations identify themselves with their own brands (e.g. TVRI). Many radio call signs too, are also unknown, due to the previous same reason.

== Japan ==
The Japanese station prefix for radio and television stations is JO followed by its own unique two letters; the last letter in the latter part of the callsign identifies the ownership of the station, for example the letter X indicates that it is a commercial TV station such as JOEX-TV for TV Asahi and JOCX-TV for Fuji TV while the letter R indicates that it is a commercial AM radio station such as JOKR for TBS Radio.

FM radio and TV stations have the -FM (FM radio), -TV (analog television), -DTV (digital television), -TAM (audio multiplex), -TCM (analog TV teletext multiplex), -TDM (analog TV data multiplex) and -FCM (FM radio data multiplex) suffixes after their callsigns, similar to the North American practice, except for AM radio stations.

At the greatest extent of the empire during the Second World War, another second letter was used for the empires other possessions besides the Home Islands.

- "B" for Korea
- "F" for Taiwan
- "Q" for Manchukuo and Kwantung (Kantō)

== Pakistan ==
The International Telecommunication Union has assigned Pakistan the callsigns APA through to ASZ. It has divided all countries into three regions; Pakistan is located in ITU Region 3. These regions are further divided into two competing zones, the ITU and the CQ.

The Pakistan Amateur Radio Society (PARS), a national non-profit organization for amateur radio enthusiasts, does not assigns call signs but call signs are assigned by Pakistan Telecommunication Authority (PTA). The PARS operates a QSL bureau for amateur radio operators in contact with amateur radio operators in other countries, and supports amateur radio operating awards and radio contests. The Pakistan Amateur Radio Society represents the interest of Pakistan amateur radio operators before national and international regulatory authorities. PARS is the national member society representing Pakistan in the International Amateur Radio Union.

== Philippines ==
=== Broadcast stations ===
The National Telecommunications Commission assigns the following call sign prefixes to Philippine broadcasting stations (television and radio) depending on the location of their license:

- DZ & DW for Luzon, including Palawan
- DY for the Visayas, including Palawan and Masbate; and
- DX for Mindanao

For Luzon stations, DZ is mostly assigned to licensees on the AM band, while DW is mostly the prefix on the FM band with the exemption to the rule being done in the event of a callsign suffix being already taken.

Other call sign prefixes assigned to the Philippines for television and radio stations are DU, and DV, however, these have not yet been utilized as of 2025.

Philippine radio and TV stations adapted the four-letter call sign system originally introduced when the Philippines was still a colony of the United States. Prior to independence, Philippine radio stations used call signs beginning with the letter K, as is the standard for American stations west of the Mississippi River, more specifically the KZ block. This was superseded in 1949 by the reassignment of the DU to DZ block by virtue of the ITU Radio Congress in Atlantic City, New Jersey.

=== Amateur radio ===
On amateur radio, the standard format used for Philippine callsigns is 2 × 3 – where 2 stands for the prefix letters (4D to 4I or DU to DZ), and 3 stands for the suffix letters, both of which are assigned and regulated by the National Telecommunications Commission. A suffix can have the maximum of three characters, and a minimum of one (mostly for club stations and Extra Class licensees).

For example:
DX1PAR (the callsign of the Philippine Amateur Radio Association headquarters)
DX stands for the prefix, 1 refers to the amateur radio district or region, and PAR is the suffix.

The NTC assigns prefixes depending on the privileges of the amateur licensee with the same function being done for special event callsigns:

Individual licensee classes and prefixes:

- Class A (Extra Class) – DU, 4F and 4E
- Class B (General Class) – DV and 4I
- Class C (Technician Class) – DW and 4G
- Class D (Foundation Class) – DY and 4H

Stations run by amateur radio clubs and special event callsigns are assigned the prefixes DX and DZ

The Philippines is divided into nine separate amateur radio districts. The numbers 1 to 9 on the licensee's callsign indicate the location of issuance:

- 1 – National Capital Region (Metro Manila), CALABARZON, and MIMAROPA
- 2 – Ilocos Region, Cordillera Administrative Region, and Cagayan Valley
- 3 – Central Luzon
- 4 – Bicol Region
- 5 – Eastern Visayas
- 6 – Western Visayas
- 7 – Central Visayas
- 8 – Zamboanga Peninsula and SOCCSKSARGEN
- 9 – Rest of Mindanao (Northern Mindanao, Caraga, Davao Region, and BARMM)

A special event station may also be issued a district number different from those listed above (e.g. 100).

== Taiwan ==
Taiwan uses prefixes BM-BQ and BU-BX. It too uses the separating numeral to represent the geographic location of the station.

Call Area	City and county
1	Keelung and I-lan
2	Taipei
3	Tauyuan and Hsinchu
4	Miaoli and Taichung
5	Changhua, Nantou and Yunlin
6	Chiayi and Tainan
7	Kaohsiung
8	Pingtung, Taitung and Hualien
9	Any other areas outside the Island of Taiwan or temporary station.
0	Temporary and event station.

The licensing class and type of the station is represented using the call sign's structure and prefix:

Prefix	2x1 structure	2x2 structure	2x3 structure
Non-BX	Special stations.	Class 1 stations.	Class 3 stations.
BX	Repeaters.	Class 1 stations.	Class 2 stations.

Event stations do not have to adhere to the structure and location rules.
