= Call signs in Argentina =

Call signs in Argentina are unique identifiers for communication. Call signs are regulated internationally by the ITU as well as nationally by the Comisión Nacional de Comunicaciones of the Argentine government.

== Assignments for telecommunications ==
The International Telecommunication Union has assigned Argentina the following call sign blocks for all radio communication, broadcasting or transmission:

Call sign block	
AYA–AZZ	Argentina
L2A–L9Z	Argentina
LOA–LWZ	Argentina

While not directly related to call signs, the International Telecommunication Union (ITU) further has divided all countries assigned amateur radio prefixes into three regions; Argentina is located in ITU Region 2. Argentina is assigned ITU Zone 14, and CQ zone 13.

Internally Argentina divides its regions according to the first or first-two letter(s) of the suffix, as shown in this table:

Call sign block	
LU#A, B, C	Ciudad de Buenos Aires
LU#D, E LW#D, E	Buenos Aires Province
LU#F	Santa Fe
LU#GA–GO	Chaco
LU#GP–GZ	Formosa
LU#H LW#H	Cordoba
LU#I	Misiones
LU#J	Entre Rios
LU#K	Tucuman
LU#L	Corrientes
LU#M	Mendoza
LU#N	Santiago del Estero
LU#O	Salta
LU#P	San Juan
LU#Q	San Luis
LU#R	Catamarca
LU#S	La Rioja
LU#T	Jujuy
LU#U	La Pampa
LU#V	Rio Negro
LU#W	Chubut
LU#XA–XO	Santa Cruz
LU#XP–XZ	Tierra del Fuego
LU#Y	Neuquen
LU#Z	Antarctica

== Assignments for amateur radio ==
Amateur radio or ham radio call signs are unique identifiers for the 37,000 licensed operators in Argentina. In most of the countries that have internal radio districts their Amateur radio call signs usually show where the operator is located by a number after the prefix (for example "VE3" for Ontario). Or else they have a second letter in the prefix (such as "GM" for Scotland). However, as noted above Argentina uses a somewhat different system allowing location of operators by their suffixes.

The most common prefix used for amateur radio is the LU block, with the exception of the Provinces of Buenos Aires and Cordoba that have depleted all LU licenses where operators can choose the LW prefix.

Foreign amateurs can contact the Radio Club Argentino for permission to operate in the country. The permit could be delayed by 45 working days and certified/full tracking postage is advisable since there can be long delays in the Argentine Postal service.

== History of call sign allocation ==
At the 1913 Berlin Conference the Argentine Republic was assigned the call sign block LIA–LRZ, but the block LSA–LWZ was not yet assigned. However amateur radio was not necessarily covered under this protocol.

In 1924, Argentina was assigned the single letter prefix 'R' as an informal convention to avoid confusion during trans-Atlantic radio tests.

The 1927 International Telecommunication Union Conference in Washington (D.C., USA) established further agreed upon call sign prefixes – Argentina was assigned the LOA–LVZ block and the blocks outside of these were revoked (Norway received LAA–LNZ). Once again, these blocks did not necessarily apply to amateur radio.

At the 1947 International Telecommunication Conference (Atlantic City), Argentina's 1927 block was extended to include LWA–LWZ and now included amateur radio. The block AYA–AZZ was also added.

In 1995 Argentina became a party to the International Amateur Radio Permit (IARP), which provides for the mutual recognition of amateur radio licenses issued to the citizens of the participating countries. Six other administrations are parties to the IARP: Brazil, Canada, Peru, the US, Uruguay, and Venezuela.

== See also ==
- Call signs
- Radio Club Argentino
- Ente Nacional de Comunicaciones
- ITU prefix – amateur and experimental stations
- Amateur radio license
- Call signs in South America
