= Call signs in Europe =

Call signs in Europe are not formally used for broadcast stations.

It is quite common that instead of regular call signs abbreviations of the stations' names are used (e.g. ARD, RTL in Germany, ORF in Austria, BBC and ITV in the United Kingdom, TF1 in France, etc.). In most of Europe, TV and radio stations have unique names.

== Amateur radio ==
The amateur radio call signs of Europe are allocated to ham radio stations in United Kingdom, Ireland, Russia and all other European countries. In Ireland, the Commission for Communications Regulation, known as Comreg, is responsible for providing policy on the allocation of Ireland's radio spectrum. In Russia, call signs are used to identify about 34,000 licensed amateur radio operators and are regulated internationally by the ITU as well as nationally by Ministry of Communications and Mass Media of the Russian Federation.

In the United Kingdom, call signs are used to identify 60,000 ham radio licensed operators and are managed by 'The Office of Communication', known as Ofcom. It regulates amateur radio in the country as an independent regulator and competition authority for the UK communications industries, with responsibilities across television, radio, telecommunications and wireless communications services. However, it is no longer responsible for setting and conducting amateur radio exams, which are now run by the Radio Society of Great Britain on their behalf.

== Ireland ==
Call signs in Ireland are regulated internationally by the International Telecommunication Union and nationally by the ComReg. The latter is responsible for providing policy on the allocation of Ireland's radio spectrum to support efficient, reliable and responsive wireless telecommunications and broadcasting infrastructure.

The International Telecommunication Union has assigned Ireland the EIA–EJZ call sign block for all radio communication, broadcasting or transmission. The Irish Radio Transmitters Society (IRTS) manage examinations for amateur radio licenses on behalf of Comreg, the Irish Telecommunications regulator. Membership of the IRTS is not required to sit the exam or hold a license. While not directly related to call signs, the International Telecommunication Union (ITU) further has divided all countries assigned amateur radio prefixes into three regions; Ireland is located in ITU Region 1.

Comreg issues call signs in the EI series for amateur radio stations. This allows for about 175,000 potential, 3-character suffixes to be available to licensed Irish amateurs or others under Irish jurisdiction. The EJ series is assigned for operation in the off-shore islands of Ireland. Operators assigned an EI prefix simply substitute "EJ" prefix (e.g. EI3xxx becomes EJ3xxx) when operating on an off-shore island.

There are six basic types of radio licenses that are sometimes distinguished with call signs:

Call sign class	Prefix	Numeral	Suffix format (c=numeral or letter. l=letter only)
CEPT Class 1	EI	2–9	cl (e.g. EI3cl)
CEPT Class 2	EI	2–9	ccl (e.g. EI3ccl)
Club call sign	EI	0–9	l, cl, ccl, or cccl (e.g. EI3l, EI3cl, EI3ccl, EI3cccl)
Visitors	EI	2–9	Vcl (e.g. EI3Vcl)
Special Event	EI	0–9	l, cl, ccl, cccl or ccccl (e.g. EI3l, EI3cl, EI3ccl, EI3cccl, EI3ccccl)

Call signs are issued sequentially and specific call signs cannot be requested. Automatic stations (e.g. repeaters) are issued call signs with the separating numeral identifying the band on which it works and the last letter indicating the type of transmission.

Ireland makes liberal use of numerals in the suffix to allow for special event call signs. EI25SL is an Irish call sign once used by "Welcome Slovenia to EU Special Event". The separating numeral is "2"; a "5" is first character of the suffix. Scouting Ireland used special event call signs EI100S and EI100SI during 2007 and 2008 to celebrate 100 years of Scouting internationally and 100 years of Scouting in Ireland. The Limerick Radio Club has operated as EI60LRC and EI70FOY.

== See also ==
- Amateur radio international operation
- Amateur radio license
- Call signs
- ITU prefix - amateur and experimental stations
