= Call signs in Korea =

Telecommunications identifiers

Call signs in Korea are unique identifiers for telecommunications and broadcasting on the Korean Peninsula. Call signs are regulated internationally by the ITU as well as nationally in South Korea by the Korea Ministry of Science and ICT. Not much is known outside of North Korea how amateur radio is regulated, although a foreign amateur was asked to appear before the "Radio Regulation Board" in 2002. Also, North Korea's Cultural Relations with Foreign Countries recently issued an operating permit, which was countermanded by the Ministry of Telecommunications and Posts.

== Call sign blocks for telecommunication ==
The International Telecommunication Union has assigned the Koreas the following call sign blocks for all radio communication, broadcasting or transmission:

Call sign block	
DSA–DTZ	Korea (Republic of), South Korea
D7A–D9Z	Korea (Republic of), South Korea
HLA–HLZ	Korea (Republic of), South Korea
HMA–HMZ	Democratic People's Republic of Korea (North Korea)
P5A–P9Z	Democratic People's Republic of Korea (North Korea)
6KA–6NZ	Korea (Republic of), South Korea

While not directly related to call signs, the International Telecommunication Union (ITU) further has divided all countries assigned amateur radio prefixes into three regions; The Koreas are located in ITU Region 3, ITU Zone 44 and CQ Zone 25.

== Call sign assignments for amateur radio ==
Amateur radio or ham radio call signs are unique identifiers for the over 42,000 licensed operators in South Korea with none known in North Korea.

The 1947 ITU Conference in Atlantic City, U.S.A., assigned the whole Korean peninsula the HLA–HMZ range of call sign prefixes for amateur radio use.

The Korea Communications Commission now issues call signs for amateur radio operators in the 6K (170 call signs issued), D7 (22), DS (834), and HL (3,049) series for amateur use. The HMA–HMZ and P5A–P9Z ranges are reserved for North Korea, although the only three known stations operating from there used a P5 prefix.

The Korea Contest Club special callsign of D9K is non-standard, with no separating numeral. It is on Chuja Island as part of an IOTA DXpedition.

=== Geographical prefixes ===
Call sign areas of Korea

It is unknown if North Korea assigns a separating numeral after their assigned prefix based on geographical regions. Based on the manner in which P5/4L4FN (above) signed as a foreign national, there seems to be no protocol.

South Korea assigns their prefix separating numeral according to the following geographical location:

- 0: Club or science stations
- 1: Seoul metropolitan cities
- 2: northern third (Incheon, Gyeonggi, and Gangwon)
- 3: west-central (Daejeon, Chungcheongnam-do, Chungcheongbuk-do)
- 4: south-west (Gwangju, Jeollabuk-do, Jeolanam-do, Jeju-do)
- 5: south east (Busan, Daegu, Ulsan, Gyeongsangbuk-do, Gyeongsangnam-do)
- 8: Antarctica (always HL8)
- 9: United States USFK personnel (always HL9)

Amateurs in the HL block retain their suffix no matter which call-area they live in, for instance an HL1AAA who moves to Busan automatically becomes HL5AAA. Amateurs assigned calls in the DS or 6K series do not have a unique suffix. In the case above a DS1AAA who moves to Busan must use DS1AAA/5 as there may be a separate DS5AAA assigned.

=== North Korea licensing ===
Only North Korea and Yemen do not issue amateur radio licenses to their citizens, although in both cases a limited number of foreign visitors have been permitted to obtain amateur licenses in the past. HamCall.Net lists 19 amateur stations in North Korea assigned in the P5 series, although the specific call signs themselves remain unknown. A Serbian amateur writes that he was "licensed" as P5A, but that he was not allowed to operate on either occasion he was in the country.

In 2001 and 2002, Ed Giorgadze of the Republic of Georgia operated as P5/4L4FN with the "oral permission" of North Korean authorities and was recognized by the ARRL DXCC desk as a valid operation. Giorgadze worked 3,307 U.S., 189 Canadian, 2,902 Japanese stations, and amateurs in 167 DXCC entities.

On Friday, November 22, 2002, Giorgadze was called into a meeting with the "Radio Regulation Board" without any explanation, and he was politely asked to quit all transmissions and pack all his radio equipment.

Two previous authorized amateur stations were reported as P5/OH2AM on May 14, 1995, with 20 QSOs, and one of the few, specifically North Korean call signs of P51BH (OH2BH) on April 21, 1999. The latter did an amateur radio demonstration for North Korean officials with 263 QSOs.

In 2005, The Lone Star DX Association president Michael Thomas reported that an official with North Korea's Cultural Relations with Foreign Countries committee issued a permit to operate to KA2HTV, but that the Ministry of Telecommunications and Posts withdrew permission once the operator was in the country.

A station claiming to have the call sign of P5RS7 operated in 1992, but was not in North Korea. The Ten-Ten newsletter wrote that this station was operating from over the border from North Korea in Vladivostok, Russia.

==== Unsuccessful or unverified North Korean Stations/False P5 claims ====
The 2010 edition of the Southern California DX Club newsletter lists the following as either unverified, false claims or valid claims where permission was eventually refused for foreign operators in North Korea:

- OK1DTG/P5: Josef Zabavik was with the Czech army stationed in N.K. in 1992. He claims "verbal permission" to operate and worked stations on the 40m, 20m and 15m bands. Station P51DTG was suspected of being a pirate station, unaffiliated with Zabavik.
- P5RS7: reported on December 19, 1992, claim disallowed by ARRL for ethics violations.
- HA0HW: denied operating privileges by N.K.
- JH1AJT and JH4RHF: installed a ham station at Pyongyang and lectured on the ham hobby. Forbidden to turn on the rig.
- HM0DX: was heard in 2000 calling himself "Kim", receiving hams used beam settings to locate him in Japan.
- P5/KA2HTV: medical doctor on humanitarian trip to N.K. Took ham station with him, but was denied operation permission on what was described as a "mix-up" by N.K. authorities.

=== Foreign nationals operating in South Korea ===
Amateurs holding licenses in other ITU jurisdictions can apply to the Korea Communications Commission for a one-year license to operate in South Korea. International operators must use the call sign HL#/<home call sign>; for instance an American amateur with call sign KA1AAA in the Pusan area would sign as HL5/KA1AAA. Resident foreign nationals can apply for a Korean call and are issued with a Korean call HL#Z ... The 'Z' is reserved for foreign national Korean calls.

==== US military personnel ====
United States military personnel in South Korea are prohibited from communicating with amateur radio operators in North Korea. The Commander, 1st Signal Brigade (NETCOM), is tasked with issuing amateur radio operating licences and call signs to U.S. military personnel in South Korea.

USFK personnel will operate with an HL9 call sign. Novice class operators will have an 'N' as their last suffix letter, Technician class will have a 'T' as the last suffix letter, and General class and higher will have 2x2 or 2x1 call signs.

USFK personnel are also prohibited from working mobile or from transmitters in private automobiles.

== See also ==
- Amateur radio international operation
- Call signs
- ITU prefix – amateur and experimental stations
- Amateur radio license
