= Amateur radio call signs =

Identifiers for a radio operator or station

Amateur radio call signs, also called ham radio call signs, are call signs allocated to amateur radio operators around the world. The call signs are used to legally identify the station or operator, with some countries requiring the station call sign to always be used and others allowing the operator call sign instead.

The International Telecommunication Union (ITU) allocates call sign prefixes for radio and television stations of all types. Since 1927 these have been used to uniquely identify operators and locate amateur stations within a geographical region or country of the world. Call signs meant for amateur radio follow the ITU's Article 19, specifically 19.68 and 19.69.

Prefixes are assigned internationally, and a separating numeral plus suffix are added by a national body to produce this unique identifier. These prefixes are agreed upon internationally, and are a form of country code. Each country must only assign call signs to its nationals or operators under its jurisdiction that begin with the characters allocated for use in that country or its territories.

In some countries, an operator may also select their own "vanity" call sign that conforms to local laws. Some jurisdictions require a fee to obtain such a vanity call sign; in others, such as the UK, a fee is not required and the vanity call sign may be selected when the license is applied for. The FCC in the U.S. discontinued its fee for vanity call sign applications in September 2015.

In the US, the Federal Communications Commission's authority to impose and collect fees is mandated by Congress. Effective April 19, 2022, a $35 application fee applies to new, renewal, rule waiver, and modification applications that request a new vanity call sign.

== Formation of an amateur radio call sign ==
An amateur operator's call sign is composed of a prefix, a separating numeral and a suffix.

The prefix can be composed of letters or numbers, the separating numeral is between 0 and 9, and a suffix is from one to four characters, usually letters.

Examples of call signs and their constituent parts are as follows:

Call Sign	Prefix (within ITU assigned range)	Separating numeral	Suffix	format type
K4X	K	4	X	1×1 call sign, usually time-limited special event (USA)
B2AA	B	2	AA	1×2 call sign (China)
N2ASD	N	2	ASD	1×3 call sign (United States)
A22A	A2	2	A	2×1 call sign (Botswana)
I20000X	I	2	0000X	1×5 call sign, special event (Italy)
4X4AAA	4X	4	AAA	2×3 call sign (Israel)
3DA0RS	3DA	0	RS	3×2 call sign (Eswatini)
HL1AA	HL	1	AA	2×2 call sign (South Korea)

Call signs begin with a one- two- or three-character prefix chosen from a range assigned by the ITU to the amateur's country of operation or other internationally recognized jurisdiction. This is not necessarily always the amateur's country of citizenship. An individual operator is assigned a unique call sign beginning with this prefix and then completed with a separating numeral and suffix.

Table of allocation of international call sign series
Call sign series	Allocated to	Notes
AAA-ALZ	United States of America	
AMA-AOZ	Spain	
APA-ASZ	Pakistan (Islamic Republic of)	
ATA-AWZ	India (Republic of)	
AXA-AXZ	Australia	
AYA-AZZ	Argentine Republic	
A2A-A2Z	Botswana (Republic of)	
A3A-A3Z	Tonga (Kingdom of)	
A4A-A4Z	Oman (Sultanate of)	
A5A-A5Z	Bhutan (Kingdom of)	
A6A-A6Z	United Arab Emirates	
A7A-A7Z	Qatar (State of)	
A8A-A8Z	Liberia (Republic of)	
A9A-A9Z	Bahrain (Kingdom of)	
BAA-BZZ	China (People's Republic of)	
CAA-CEZ	Chile	
CFA-CKZ	Canada	
CLA-CMZ	Cuba	
CNA-CNZ	Morocco (Kingdom of)	
COA-COZ	Cuba	
CPA-CPZ	Bolivia (Republic of)	
CQA-CUZ	Portugal	
CVA-CXZ	Uruguay (Eastern Republic of)	
CYA-CZZ	Canada	
C2A-C2Z	Nauru (Republic of)	
C3A-C3Z	Andorra (Principality of)	
C4A-C4Z	Cyprus (Republic of)	
C5A-C5Z	Gambia (Republic of the)	
C6A-C6Z	Bahamas (Commonwealth of the)	
C7A-C7Z	World Meteorological Organization	Series allocated to an international organization.
C8A-C9Z	Mozambique (Republic of)	
DAA-DRZ	Germany (Federal Republic of)	
DSA-DTZ	Korea (Republic of)	
DUA-DZZ	Philippines (Republic of the)	
D2A-D3Z	Angola (Republic of)	
D4A-D4Z	Cape Verde (Republic of)	
D5A-D5Z	Liberia (Republic of)	
D6A-D6Z	Comoros (Union of)	
D7A-D9Z	Korea (Republic of)	
EAA-EHZ	Spain	
EIA-EJZ	Ireland	
EKA-EKZ	Armenia (Republic of)	
ELA-ELZ	Liberia (Republic of)	
EMA-EOZ	Ukraine	
EPA-EQZ	Iran (Islamic Republic of)	
ERA-ERZ	Moldova (Republic of)	
ESA-ESZ	Estonia (Republic of)	
ETA-ETZ	Ethiopia (Federal Democratic Republic of)	
EUA-EWZ	Belarus (Republic of)	
EXA-EXZ	Kyrgyz Republic	
EYA-EYZ	Tajikistan (Republic of)	
EZA-EZZ	Turkmenistan	
E2A-E2Z	Thailand	
E3A-E3Z	Eritrea	
E4A-E4Z	Palestinian Authority	In response to Resolution 99 (Rev. Busan, 2014) of the Plenipotentiary Conference. (World Radiocommunication Conference 2015 (WRC-15), Geneva, Switzerland, 2–27 November 2015)
E5A-E5Z	New Zealand – Cook Islands	World Radiocommunication Conference 2007 (WRC-07), Geneva, Switzerland, 22 October – 16 November 2007
E6A-E6Z	New Zealand – Niue	World Radiocommunication Conference 2015 (WRC-15), Geneva, Switzerland, 2–27 November 2015
E7A-E7Z	Bosnia and Herzegovina	World Radiocommunication Conference 2007 (WRC-07), Geneva, Switzerland, 22 October – 16 November 2007
FAA-FZZ	France	
GAA-GZZ	United Kingdom of Great Britain and Northern Ireland	
HAA-HAZ	Hungary (Republic of)	
HBA-HBZ	Switzerland (Confederation of)	
HCA-HDZ	Ecuador	
HEA-HEZ	Switzerland (Confederation of)	
HFA-HFZ	Poland (Republic of)	
HGA-HGZ	Hungary (Republic of)	
HHA-HHZ	Haiti (Republic of)	
HIA-HIZ	Dominican Republic	
HJA-HKZ	Colombia (Republic of)	
HLA-HLZ	Korea (Republic of)	
HMA-HMZ	Democratic People's Republic of Korea	
HNA-HNZ	Iraq (Republic of)	
HOA-HPZ	Panama (Republic of)	
HQA-HRZ	Honduras (Republic of)	
HSA-HSZ	Thailand	
HTA-HTZ	Nicaragua	
HUA-HUZ	El Salvador (Republic of)	
HVA-HVZ	Vatican City State	
HWA-HYZ	France	
HZA-HZZ	Saudi Arabia (Kingdom of)	
H2A-H2Z	Cyprus (Republic of)	
H3A-H3Z	Panama (Republic of)	
H4A-H4Z	Solomon Islands	
H6A-H7Z	Nicaragua	
H8A-H9Z	Panama (Republic of)	
IAA-IZZ	Italy	
JAA-JSZ	Japan	
JTA-JVZ	Mongolia	
JWA-JXZ	Norway	
JYA-JYZ	Jordan (Hashemite Kingdom of)	
JZA-JZZ	Indonesia (Republic of)	
J2A-J2Z	Djibouti (Republic of)	
J3A-J3Z	Grenada	
J4A-J4Z	Greece	
J5A-J5Z	Guinea-Bissau (Republic of)	
J6A-J6Z	Saint Lucia	
J7A-J7Z	Dominica (Commonwealth of)	
J8A-J8Z	Saint Vincent and the Grenadines	
KAA-KZZ	United States of America	
LAA-LNZ	Norway	
LOA-LWZ	Argentine Republic	
LXA-LXZ	Luxembourg	
LYA-LYZ	Lithuania (Republic of)	
LZA-LZZ	Bulgaria (Republic of)	
L2A-L9Z	Argentine Republic	
MAA-MZZ	United Kingdom of Great Britain and Northern Ireland	
NAA-NZZ	United States of America	
OAA-OCZ	Peru	
ODA-ODZ	Lebanon	
OEA-OEZ	Austria	
OFA-OJZ	Finland	
OKA-OLZ	Czech Republic	
OMA-OMZ	Slovak Republic	
ONA-OTZ	Belgium	
OUA-OZZ	Denmark	
PAA-PIZ	Netherlands (Kingdom of the)	
PJA-PJZ	Netherlands (Kingdom of the) – Netherlands Antilles	
PKA-POZ	Indonesia (Republic of)	
PPA-PYZ	Brazil (Federative Republic of)	
PZA-PZZ	Suriname (Republic of)	
P2A-P2Z	Papua New Guinea	
P3A-P3Z	Cyprus (Republic of)	
P4A-P4Z	Netherlands (Kingdom of the) – Aruba	
P5A-P9Z	Democratic People's Republic of Korea	
RAA-RZZ	Russian Federation	
SAA-SMZ	Sweden	
SNA-SRZ	Poland (Republic of)	
SSA-SSM	Egypt (Arab Republic of)	
SSN-STZ	Sudan (Republic of the)	
SUA-SUZ	Egypt (Arab Republic of)	
SVA-SZZ	Greece	
S2A-S3Z	Bangladesh (People's Republic of)	
S5A-S5Z	Slovenia (Republic of)	
S6A-S6Z	Singapore (Republic of)	
S7A-S7Z	Seychelles (Republic of)	
S8A-S8Z	South Africa (Republic of)	
S9A-S9Z	São Tomé and Príncipe (Democratic Republic of)	
TAA-TCZ	Turkey	
TDA-TDZ	Guatemala (Republic of)	
TEA-TEZ	Costa Rica	
TFA-TFZ	Iceland	
TGA-TGZ	Guatemala (Republic of)	
THA-THZ	France	
TIA-TIZ	Costa Rica	
TJA-TJZ	Cameroon (Republic of)	
TKA-TKZ	France	
TLA-TLZ	Central African Republic	
TMA-TMZ	France	
TNA-TNZ	Congo (Republic of the)	
TOA-TQZ	France	
TRA-TRZ	Gabonese Republic	
TSA-TSZ	Tunisia	
TTA-TTZ	Chad (Republic of)	
TUA-TUZ	Côte d'Ivoire (Republic of)	
TVA-TXZ	France	
TYA-TYZ	Benin (Republic of)	
TZA-TZZ	Mali (Republic of)	
T2A-T2Z	Tuvalu	
T3A-T3Z	Kiribati (Republic of)	
T4A-T4Z	Cuba	
T5A-T5Z	Somali Democratic Republic	
T6A-T6Z	Afghanistan	
T7A-T7Z	San Marino (Republic of)	
T8A-T8Z	Palau (Republic of)	
UAA-UIZ	Russian Federation	
UJA-UMZ	Uzbekistan (Republic of)	
UNA-UQZ	Kazakhstan (Republic of)	
URA-UZZ	Ukraine	
VAA-VGZ	Canada	
VHA-VNZ	Australia	
VOA-VOZ	Canada	
VPA-VQZ	United Kingdom of Great Britain and Northern Ireland	
VRA-VRZ	China (People's Republic of) – Hong Kong	
VSA-VSZ	United Kingdom of Great Britain and Northern Ireland	
VTA-VWZ	India (Republic of)	
VXA-VYZ	Canada	
VZA-VZZ	Australia	
V2A-V2Z	Antigua and Barbuda	
V3A-V3Z	Belize	
V4A-V4Z	Saint Kitts and Nevis (Federation of)	
V5A-V5Z	Namibia (Republic of)	
V6A-V6Z	Micronesia (Federated States of)	
V7A-V7Z	Marshall Islands (Republic of the)	
V8A-V8Z	Brunei Darussalam	
WAA-WZZ	United States of America	
XAA-XIZ	Mexico	
XJA-XOZ	Canada	
XPA-XPZ	Denmark	
XQA-XRZ	Chile	
XSA-XSZ	China (People's Republic of)	
XTA-XTZ	Burkina Faso	
XUA-XUZ	Cambodia (Kingdom of)	
XVA-XVZ	Viet Nam (Socialist Republic of)	
XWA-XWZ	Lao People's Democratic Republic	
XXA-XXZ	China (People's Republic of)	World Radiocommunication Conference 2007 (WRC-07), Geneva, Switzerland, 22 October-16 November 2007
XYA-XZZ	Myanmar (Union of)	
YAA-YAZ	Afghanistan	
YBA-YHZ	Indonesia (Republic of)	
YIA-YIZ	Iraq (Republic of)	
YJA-YJZ	Vanuatu (Republic of)	
YKA-YKZ	Syrian Arab Republic	
YLA-YLZ	Latvia (Republic of)	
YMA-YMZ	Turkey	
YNA-YNZ	Nicaragua	
YOA-YRZ	Romania	
YSA-YSZ	El Salvador (Republic of)	
YTA-YUZ	Serbia (Republic of)	World Radiocommunication Conference 2007 (WRC-07), Geneva, Switzerland, 22 October-16 November 2007
YVA-YYZ	Venezuela (Bolivarian Republic of)	
Y2A-Y9Z	Germany (Federal Republic of)	
ZAA-ZAZ	Albania (Republic of)	
ZBA-ZJZ	United Kingdom of Great Britain and Northern Ireland	
ZKA-ZMZ	New Zealand	
ZNA-ZOZ	United Kingdom of Great Britain and Northern Ireland	
ZPA-ZPZ	Paraguay (Republic of)	
ZQA-ZQZ	United Kingdom of Great Britain and Northern Ireland	
ZRA-ZUZ	South Africa (Republic of)	
ZVA-ZZZ	Brazil (Federative Republic of)	
Z2A-Z2Z	Zimbabwe (Republic of)	
Z3A-Z3Z	The Former Yugoslav Republic of Macedonia	
Z8A-Z8Z	South Sudan (Republic of)	World Radiocommunication Conference 2015 (WRC-15), Geneva, Switzerland, 2–27 November 2015
2AA-2ZZ	United Kingdom of Great Britain and Northern Ireland	
3AA-3AZ	Monaco (Principality of)	
3BA-3BZ	Mauritius (Republic of)	
3CA-3CZ	Equatorial Guinea (Republic of)	
3DA-3DM	Eswatini (Kingdom of)	
3DN-3DZ	Fiji (Republic of)	
3EA-3FZ	Panama (Republic of)	
3GA-3GZ	Chile	
3HA-3UZ	China (People's Republic of)	
3VA-3VZ	Tunisia	
3WA-3WZ	Viet Nam (Socialist Republic of)	
3XA-3XZ	Guinea (Republic of)	
3YA-3YZ	Norway	
3ZA-3ZZ	Poland (Republic of)	
4AA-4CZ	Mexico	
4DA-4IZ	Philippines (Republic of the)	
4JA-4KZ	Azerbaijani Republic	
4LA-4LZ	Georgia	
4MA-4MZ	Venezuela (Bolivarian Republic of)	
4OA-4OZ	Montenegro	World Radiocommunication Conference 2007 (WRC-07), Geneva, Switzerland, 22 October-16 November 2007
4PA-4SZ	Sri Lanka (Democratic Socialist Republic of)	
4TA-4TZ	Peru	
4UA-4UZ	United Nations	Series allocated to an international organization.
4VA-4VZ	Haiti (Republic of)	
4WA-4WZ	Timor-Leste (Democratic Republic of)	World Radiocommunication Conference 2003 (WRC-03), Geneva, Switzerland, 9 June-4 July 2003
4XA-4XZ	Israel (State of)	
4YA-4YZ	International Civil Aviation Organization	Series allocated to an international organization.
4ZA-4ZZ	Israel (State of)	
5AA-5AZ	Libya	
5BA-5BZ	Cyprus (Republic of)	
5CA-5GZ	Morocco (Kingdom of)	
5HA-5IZ	Tanzania (United Republic of)	
5JA-5KZ	Colombia (Republic of)	
5LA-5MZ	Liberia (Republic of)	
5NA-5OZ	Nigeria (Federal Republic of)	
5PA-5QZ	Denmark	
5RA-5SZ	Madagascar (Republic of)	
5TA-5TZ	Mauritania (Islamic Republic of)	
5UA-5UZ	Niger (Republic of the)	
5VA-5VZ	Togolese Republic	
5WA-5WZ	Samoa (Independent State of)	
5XA-5XZ	Uganda (Republic of)	
5YA-5ZZ	Kenya (Republic of)	
6AA-6BZ	Egypt (Arab Republic of)	
6CA-6CZ	Syrian Arab Republic	
6DA-6JZ	Mexico	
6KA-6NZ	Korea (Republic of)	
6OA-6OZ	Somali Democratic Republic	
6PA-6SZ	Pakistan (Islamic Republic of)	
6TA-6UZ	Sudan (Republic of the)	
6VA-6WZ	Senegal (Republic of)	
6XA-6XZ	Madagascar (Republic of)	
6YA-6YZ	Jamaica	
6ZA-6ZZ	Liberia (Republic of)	
7AA-7IZ	Indonesia (Republic of)	
7JA-7NZ	Japan	
7OA-7OZ	Yemen (Republic of)	
7PA-7PZ	Lesotho (Kingdom of)	
7QA-7QZ	Malawi	
7RA-7RZ	Algeria (People's Democratic Republic of)	
7SA-7SZ	Sweden	
7TA-7YZ	Algeria (People's Democratic Republic of)	
7ZA-7ZZ	Saudi Arabia (Kingdom of)	
8AA-8IZ	Indonesia (Republic of)	
8JA-8NZ	Japan	
8OA-8OZ	Botswana (Republic of)	
8PA-8PZ	Barbados	
8QA-8QZ	Maldives (Republic of)	
8RA-8RZ	Guyana	
8SA-8SZ	Sweden	
8TA-8YZ	India (Republic of)	
8ZA-8ZZ	Saudi Arabia (Kingdom of)	
9AA-9AZ	Croatia (Republic of)	
9BA-9DZ	Iran (Islamic Republic of)	
9EA-9FZ	Ethiopia (Federal Democratic Republic of)	
9GA-9GZ	Ghana	
9HA-9HZ	Malta	
9IA-9JZ	Zambia (Republic of)	
9KA-9KZ	Kuwait (State of)	
9LA-9LZ	Sierra Leone	
9MA-9MZ	Malaysia	
9NA-9NZ	Nepal (Federal Democratic Republic of)	
9OA-9TZ	Democratic Republic of the Congo	
9UA-9UZ	Burundi (Republic of)	
9VA-9VZ	Singapore (Republic of)	
9WA-9WZ	Malaysia	
9XA-9XZ	Rwanda (Republic of)	
9YA-9ZZ	Trinidad and Tobago	

=== A unique international prefix ===
Beginning at the left of the call sign block, the country chooses one, two or three characters from within the range assigned by the ITU, enough to distinguish its call signs from other jurisdictions.

A "letter range" always first refers to the first letter of a block, meaning that in the letter range "AAA–ALZ", the "A" is the letter range-designator.

Factors for a country to consider when choosing within its assigned range:

- When a one-letter prefix is enough – This is possible only when the whole letter range is assigned to one jurisdiction. For example, KAA–KZZ is assigned to the United States. The U.S. Federal Communications Commission (FCC) (the American national body) can assign a single letter 'K' prefix as the US is assigned the whole 'K' block. As numbers warrant the US can also assign prefixes 'KA', 'KB', 'KC' and so forth as needed. A single-letter prefix is also possible for block ranges beginning with B (China); F (France); G, M, or 2 (United Kingdom); I (Italy); K, N, or W (USA); or R (Russia), as each are also assigned by the ITU to single jurisdictions.
  - When assigning from the KAA–KZZ block, the FCC could assign three-letter prefixes (e.g. KAA, KAB, KAC, etc.) but this produces cumbersome call signs, and one- and two-letter prefixes produce more than enough than needed as it is.
  - None of the B, F, G, I, K, M, N, R, and W ranges are issued with a numeral as a second character, so the first digit in a call in those ranges is always the separating numeral.
- When two characters are needed – Two character prefixes are needed when the letter range is divided among two or more jurisdictions. For instance, AAA–ALZ is assigned to the USA; but Spain, Pakistan, India and Australia are assigned other portions of the 'A' block, so at least two characters from the left need to be assigned by each country to produce unique call signs. Letter-number prefixes 'A2' through 'A9' are also assigned to eight other jurisdictions, so a callsign prefix with a single 'A' does not uniquely distinguish any of them.
  - South Korea has issued a special event callsign of D9K. The 'D9' is the ITU prefix for South Korea, so they have issued a call with no separating numeral.
  - Bahamas issues call signs without a separating numeral. They are assigned the C6A–C6Z block, and the '6' is part of the 2-character prefix. Examples are as found on QRZ.COM (C6AFO, C6AGB, etc.).
  - Cyprus has issued H2T as a special event call sign. Whereas Cyprus is assigned the H2A–H2Z block, there is then no numeral separator, just a one-letter suffix.
- When a three-character prefix is needed – This is an unusual situation and occurs with callsigns in the 3DA–3DZ block range. Fiji and Eswatini are assigned 3DN–3DZ and 3DA–3DM respectively, so they should choose also the third character from the left to produce unique call signs, but in practise do not.
  - Fiji has issued many call signs with a '3D' prefix and a '2' numeral separator. In theory this does not distinguish their call signs from Eswatini which is issued the 3DA–3DM block.
- This situation also could arise with the SSA-SSZ range as it is shared between Egypt (SSA-SSM) & Sudan (SSN-SSZ). However, both countries use other prefixes for amateur stations.
- Jurisdictions frequently adopt one or only a few of the prefixes allowed to them within a block-range, reserving the others for other occasions. Canada has 24 possible, two-letter prefixes from its assigned ranges, but assigns only CY, VA, VE, VO, and VY for normal operation.

=== A unique internal numeral and suffix ===
The jurisdiction then assigns a single digit (a numeral to separate prefix from suffix) as well as a suffix of from one to four characters (the last being a letter) and appends them in that order to their assigned prefixes. The resulting call sign must uniquely identify a ham radio operator within that jurisdiction.

Sometimes the prefix plus separating numeral is together referred to as the prefix.

This produces internationally recognized call signs to identify licensed operators.

== General formats ==
In general an amateur radio callsign is of one of these forms where:

- P – prefix character (letter or numeral, subject to exclusions below). Prefixes can be formed using one-letter, two-letters, a digit and a letter, a letter and a digit, or in rare cases a digit and two letters. There is no ITU allocation of digit-only prefixes. Letter-digit-letter prefixes are possible but there are no known cases of them being issued by national bodies.
- N – a single numeral which separates prefix from suffix (any digit from 0 to 9). Often a cross-hatched Ø is used for the numeral zero to distinguish it from the letter O.
- S – suffix character (letter or numeral, last character must be a letter). Digits are in practise used sparingly in suffixes and almost always for special events. This avoids confusion with separating numerals and digits in prefixes in regularly issued call signs.

Call signs almost always have one of the following forms:

- PNS, 1×1 call sign
  - usually for a special event, the prefix is always a single letter character, as is the suffix. Can only be assigned in the B, F, G, I, K, M, N, R, or W prefix range. (See discussion on the D9K call sign issued by Korea above – 'when 2 characters are needed'.)
- PPNS, 2×1 call sign
  - prefix can be letter-letter, letter-digit, or digit-letter. A call sign composed of a letter, two digits, and one-letter is always a 2×1 call sign, meaning it has a letter-digit prefix and a single-letter suffix.
  - for all letter-digit-digit-letter callsigns, if the first character is other than B, F, G, I, K, M, N, R, or W then it is a 2×1 call sign
- PNSS, 1×2 call sign
  - prefix always a letter, suffix almost always two letters to avoid confusion with 2×1 call signs.
  - As a precaution, the ITU has issued no prefixes in the B, F, G, I, K, M, N, R or W block ranges with letter-number possibilities, meaning that the first digit would have to be the separating numeral anyway.
  - for all letter-digit-digit-letter callsigns, if the first character is B, F, G, I, K, M, N, R, or W then it is a 1×2 call sign
- PNSSS, 1×3 call sign
  - these have the same precautions as 1×2 call signs to prevent confusion with 2×2 format
- PPNSS, 2×2 call sign
  - these have the same precautions as 2×1 call signs to prevent confusion with 1×3 format
  - confusion might seem to arise with letter-digit-digit-digit-letter call signs, however in that case the second digit would be the numeral separator. (see 2×1 above)
- PPNSSS, 2×3 call sign
  - by far the most common format
- PPNSSSS, 2×4 call sign, or more
  - four-character suffix (or more) assigned by some countries (e.g. Australia to designate operator class), or five or more characters for special events. In New Zealand the first character of the SSSS suffix is sometimes a digit for special events
- PPPNSS or PPPNSSS, 3×2, 3×3 or more
  - assigned when two characters of the prefix are not enough to distinguish jurisdiction (eq. Fiji 3DN–3DZ and Swaziland 3DA–3DM)

=== Suffix assignment ===
Since suffixes can also contain digits, some countries issue suffixes (usually temporarily) beginning with enough digits to produce a number, usually associated with the special event (for example the number of years, see New Zealand below).

In normal call sign assignment, if a call sign has two digits (e.g. S59DSC or 2S4LGR – PPNSSS), the first digit is almost always a prefix character (e.g. S5 indicating Slovenia, or 2M indicating Intermediate License holder in Scotland).

=== Call signs with more than one digit ===
Call signs with two (or more) digits in them can arise a number of ways. When the digits abut one another, it is important to distinguish which digit belongs to the prefix, which is the separating numeral, and which may belong to the suffix.

In every case (Bahamas being an exception), a jurisdiction assigned a letter-digit prefix by the ITU will have a second digit as their internally assigned prefix/suffix separator. An example is A33A, a Tongan call sign; the first '3' is the second character of the prefix and the second '3' is the numeral separating 'A3' from the single-letter suffix 'A'. There are no single letter prefixes allocated by the ITU with an 'A', so the first '3' must be part of the prefix.

Neither New Zealand's nor the Republic of Ireland's prefixes have numerals as prefix-characters. However, both allow a second numeral as the leading character of the suffix and is not to be confused with the sign's separating numeral. As the first character of the suffix, the two digits can be taken together; for instance, to represent a two-digit number of significance to the operator.

A New Zealand amateur who has been active for 30 years and currently is assigned call sign ZL1xxx can operate as ZL30xxx for up to three months. Technically, the '3' is the separating numeral and the '0' is the first character of the suffix.

Similarly a club with call ZL4xxx which has been established for 23 years can operate as ZL23xxx for up to three months.

The New Zealand operator substitutes their identifying separating numeral with another, so long as a second digit is added to the beginning of their normal suffix. This may result in call sign confusion in the rare case of two amateurs in differing numeral-areas also both having the same number of years of operation and suffix.

Ireland also takes advantage of the ITU standard to allow digits as suffix-characters. The Irish Radio Transmitters Society operates as EI75IRTS celebrating 75 Years of incorporation – 1932–2007.

Ofcom in Great Britain also allows numerals in special event call signs. For instance GB75RD was a special event sign for the 75th anniversary of the Reading and District Amateur radio club.

Numerous other cases of multiple numeral prefixes exist. An example occurred in 1987 when the "200" was used in place of district numbers for the many stations that celebrated the bicentennial of the U.S. Constitution.

=== Exclusions ===
The 26 letters of the English alphabet and ten digits may be used to form call signs, accented letters excluded.

Letter combinations which can be confused with distress calls or which are reserved as abbreviations for radiocommunications services are excluded (e.g. Q codes). The ITU Article 19 exclusions are those found in ITU-R M.1172. In practice, no prefix begins with the letter 'Q', but 'Q' can be the second letter (e.g. Malawi assigned the 7QA–7QZ block).

Double- or single-digit prefixes are excluded. A callsign with a leading digit in the prefix always has a second character which is a letter and in rare cases a third character which is also a letter.

Currently, no allocated prefix has 0 (zero) or 1 (one) as one of its characters as they can be confused with the letters O (Oscar) and I (India).

All ten digits from 0 to 9 are allowed to be used as a separating numeral at the discretion of national allocating bodies.

=== Secondary prefix or suffix types ===
Ancillary prefixes or suffixes further identify the location and/or operating condition of an amateur operator.

According to the Canada/United States Operating Agreement treaty amateurs from one country operating in the other sign with their home call sign, but attach the call area prefix where they are operating to their call. For instance, an amateur from British Columbia (VE7 in Canada) operating in Washington State (K7 in the USA) would amend their home-call with a trailing /K7 (e.g. VE7xxx becomes VE7xxx/K7).

Radio amateurs from countries that apply the CEPT recommendation T/R 61-01 operating as a visitor in countries that apply the same recommendation are required to use the appropriate host country's prefix before their home call sign (in the case of Peru, after the home call sign) and may use the appropriate operating suffix (see below). For instance a British (English) amateur holding a call of G3xxx operating in France would sign as F/G3xxx, a Swiss amateur operating from a car in Germany as DL/HB9xxx/m. Similar rules apply in cases when bilateral agreements on visitors licenses exist, or a visitor is permitted to operate without being assigned a local call sign.

When a country's separating numeral denotes a geographic area within, an operator from one region operating in another region can affix a secondary suffix indicating so. For instance an amateur from Queensland, Australia, operating in Tasmania can sign as VK4xxx/7 or VK4xxx/VK7.

Other secondary operating suffixes can be attached such as /P (for portable operation), or /A (for operation from an alternative location that is registered with the licensing authorities). Depending on the jurisdiction, the use of these five suffixes may be required for these types of operation. Occasionally self-assigned operating suffixes such as /QRP for operation at low power are heard. Note, the prefixes /M (for mobile operation), /AM (aeronautical mobile), /MM (maritime mobile), are not authorized because they conflict with prefixes assigned to nations (M = England, MM = Scotland, AM = Spain).

Some repeaters have automatic call sign transmission at regular intervals and use the secondary suffix /R at the call sign's end. Some jurisdictions discourage this practice on the grounds that it could be confused with an amateur from the repeater's location working portable in Russia. Some beacon stations use the self-assigned secondary suffix /B; however, as this is the ITU prefix for China, it is not authorized.

Ancillary prefix	Usage	Notes
/<digit>	VE7xxx/7	denotes operator in his/her own call area operating away from primary location (unusual /P, see below, is more common)
/P	VE7xxx/P	denotes operator in his/her own call area or country operating away from primary location (generally refers to "Portable" operations, rather than a temporary or secondary fixed site. Portable and Mobile Phone operators frequently say the word "Portable" or "Mobile" after their call sign rather than a /P - note /M is not authorized as it conflicts with the ITU prefix for England).
/<call area>	VE7xxx/6, VE7xxx/VE6	operator in another call area operating away from primary location, but within national boundary
/<call area>	VE7xxx/W7, VE7xxx/W1, VE7xxx/KL7, W7xxx/VE7, W7xxx/VE3	US or Canadian operator operating in the country other than the one in which they are licensed
<call area>/	F/G3xxx	operator in another country than that of the primary location (example is a UK operator operating in France)
/A	UR1xxx/A	operator at a secondary location registered with the licensing authorities

== Callsigns within a country ==
=== General issuing practices ===
Each national authority has some options in relation to the form of the prefix, as long as enough characters are selected starting from the left of their assigned block to produce a prefix unique to its jurisdiction.

Each country has authority over which numeral (if any) separates the prefix and suffix. The prohibition of the use of the digits 0 and 1 in land mobile stations does not apply to amateur stations. The ITU however, does not issue prefixes with either a 0 or 1 as one of the characters. Some non-standard non-ITU countries do have callsigns used for amateur radio purposes, such as 1A used by the Sovereign Order of Malta. Others are not recognised, such as 1B for Northern Cyprus.

Bahamas issues call signs without a separating numeral. They are assigned the C6A–C6Z block, and the '6' is part of the prefix. Examples are as found on QRZ.COM (C6AFO, C6AGB, etc.)

Each country’s regulator may use a different methodology to assign the prefix, number and/or suffix structure based on geographical region, state, province and/or licence class.

For instance, in India, amateur radio call-signs are issued by the Wireless Planning and Coordination Wing (WPC) according to licence grade. General Grade licence holders (formerly Advanced Grade and Grade-I) are assigned the prefix VU2, while Restricted Grade licence holders (formerly Grade-II and Grade-II Restricted) are assigned the prefix VU3. The VU3 prefix has also been granted to foreign amateur operators licensed to operate within India. As of 2011, Indian amateur radio call-signs consisted solely of letters after the numeral and could contain either two or three suffix characters. Examples of Indian amateur radio call-signs include "VU2XY" and "VU3UNE". Since 2025, additional call-sign series, including VU22–VU29 and VU32–VU39, have also been introduced to expand the available pool of Indian amateur radio call-signs.

In the United Kingdom, the telecoms regulator Ofcom allocates the number with callsigns based on licence class, which defines the power limits (and previously which bands, now an obsolete restriction) an operator may use. The licence class can be determined from the prefix and number combinations, for example, M3, M6 and M7 is a Foundation licence; M8, M9 and with a prefix of 2 are Intermediate licence; all other callsigns with a prefix G or M are Full licences. Where a callsign has only 1 letter in the suffix, the licence is a Full licence regardless of the number in the callsign.

The suffix can be from one to four characters, subject to ITU exclusions (above). On special occasions, for temporary use, administrations may authorize use of call signs with more than four suffix-characters.

=== Allocation options within a country ===
Whereas for ITU purposes the prefix does not include the separating numeral, for country purposes often the separating numeral is included when the prefix is referred to. Thus for Canada VE6 or VA6 are the prefixes for Alberta, while VE2 or VA2 are the prefixes denoting Quebec.

- The most common suffix has three characters. The ITU requires only that the last suffix-character be a letter, although with XE21 Mexico broke this rule in 1995, as did Spain in 2014 when it issued EF6 to commemorate the ascension to the throne of King Felipe VI, and Canada in 2017 with VX7150 to commemorate its 150th anniversary (the "7" indicated the operator was in British Columbia). In practice, suffixes are frequently composed of one to three letters. Portugal uses four-character suffixes for repeater stations. Long ones have also been used for commemorative events, such as Canada's VE9COAL.
- Most countries select permanent or renewable calls from a narrow, specific range of possible assigned prefix alternatives. For instance, the Philippines is allocated the DUZ–DZZ and 4DA–4IZ blocks – 12 possible two-character prefixes in all – , but almost all Philippine amateur callsigns are issued with the DU prefix.
- Some countries add or reserve an allowable second-character letter to the prefix to indicate the internal region of the operator – (e.g. G3xxx in England becomes GD3xx for the Isle of Man; or for KL6xxx, the L indicates Alaska).
- Some countries reserve their separating numeral to indicate the internal region in which the individual operator resides (e.g. the United States: 6 – California, 4 – The Southeast, 3 – Pennsylvania, Maryland, and Delaware, etc. although in the U.S. licensees can change districts and retain their original calls). Callsigns may also indicate where within a country a person is operating; thus a VE3 (Ontario) operator would add "/VE4" to the callsign when transmitting from Manitoba.
- Some countries reserve the first letter of the suffix to indicate the internal region in which the individual operator resides (e.g. Argentina assigns LU#N to Santiago del Estero where # is any numeral, or Russia where the separating numeral plus the first letter of the suffix denotes the Oblast of the call sign).
- Some countries issue call signs meant for use in Antarctica (e.g. South Korea assigns HL8 to stations at its Antarctic base).
- Some countries reserve allowable prefixes for use in space. (e.g. China reserved BJ1 prefix to all Chinese stations orbiting the Earth.)
- Canada is the only jurisdiction which issues a call sign prefix for use in international waters – VE0, although Panama has allowed "HP/" without a district number to be temporarily used by persons on cruise ships registered in that country. Similarly, Germany reserves the prefix DP for German stations that operate from outside German territory, such as DP0GVN for the German research station in Antarctica and DP0POL for the Polarstern research vessel.
- Some countries reserve allowable prefixes to indicate the operating class of the amateur (e.g. China used to issue the BA prefix to 1st class operators).
- Some countries limit two- or one-letter suffixes to operators with advanced privileges (e.g. the Republic of Georgia limits one-letter suffixes to "extra" class licenses). As noted above, beginning in 1977 this was generally the practice in the United States, and many operators holding the highest class license took 2×1 or 1×2 calls.
- Some countries reserve allowable prefixes for foreigners licensed in their jurisdiction (e.g. Japan reserves the 7J prefix for foreigners).
- Malta reserves the 9H5 prefix for VHF-use and up.
- Some countries reserve amateur radio prefixes for shortwave listeners (e.g. Germany officially does not issue DE callsigns, but the DARC association unofficially issues the DE prefix for SWLers. 'DE' is also a Morse code abbreviation amateurs use meaning "from" when one station contacts another – e.g. VE7xxx de WB4xxx means, "calling station VE7xxx from my station of WB4xxx". Thus Germany has eliminated any potential confusion in the use of DE as a prefix, as opposed to it being used as an abbreviation).
- Belarus reserves some of its prefixes for WWII veterans.
- Belarus reserves suffixes YAA–YZZ for female operators.

=== Rare ITU prefixes/DXCC Entities ===
A country can consist of many DXCC entities depending on its geographical make-up. Some islands which are separate DXCC entities are uninhabited and can only be worked when a DXpedition travels there. The following are countries and/or entities which appear perennially on various listings of rare countries:

Countries which are rarely heard, roughly in this order:

- North Korea – The ITU-issued P5 prefix is rare, as North Korea does not issue amateur radio licenses to its citizens, and very rarely to foreign nationals.
- Yemen – The ITU-issued 7O (note: letter O) prefix is rare as Yemen does not issue amateur radio licenses to its citizens, and rarely to foreign nationals.
- Eritrea – E3 prefix.
- Myanmar – XZ prefix.
- Bangladesh – S2 prefix.
- Iran – EP prefix.
- Nauru – C2 prefix, an island nation in Micronesia in the South Pacific.
- Equatorial Guinea – 3C prefix.
- Somalia – T5 prefix.
- Nepal – 9N prefix.
- Bhutan – A5 prefix.

Islands which are rarely heard DXCC entities:

- Bouvet Island – 3Y/B, uninhabited Antarctic volcanic island in the South Atlantic Ocean, Norwegian dependency.
- Navassa Island – KP1, uninhabited island in the Caribbean Sea, claimed as an unorganized unincorporated territory of the United States, Haiti also claims the island.
- Prince Edward Islands – ZS8, Antarctic islands of South Africa. The only human inhabitants of the islands are the staff of a meteorological and biological research station run by the South African National Antarctic Programme on Marion Island.
- Heard Island or Macquarie Island – VK0, Australian possession, among the most remote places on Earth between Australia and South Africa, but closer to Antarctica.
- Île Saint-Paul – FT5Z, part of the French Southern and Antarctic Lands in the Indian Ocean.
- East Timor – 4W prefix, a small country located on Timor island which is shared with Indonesia.

== Prefix reassignment ==
As political boundaries change through treaty or warfare, sometimes call sign prefixes are reassigned by the ITU to the new controlling government, or are reassigned by national governments for other reasons.

- the block range VRA–VRZ (Hong Kong) was reassigned to China from Britain in 1999 following the end of the UK's lease over the territory.
- VTA–VZZ once was a range meant for use in the British Empire – now VTA–VWZ is assigned to India, VXA–VYZ to Canada, and VZA–VZZ to Australia. Because of the influence of Great Britain throughout the Mediterranean, Middle East and Pacific regions, there have been many call sign adjustments since WWII.
- In 1947 the Soviet Union was assigned the whole U-block (UAA–UZZ). Upon the USSR's break-up in 1991 the block was reassigned – UAA–UIZ (Russian Federation), UJA–UMZ (Uzbekistan), UNA–UQZ (Kazakhstan), and URA–UZZ (Ukraine).
- prefix 8Z used to be used for the Iraq/Saudi Neutral Zone (8Z4) and the Kuwait/Saudi Neutral Zone (8Z5), both of which no longer exist so the prefixes were withdrawn.
- San Marino dropped prefix 9A and M1 and was assigned T7.
- Sikkim used to use AC3 (an American prefix) but when the country became a state of India in 1975 it adopted VU.
- East Timor under Portugal used CR8 or CR10; when part of Indonesia had the prefix YB9; and, as noted above, as the independent state of Timor-Leste has the prefix 4W. 4W (or 4W1) was formerly allocated to the Yemen Arab Republic before its 1990 merger with the People's Democratic Republic of Yemen to form the Republic of Yemen.
- The US FCC used KS4 for Swan Island but abruptly stopped issuing KS4 licenses when it was pointed out that the "commercial" Radio Swan / Radio Americas transmitters were operating without a license. Later the US dropped its disputed claim to Swan Island and Honduras began issuing HS6 calls to amateur operators on Swan Island.
- The Canal Zone in Panama used NY1, NY2, K4 or KZ5 when it was a territory of the United States, but now uses a Panama prefix based on HO or HP.
- US Military personnel in Greenland used to use prefix KG1 and XP1, but now use OX.
- Americans at Guantánamo Bay Naval Base used to use prefix NY4, now use KG4, followed by a two letter suffix (one or three letters indicate regular US callsign allocations)
- For various nations the Amateur radio call signs of Antarctica are frequently differentiated from those used in their parent countries. For example, American stations in Antarctica are assigned the prefix KC4, and suffix blocks of three letters beginning with "A" or "U".
- The Territory of New Guinea used to use VK9 and now uses P2.
- British Honduras used to use VP1 and now uses V3 as Belize.
- VX9 used to designate both Sable Island (now CY0) and St. Paul Island (now CY9) in Canada.
- YZA–YZZ and 4N–4O used to belong to Yugoslavia before its break-up in 1992, Serbia is now YT–YU and other successor countries have their own prefixes.
- Canada inherited the Dominion of Newfoundland VO prefix on April 1, 1949, when Newfoundland and Labrador joined Canada. The Canadian government continues to assign VO1 and VO2 to Newfoundland and Labrador, respectively.
- After their annexation in 1940 the Soviet Union inherited the respective prefixes of Lithuania, Latvia, and Estonia, LY, YL, and ES. Following their independence fifty years later these countries resumed these calls.
- Guinea used to use 7G until 1967 and now uses 3X.
- Andorra used to use PX (assigned to Brazil) and now uses C3 since 1970.

== Call signs used in unassigned ITU block ranges ==
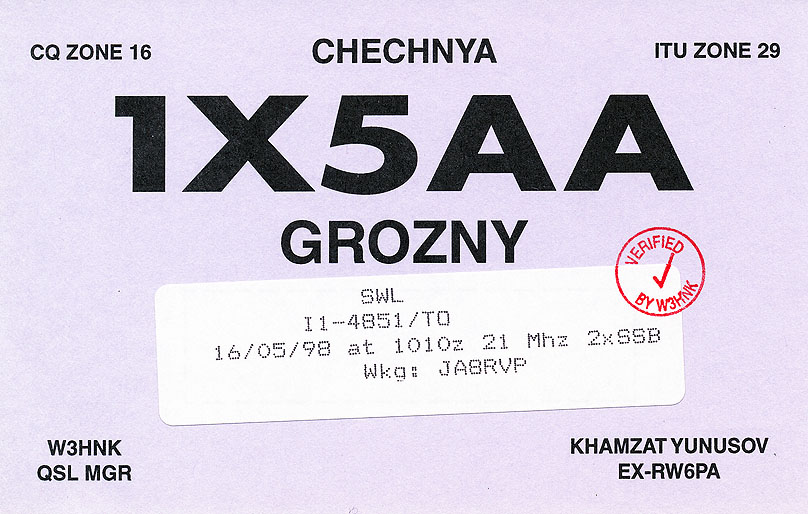
QSL card from a station in Chechnya using unofficial prefix "1X"

Some call sign block ranges are unassigned by the ITU, e.g. the 1AA–1ZZ and QAA-QZZ blocks. Any call sign used by an amateur in these unassigned block ranges usually had it assigned to them by a group with an unrecognized national claim. Unless otherwise noted, they have no value for DXCC awards, nor are they valid under UK license conditions.

- 1A is used by the Sovereign Military Order of Malta, a Roman Catholic order based in Rome, Italy. This entity is recognized by ARRL for the DXCC program.
- 1B is used by the Turkish Republic of Northern Cyprus, a de facto country recognized internationally only by Turkey, and as such this prefix has not been allocated by the ITU. (Amateurs contacting stations operating with such unofficial calls could conceivably face penalties from their national licensing authorities.)
- 1C and 1X are occasionally used by separatists in Chechnya, a federal subject of Russia.
- 1S is sometimes used on the Spratly Islands in the South China Sea, as the islands are the subject of international dispute over ownership. Without taking a position on the claims involved, this entity is recognized by ARRL for the DXCC program, although prefixes from claimant nations are often used instead.
- 1Z has been used in Kawthoolei, an unrecognized breakaway region of Myanmar.
- D0 and 1C were used in 2014, allegedly from the unrecognized Donetsk People's Republic. D1 has also been used on occasion.
- O19 was used in 2015 by an operator (Khussar Iryston) showing a license from unrecognized South Ossetia.
- S0 is a prefix used in the Western Sahara – note that the unofficial issuer has used 0 as a prefix-character contrary to ITU practice. Without taking a position on the claims involved, this entity is recognized by ARRL for the DXCC program.
- S1A is used by the Principality of Sealand six miles off the eastern shores of Britain.
- T1 has appeared as a callsign from Transnistria, a breakaway region of Moldova.
- T0, as well as 0S, 1P, and T89, have occasionally been used by operators in the Principality of Seborga, an unrecognized micronation.
- Z6 was chosen by the Telecommunications Regulatory Authority of the Republic of Kosovo as an international prefix in September 2012. The assignment is not currently approved by the ITU. However, this entity is recognized for the DXCC program.

In addition, during their period of independence from the Republic of South Africa, which lasted in some cases from 1976 to 1994, the Bantustans had prefixes not recognized by the international community. These were:

- H5 for Bophutatswana
- S4 for Ciskei
- S8 for Transkei
- T4 and V9 for Venda

== DXCC entities and IOTA ==
Amateur radio call sign prefixes almost always locate an operator within one of the 300+ DXCC entities in the world.

Any country or ITU prefix assignment can have many entities within it. For example, in the United States Hawaii (with 'H' as the second character of the prefix and '6' as the separating numeral) and Alaska (with 'L' as the second letter of the prefix) are considered different DXCC entities, as are Sable Island and St. Paul Island in Canada.

The DX Century Club (DXCC) is an amateur radio operating award given by the American Radio Relay League (ARRL) to operators making contact with 100 or more geographic entities around the world. As such, the ARRL keeps a list of DXCC entities (not necessarily a country) for this purpose. This list includes deleted entries and prefixes and the dates in which contacts with them will be counted towards the award.

The DXCC List is based upon Clinton B. DeSoto's landmark 1935 QST article defining a "country" as a discrete geographical entity. A geographical portion of one country can be a separate DXCC entity if it is an exclave or an island or group of islands significantly distant from the main part of the national entity.

IOTA is a radio amateur abbreviation for "Islands on the Air". It refers to a list of saltwater islands worldwide maintained by the Radio Society of Great Britain, which assigns a unique code to an island or group of islands, like EU-005 for Great Britain, OC-001 for Australia etc. IOTA codes are not part of the callsign, although some callsign blocks correspond uniquely to an IOTA code, like EA6: EU-004 – Balearic Islands, SV5: EU-001 – Dodecanese Islands, etc. In many other cases there is no direct relation between the callsign and the IOTA code.

== Vanity call signs ==
Individual amateurs may want a callsign with their name or initials embedded, callsigns that had been held by family members or friends, or callsigns that they themselves formerly held (and gave up for whatever reason). Some people want a callsign that is shorter, or easier to pronounce, or just "fits their personality" better. CW (Morse code) operators might want a callsign that "sounds good" or is short when sent in Morse. (This is referred to as "CW weight".)

Radio amateur clubs will sometimes request specific callsigns in memoriam of deceased members (silent keys); G5RV is held by a British club in memory of the inventor of the G5RV antenna. Some request callsigns which reflect specific interests or modes of operation (such as VE3QRP for a low-power radio club in Ontario). The USS Batfish, a museum ship in Muskogee, Oklahoma, has callsign WW2SUB; the USS Oklahoma is commemorated as WW2OK. The Battleship USS Missouri has the call sign KH6BB; VO1TAP is a callsign belonging to the Grassroots Amateur Radio Club, commemorates the anniversary of the USS Truxtun and USS Pollux Naval disaster off the coast of Newfoundland; VO1MCE the callsign of the Irish Loop Amateur Radio Club at the Myrick Wireless Interpretation Centre in Newfoundland, commemorates Cape Race Marconi station MCE as the first point of radio contact in the New World for Titanic. The National World War I Museum and Memorial, at the Liberty Memorial, in Kansas City, Missouri, has the call sign WW1USA.

Various "special event" callsigns are issued for periods ranging from a day to a month, either for individual radio contest days or commemoration of specific current or historic events. GB100MGY commemorated the 100th anniversary of the sinking of Titanic (Marconi station MGY); 2O12 and 2O12L commemorated the 2012 Olympic Games in the United Kingdom.

Occasionally, a radio club will obtain a shorter callsign for a day; the U.S. FCC issues calls as short as 1 × 1 (with "K1D" being a popular choice) for individual events. These callsigns are not permanent and are quickly reassigned to other stations for subsequent events.

A well-known short callsign is JY1, which belonged to Hussein of Jordan, who served as that nation's king.

Ham radio operators in the United States may apply for a specific callsign, including calls from other zones, so long as they have the appropriate license class for the desired callsign format. The callsign must conform to the prefix standard assigned to that area. The U.S. also ties callsigns to license class: an Amateur Extra might have W0OL (which is a "1 × 2" call), but a General-class licensee could not, because 1 × 2 calls are reserved for the Amateur Extra class. Likewise, a ham on the mainland could not get a callsign beginning with the KH6 prefix, which is assigned to Hawaii, although a radio amateur who moves to a different call sign district within the same country is able to keep his or her original callsign.

In Canada, a "2 × 3" call (a format with two letters, a number, three letters, like VE1ZZZ) may be freely requested from a list of available calls; the shorter "2 × 2" call has a waiting period in many provinces.

== Callbooks ==
- VE Callbook (Canada)
- EI Call Listings (Ireland)
- YU Callbook (Serbia)
- ZS Callbook (South Africa)

== See also ==
- Amateur radio international operation
- Call sign
- Amateur radio license
