= 3Y =

3Y or 3-Y may refer to:

- 3Y, IATA code for Kartika Airlines
- 3Y, one of several models of Toyota Y engine
- 3Y, call sign for Norway; see Amateur radio call signs of Antarctica

== See also ==
- Y3 (disambiguation)
