= Portable operation (amateur radio) =

Type of amateur radio setup

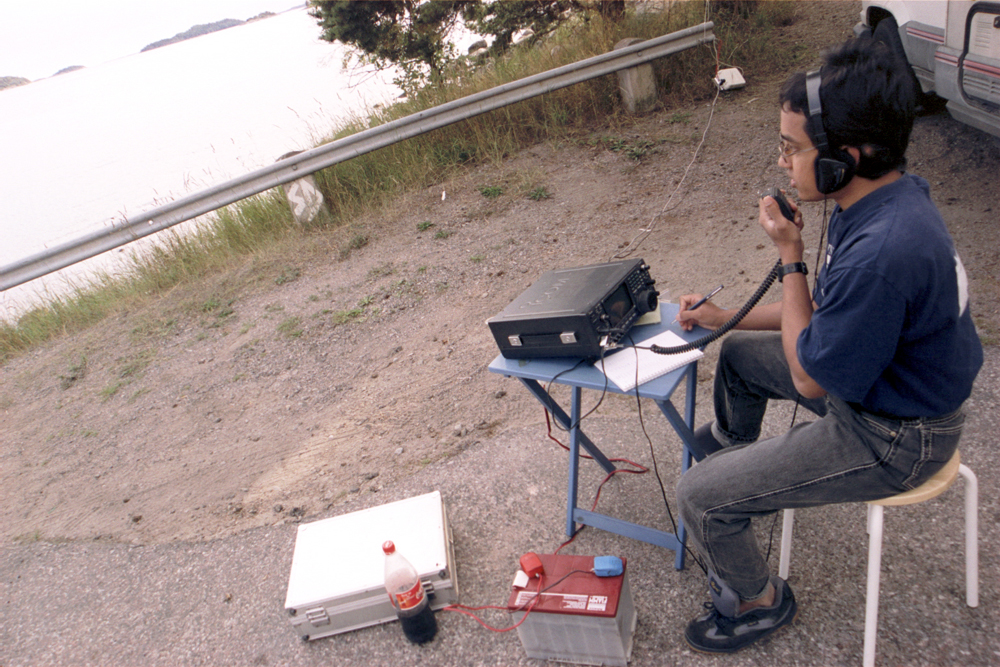
Kamal Edirisinghe, 4S7AB, from Sri Lanka, operating a portable amateur radio station south of Stockholm, Sweden

Amateur radio operators take part in portable operations using radio equipment when traveling. "Portable" equipment indicates a configuration that allows for relatively rapid collection, transportation, and deployment of amateur radio gear. A portable station can be anything from a small QRP (Low Power) radio and antenna, to a large transceiver. On long-distance expeditions, such equipment allows them to report progress, arrivals and sometimes exchange safety messages along the way.

== Portable operations ==
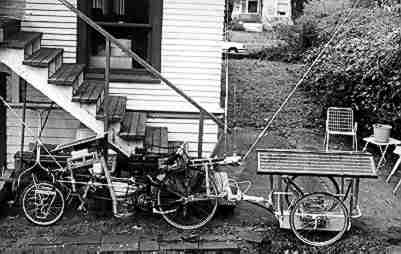
Solar-powered amateur radio station on a bicycle

'Portable' operation is usually signified by amateur radio operators appending the suffix '/P' to their callsign. Operating '/P' normally means that stations are operating away from their licensed station address.

The advantages of /P operation include the use of large empty spaces where full size beam and wire antennas can be erected on tall trailer mounted masts. If operating on VHF/UHF, this can mean a location on the top of a hill or cliff, with clear line of sight to the horizon. The main disadvantage is normally the power supply available. As normal mains grid power is unavailable, the /P operator may have to resort to batteries, portable generators, solar panels. and wind turbines.

Operating amateur radio at sea is known as 'maritime mobile', as is signified by the suffix '/MM' on the call. Operating amateur radio from a vehicle is known as 'Mobile', as is signified by the suffix '/M' on the call.

Some countries allow the direct connection of amateur transceivers to telephone lines called "phone patching". Thus, a traveler may be able to call another amateur station and, via a phone patch, speak directly with someone else by telephone.

== Applications of Portable operations ==
Amateur radio operators often apply their portable operations skills in one or more ways on their freetime and/or professionally. Some of these activities include:

=== Competition ===
- POTA (Parks On the Air) - Where operators make contacts (activate) in designated parks in order to gain points.
- WWFF (World-wide Flora and Fauna) - Operators activate protected regions, for example Natura-2000 areas.
- SOTA (Summits on the Air) - Operators activate hills and heights, such as summits of mountains.
- IOTA (Islands on the Air)
- BOTA, TOTA, MOTA, and more.

=== Preparedness ===
- Disaster communications - Many operators practice their disaster communications in order to provide relaying and other services during periods of infrastructure outages and natural disasters.

=== Public Events ===
- Marathons - Communication for heat stroke prevention, direction of emergency services, and general guidance.
