= Y3 =

Y3 can refer to:

- Vektor Y3 AGL, a South African-manufactured Automatic Grenade Launcher
- Y-3 (fashion brand), Yohji Yamamoto's fashion line with Adidas
- LNER Class Y3, a class of 0-4-0 geared steam locomotives built by Sentinel Waggon Works
- SJ Y3, a series of diesel railcars operated by Statens Järnvägar of Sweden
- Boeing Yellowstone 3, a Boeing Commercial Airplanes project to replace the 777-300 and 747 product line with advanced technology aircraft

== See also ==
- 3Y (disambiguation)
