= PUPHAM-RCG =

Philippines university-based radio station

PUPHAM RCG INC
- Formation: September 2, 1997
- Founder: Jimjay Ocampo, Dennis Flores, Dave Hernandez, Rico Soriano
- Type: non-profit organization
- Purpose: Volunteer
- Headquarters: Room 402A, 4/F PUP College of Engineering and Architecture Building, Sta Mesa, Manila 1016
- Location: Philippines
- Coordinates: 14°35′56″N 121°0′19″E
- Region served: Metro Manila
- Members: As of August 2018, 248 (Alumni), 43 (Enrolled), 24 (Probationary)
- Official language: English, Tagalog
- President: Joshua Ebalde Balmes (PH 266)
- Vice President for Internal Affairs: Lance Rovi Luana (PH 265)
- Vice President for External Affairs: Abbas Maghazehi (PH 270)
- Board of directors: Arthur Pazcoguin (PH 08), Dodgie Vivares (PH 28), Cesar Tamayo (PH 37), S. Christopher Espiritu (PH 49)
- Affiliations: Philippine Amateur Radio Association
- Staff: 43
- Volunteers: 315
- Website: puphamrcg.org
- Formerly called: Polytechnic University of the Philippines, Help Assist and Mobilize Radio Communications Group (PUPHAM_RCG)

The PUPHAM-RCG INC formerly known as Polytechnic University of the Philippines Help, Assist, Mobilize - Radio Communications Group Incorporated (PUPHAM-RCG INC) is a non-profit university-based organization engaged in university and public service through radio communications.

== History ==
PUPHAM-RCG INC has been founded by four active Polytechnic University of the Philippines students in 1997

The founders are

- Jimjay Ocampo
- Dennis Flores
- Dave Hernandez
- Rico Soriano

Their first motive was to create a communications group that in the event of disaster and emergency, it would provide assistance.

That time communication played a vital role in providing timely response. However, communication facilities failed during those critical times due to loss of power, destruction of facility or complexity of returning the facility to operational status. Since then PUPHAM-RCG have developed the expertise of pooling manpower in limited amount of time and setting up communication equipment both for land based fixed and mobile station.

== Members ==
There are three types of membership available.

- Alumni
- Enrolled Numerics
- Probationary Members (Probee)

Alumni Members are those who were previously Enrolled Numerics but has already been graduated from their course.

Enrolled Numerics Members are those who are already earned the Numeric call sign and still enrolled as a student under Polytechnic university of the Philippines. Their Call sign are starting with PH and ends with their respective Numeric call sign.

Probationary Members are those who are just joined the organisation and still under training. Their Call sign starts with PH and ends with a three alphabetical letter. Its members are identified by using their callsign starting with the prefix of "PH" meaning the initials of PUPHAM

== Advisers ==
It has Advisers which are helping and guiding the organization to be the best it can be.

As of 2023 these are the Advisers:

- Dr. Manuel M. Muhi — President, Polytechnic University of the Philippines
- Hon. Engr. Rene Tanasas — President FEDAAPI, Polytechnic University of the Philippines
- Atty. Eduardo Victor J. Valdez DU1EV — President PARA, Philippine Amateur Radio Association

Former advisers are:

- Engr. Carlos P. Luzon — Former ECE Chairperson, Polytechnic University of the Philippines College of Engineering
- Engr. Ma. Elena Noriega — Former ECE Chairperson, Polytechnic University of the Philippines College of Engineering
- Dr. Ben B. Andres — Former ECE Chairperson, Polytechnic University of the Philippines College of Engineering
- Engr. Mayra S. Fulgar
- Engr. Jose M. Untalan Jr.

== External links- ==
- http://pupham.webs.com
