= Call signs in South America =

Signs used to identify radio & TV stations in South America

Call signs in South America are used for a variety of purposes, including identifying radio and TV stations. Argentina and Brazil both have broadcast call signs systems. Some stations still broadcast their call signs a few times a day, but this practice is becoming very rare. Call signs were first assigned to South American countries in 1913, and the call sign blocks were expanded to include amateur radio in 1947.

In 1995, Brazil, Argentina, Peru, Uruguay and Venezuela signed up to the International Amateur Radio Permit agreement requiring governments to mutually recognize amateur radio licenses issued to citizens of other participating countries. Canada and the United States are also party to the agreement.

== Argentina ==
Argentinian broadcast call signs consist of two (or, more recently, three) letters followed by multiple numbers. The second letter, as used in television call signs from the 1960s, traditionally indicated the region; LS call signs were given to stations in Buenos Aires, LT in the northeastern region, LU in the southern region, LV in the central region and LW in the northwestern region. (LR was used for some radio stations, especially in Buenos Aires; the earliest radio stations in the Argentine capital had call signs of LR plus one digit.) Most TV stations had call signs with higher two-digit numbers. The five main stations in the Buenos Aires area had call signs from LS 82 to LS 86, while stations in Rosario, Santa Fe had call signs LT 83 and LT 85.

Amateur radio call signs are used to uniquely identify 37,000 licensed amateur operators in Argentina. Call signs are regulated internationally by the ITU as well as nationally by the Comisión Nacional de Comunicaciones of the Argentine government. Foreign amateurs can obtain permission to operate in the country from can contact the Radio Club Argentino.

Since 2000 or earlier, call signs beginning with LR and a third letter, as well as have been assigned,

- LRA exclusively assigned to Radio Nacional, regardless of its location, or mode of transmission.
- LRF - LRU In Tierra del Fuego, Chubut, Santa Cruz
- LRG - LRT In Neuquen, La Pampa, Rio Negro
- LRH - LRR In Chaco, Formosa, Corrientes, Misiones (but not exclusively, a tv station in Buenos Aires has been assigned with this call sign)
- LRI - LRM - LRP - LRS In Santa Fe, Buenos Aires, Entre Ríos
- LRJ - LRN - LRT in Cordoba, Mendoza, San Luis, La Rioja, San Juan
- LRK - LRQ in Salta, Jujuy, San Juan, Catamarca, Santiago del Estero
- LRL - In Ciudad Autonoma de Buenos Aires and its Metropolitan Area (but not exclusively, a station in Santa Fe has been assigned with this call sign)

For instance, LRI 486 is Canal 8 in Mar del Plata, Buenos Aires. There are other Callsigns almost unused, I.E. AYP 75 FM 99.5 MHz. in Ciudad Autonoma de Buenos Aires, and LOL Observatorio Naval (National Observatory, a time signal station which operates in Shortwave.

== Brazil ==
For more information the page Indicativo de chamada (in Portuguese) has a complete description of Brazilian call signs. For TV and radio stations the letters ZY are used, followed by one letter and three numbers. ZYA and ZYB are allocated to television stations, ZYI, ZYJ, ZYK and ZYL designate AM stations, ZYG is used for shortwave stations, ZYC, ZYD, ZYM and ZYU are given to FM stations.

For example, ZYB-883 (analog channel 18) is TV Tribuna in Santos.
