= Philippine Amateur Radio Association =

Philippine Amateur Radio Association Inc.
- Abbreviation: PARA
- Formation: 1932
- Type: non-profit organization
- Headquarters: 5th Floor, NTC Bldg., BIR Road, Diliman, Quezon City; PK04mp
- Location: Philippines
- Region served: nationwide
- Official language: English
- President: Ramon O. Purugganan, DU1CHN
- Affiliations: International Amateur Radio Union
- Website: para.org.ph

The Philippine Amateur Radio Association Inc. (PARA) is a national non-profit organization for amateur radio operators in the Philippines. Key membership benefits of PARA include the sponsorship of amateur radio operating awards and radio contests, and a QSL bureau for those members who regularly communicate with amateur radio operators in other countries. PARA represents the interests of Filipino Amateur Radio Operators before the national and international telecommunications regulatory authorities. PARA is the national member society representing the Philippines in the International Amateur Radio Union.

PARA is the recognized national umbrella association for the amateur radio service in the Philippines. The National Telecommunications Commission (NTC) - the country's telecommunications regulatory authority - issued Memorandum Circular No. 05-06-85 which says:

"In compliance to Ministry Circular No. 82-077, dated 20 October 1982, the Philippine Amateur Radio Association (PARA) as governed by the new PARA By Laws registered with the Securities and Exchange Commission, dated 08 May 1985, is hereby recognized by the National Telecommunications Commission as the national amateur radio organization. As such, PARA shall represent the Philippines Amateurs in all conferences, either local or international and with the end in view of fostering cordial relationship and efficient coordination between radio amateurs and the government.

To hasten the normal operation of the organization and the accreditation of other amateur radio clubs as required under NTC Memorandum Circular No. 01-01-84, dated 12 January 1984, every district and local clubs shall affiliate with PARA without unnecessary delay".

The recognition of PARA as the national association for the amateur radio service in the Philippines is emphasized anew NTC Memorandum Circular No. 03-08-2012, particularly Section VIII (2) which states that "The Philippine Amateur Radio Association (PARA) is the only recognized national society of amateurs."

Organizational structure

PARA elects a five-member executive board every three years. The board elect from among themselves the President, Vice President, Treasurer, Secretary and a Director

The PARA Board of Trustees for the term 2026 to 2028 are:

1. Purugganan, Ramon O., DU1CHN
2. Santos, Gil Brian, DU1MS
3. Panganiban, Bienvenido Jose, DU1BP
4. Lorenzo, Crisnick, 4F3BZ (SK)
5. Isidro, Romeo, DU1SMQ

PARA also elects its district managers to supervise affiliate clubs in the different call areas. The election is done simultaneous with the executive board. For 2026 to 2028 the following are the PARA District Directors:

1. District 1 – Dela Cruz, Custer, 4I1YVE
2. District 2 – Baroña, Dario Sol, DU2SOL
3. District 3 – Benito, Karen T. DV3KLT
4. District 4 – Toyado, Dexter, DU4DXT
5. District 5 – Jerick M. Silva, 4F5JMS
6. District 6 – Tuason, Eliseo DU6XZ
7. District 7 – Desoloc, Norman, DV7SKY
8. District 8 – Vigafracia, Raymund, DU8WIN
9. District 9 – Sauro, Emelda, DU9MIE

Membership

As the national association for amateur radio, PARA has for its members the different amateur clubs in the Philippines. Under existing NTC regulations, an amateur club can be accredited by the NTC if such club is an affiliate club of PARA.

The following is a list of affiliate clubs which have an article in the English-language Wikipedia.

District 1

- AMSAT Philippines (DX10)
- Boy Scouts of the Philippines (DX1BSP)
- Don Bosco Amateur Radio Club (DX1DBT)
- Malayan Colleges Laguna Amateur Radio Club (DX1MCL)
- Manila Girl Scout Council Amateur Radio Club (DX1MGS)
- PUPHAM-RCG PUPHAM Radio Communications Group (DX1PUP)
- Polytechnic University of the Philippines Radio Engineering Circle (DZ1PUP)
- Rizal Technological University Amateur Radio Club (DX1RTU)
- United Methodist Amateur Radio Club - Manila Episcopal Area (DX1UMC)
- University of Perpetual Help System DALTA Amateur Radio Club (UPHSD-ARC)
- University of the Philippines Engineering Radio Guild (UP-ERG)
- University of Santo Tomas Amateur Radio Club (DX1UST)
