= Islands On The Air =

Amateur radio operating award

Islands On The Air (IOTA) is an amateur radio operating award and activity program that encourages licensed operators to establish contacts with stations located on islands.

== Participation ==
The IOTA program focuses on contacts with salt-water islands as opposed to those found in lakes. With those who work to contact these stations known as island chasers. There are 1,200 groups of islands that the IOTA program recognizes, with the number of islands ranging from one to hundreds.

== See also ==
- Summits on the Air
- Parks on the Air
