= Call signs in Antarctica =

Call signs in Antarctica include a three letter region code and a series of numbers and letters.

== Assignments for telecommunications ==
Region code	Call sign	Location
ATA	CD 55	Base Presidente Eduardo Frei Montalva
ATA	CD 57	Base Presidente Eduardo Frei Montalva
ATA	LRF 374	Marambio Base
ATA	CD 61	Base Presidente Eduardo Frei Montalva
ATA	LRF 373	Esperanza Base
ATA	AFAN	McMurdo Sound

== Assignments for amateur radio ==
Amateur radio or ham radio call signs are unique identifiers for licensed operators in Antarctica. Call signs are regulated internationally by the ITU as well as nationally by governing bodies within each country who may have nationals operating in Antarctica. Call signs may also be issued by a local Antarctic authority (i.e. base commander) who chooses from a block reserved by their national body for that purpose. The Antarctic Treaty signed on December 1, 1959 (and entered into force on June 23, 1961), established the legal framework for the management of Antarctica, including allocation of amateur call signs.

The International Telecommunication Union does not assign call letter blocks to Antarctica since there is no single government there which can send delegates to ITU conferences. However, some individual countries reserve Antarctic prefixes or call letters from within their own call letter blocks as per this table. In some cases the assignment of call letters is made locally at an Antarctic base and the relevant national body is notified.

Prefixes	Country	Notes
ATA, ATN, AT0	India	unofficial allocation, as part of special event designation, see VU, below
CE9	Chile	ITU 67, 69–74; CQ 12, 13, 29, 30, 32, 38, 39
DP0, DP1, DP2	Germany	expeditionary calls, only for outside of Germany in international territories or in space, other DP numbers used in home country
ED, AO	Spain	also used in home country
EM	Ukraine	also used for special events
FT8Y	France	
HL8, DT8	South Korea	
IA0	Italy	Mario Zucchelli station, Terra Nova Bay
KC4AAx, KC4USA–KC4USZ	United States	KC4AAA–AAF for Byrd, McMurdo, Palmer ITU CQ zones 12–13, 30; KC4USA–KC4USZ for US Naval bases
LU#Z	Argentina	'#' is any numeral
LZ0	Bulgaria	also for special event stations
OA0	Peru	also for special event and club stations
OJ1	Finland	ABOA suffix. OJ9 rarely used. OJ1 also used for World Radiosport Team Championship
OR4	Belgium	Other OR4 calls have been used in home country
RI1A	Russia	usually three letter suffix in the form of Axx. In the past Russian bases used callsigns in the R1A series.
VK0	Australia	also Heard Island and Macquarie Island
VP8	United Kingdom	VP8 also used in Falkland Islands and its dependencies
VU	India	not distinctive to Antarctica, see AT above
ZL5, ZL9	New Zealand	ZL9 is for sub-Antarctic territories, operators must have permission to land before call is issued
ZS7	South Africa	
ZV0, ZX0	Brazil	for ZX0, suffixes not starting with F, S, or T
3Y	Norway	also Bouvet Island and Peter I Island
8J1	Japan	RL suffix from Syowa Station, also used for special events

== Reciprocal agreements ==
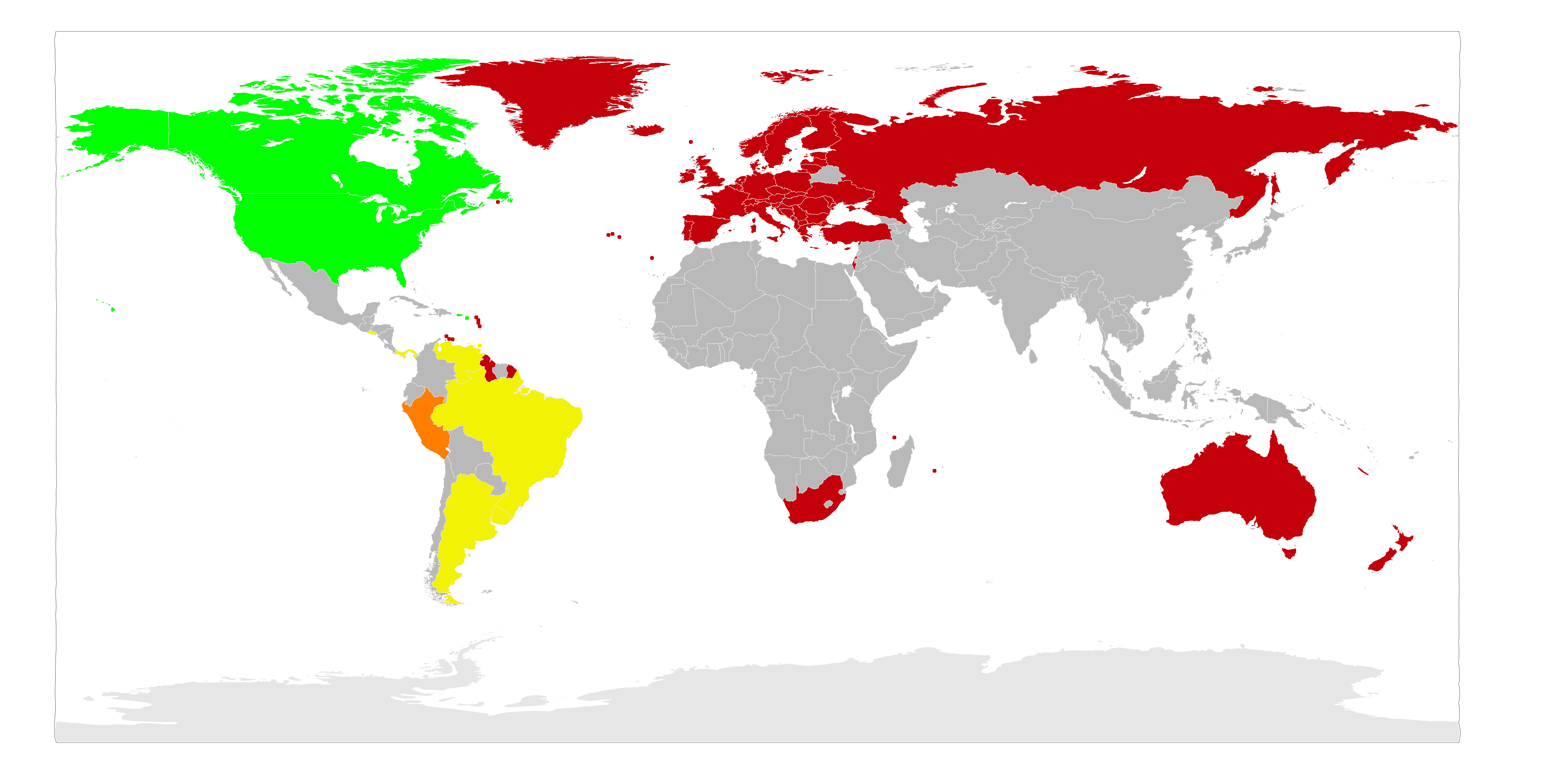
Reciprocal Agreements by Country CEPT Member Nations. IARP Member Nations. Members of CEPT and IARP. USA and Canada Treaty, CEPT and IARP.

Although Antarctica is considered international by treaty, amateur radio operators in Antarctica are often subject to the reciprocal licensing requirements pertaining to the country under which the camp is flagged.

== Special Events ==
The Worldwide Antarctic Program keeps a list of special event call signs issued from various countries at various times. TM4IPY was issued in 2007 by France to celebrate the International Polar Year as was IA0IPY, IA8IPY, IA7IPY & IP7IPY by Italy, GB4IPY by the United Kingdom, VY0ICE/VE2 in Canada, LZ07IPY in Argentina, EV5IPY in Belarus, CQ4IPY in Portugal, SN0IPY in Poland, YE2IPY in Indonesia, S50IPY in Slovenia, 5D0IPY in Morocco, and others. These callsigns were used by amateurs in their home countries.

== History of call sign allocation ==
The Worldwide Antarctic Program maintains current internet Bulletins as to call sign activity in the south polar region, including 3,100 call signs used since 1945.

- Australia – VK0 callsigns were used c. 1955 based on Antarctic treaties at the time. Before that Macquarie Island and Antarctic area call signs were known as VK1.
- United States – prior to 1959 the FCC assigned KC4USx, McMurdo still uses KC4USV. Since 1959, the FCC reserves callsigns in the block KC4AAA to KC4AAF for the National Science Foundation's use at the South Pole. South Pole uses KC4AAA and Palmer uses KC4AAC.
- India – AT0A was used in 1983 for an expedition to Antarctica, as was AT3D and AT3ANT for a similar purpose from 1994 to 1996.
- USSR – The Union of Soviet Socialist Republics assigned '4K1' as its Antarctic prefix. Upon the USSR's dissolution in 1991, this call fell within the Azerbaijani Republic's ITU allocation. It is unclear if the Azerbaijani Republic still considers it as reserved for use by Antarctic stations.

== Islands on the Air ==
The Radio Society of Great Britain assigns islands into seven world districts, including Antarctica. It assigns IOTA Groups and Reference Numbers corresponding to these areas – Antarctic Islands are AN-xxx. Some of these IOTA groups have call signs assigned by a sovereign power, others have call signs assigned according to the Antarctic Treaty. Not all of these islands fall within the Antarctic Treaty area.

IOTA #	Prefix	Location
AN-001	Various Callsigns	Graham Land West (Adelaide Island) group
AN-002	3Y	Bouvet Island
AN-003	VK0	Heard Island
AN-004	3Y	Peter 1 Island
AN-005	VK0	Macquarie Island
AN-006	Various Callsigns	Graham Land West (Biscoe Islands) group
AN-007	VP8	South Georgia Island
AN-008	Various Callsigns	South Orkney Islands
AN-009	VP8	South Sandwich Islands
AN-010	Various Callsigns	South Shetland Islands
AN-011	Various Callsigns	Ross Island group
AN-012	Various Callsigns	Graham Land West (Palmer Archipelago) grp
AN-013	Various Callsigns	Trinity Peninsula group
AN-014	Various Callsigns	Berkner Island
AN-015	Various Callsigns	Queen Maud Land (Prince Harald etc.) group
AN-016	Various Callsigns	Antarctica (Main Island Only)
AN-017	Various Callsigns	Adelie Land group
AN-018	Various Callsigns	Palmer Land West (Alexander Island) group

== See also ==
- Call Sign
- ITU prefix – amateur and experimental stations
- Amateur radio license
- Telecommunications in Antarctica
