= Amateur radio international operation =

Operating an amateur radio station in another country

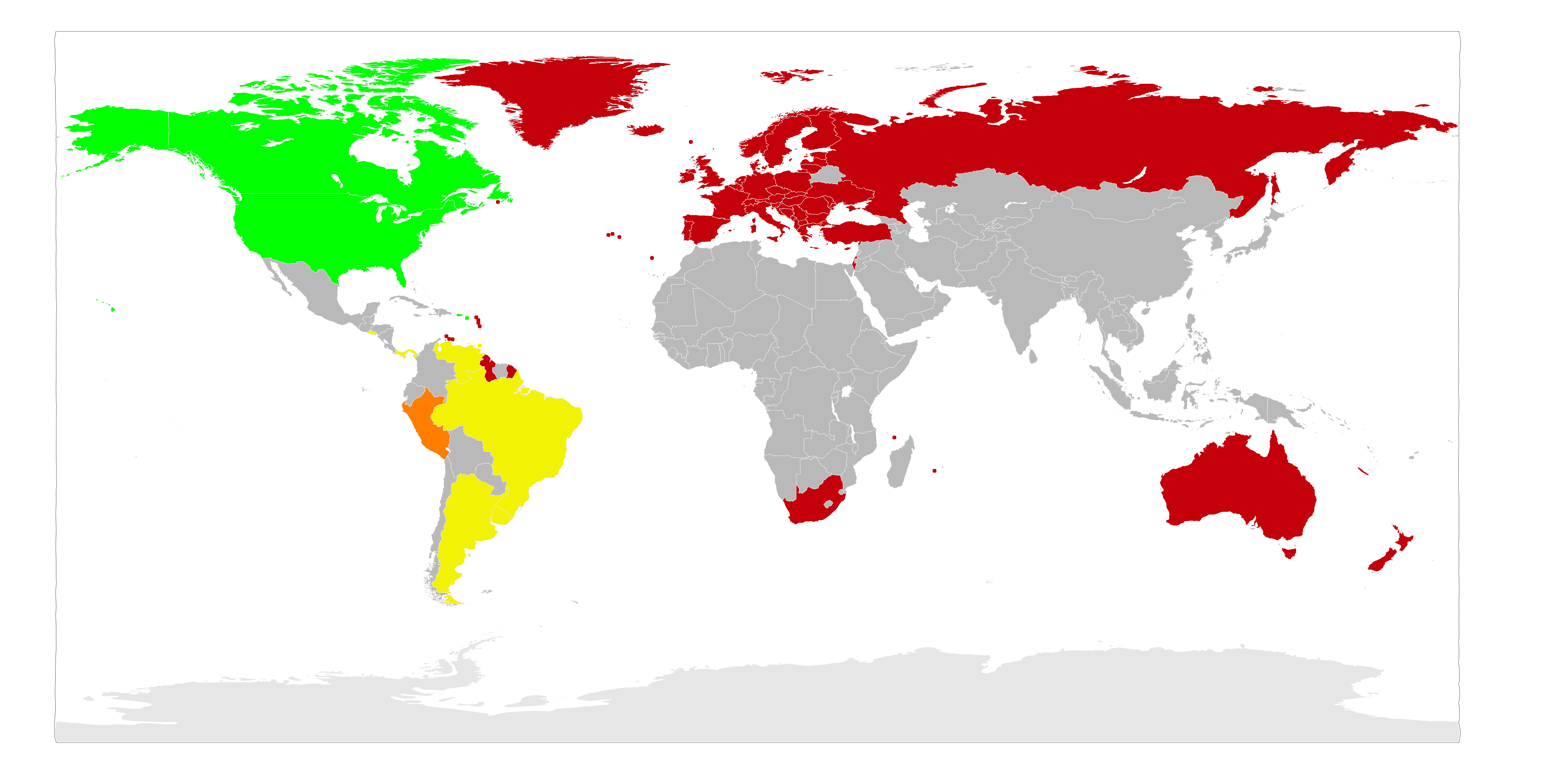
Reciprocal Agreements by Country CEPT Member Nations. IARP Member Nations. Members of CEPT and IARP. USA and Canada Treaty, CEPT and IARP.

Amateur radio international reciprocal operating agreements permit amateur radio operators (hams) from one country to operate a station whilst traveling in another without the need to obtain additional licenses or permits.

When no agreement exists between countries, amateur radio operators are often required to apply for a reciprocal operating permit or a full amateur radio license and call sign from the host country. Some countries may accept a foreign amateur radio licenses as proof of qualification in lieu of examination requirements whereas other host countries may provide unilateral reciprocal operating privileges without the need for additional licensing.

== European Conference of Postal and Telecommunications Administrations ==
=== CEPT License ===
Member Nations of the European Conference of Postal and Telecommunications Administrations (CEPT) all share the same amateur radio reciprocal licensing requirements. Amateurs are permitted to operate from most European countries without the requirement of obtaining additional licenses or permits.

The following countries outside of Europe also participate in CEPT Recommendation T/R 61-01:

- Australia
- Canada
- Israel
- Netherlands Antilles
- New Zealand
- Peru*
- South Africa
- Turkey
- United States

Peru signed CEPT Recommendation T/R 61-01 but never transferred it into national law. Operation under CEPT Recommendation T/R 61-01 is illegal and a guest operating permit is needed.

==== US and Canadian citizens visiting a CEPT Country ====
The United States and Canada currently accept CEPT licenses within areas controlled by the US Federal Communications Commission or Industry Canada respectively.

CEPT member countries accept:

- US and Canadian Advanced Class Licenses; and,
- US Amateur Extra Class Licenses.

United States licensed stations are required to carry and provide upon request:

- A US passport;
- A copy of the 2009 FCC CEPT notice; and,
- A valid FCC amateur radio license.

In Canada, "the Minister of Industry has delegated Radio Amateurs of Canada (RAC) to issue CEPT permits for Canadian licensed stations."

Canadian licensed stations are required to provide upon request:

- A Canadian passport;
- A copy of the licensee's CEPT permit; and,
- A valid Canadian amateur radio licence.

As of February 4, 2008, CEPT no longer accepts Technician or General Class Licensees for CEPT reciprocal privileges. US General Class licenses are accepted under a separate agreement as CEPT Novice licensees.

=== CEPT Novice License ===
In 2009 the Electronic Communications Committee (ECC) revised the 'CEPT Novice Radio Amateur license', a separate agreement, to include novice class reciprocal operating privileges in some CEPT countries under modified conditions. European reciprocal privileges have, at least in part, been restored to US General Class Operators as CEPT Novice Operators.

== CITEL agreement ==
=== IARP Permit ===
In 1995 the treaty creating the International Amateur Radio Permit (IARP) was ratified at a meeting of the Organization of American States in Montrouis, Haiti.

The IARP allows amateur radio operation within counties that are signatories to the treaty without the need to obtain a special license or permit, all of the counties that are a part of this treaty are located in the Americas. The Inter‑American Telecommunication Commission (CITEL) agreement allows an IARP to be issued, by a member-society of the International Amateur Radio Union (IARU).

Similar to the CEPT licenses there are distinct classes which bestow different levels of operating privileges base on the operators home licence. Class 1 requires knowledge of Morse code and allows operation of all of the amateur bands where Class 2 operating privileges do not require Morse code proficiency but limit users to bands above 30 MHz.

== The United States and Canada ==
=== Domestic Licenses ===
Map of Canadian amateur radio prefixes/suffixes

Citizens of the United States or Canada may operate in the other country as a domestically licensed station, as if their license had been issued in said country, without the requirement of obtaining any license or permission from the other government.

An American or Canadian amateur may allow third party use of his station and call sign, carry international third party traffic, serve as a temporary control operator for a repeater station, and identify themselves as a domestic station using the national call sign system, provided:

1. The Licensee has citizenship and a valid amateur radio license from the country for their residency;
2. The Licensee appends the local US/Canadian Zone (Region) to the END of their call sign when identifying their station; and,
3. The Licensee adheres to the operating powers, frequency (band) allocations, and laws pertaining to the country in which they are currently operating.

=== Foreign CEPT and IARP operators visiting the US and Canada ===
1. Must have operating privileges in the respective country.
2. Must identify with the appropriate US or Canadian Country Prefix and Zone (Region) PRIOR to their call sign.
3. Must observe restrictions concerning the third party use of their equipment.
4. Must adhere to the operating powers and frequencies of their country's license AND the country they are operating in.
5. A reciprocal agreement must be present and in good standing between the two countries.

== International Waters, Airspace and Extraterrestrial Operation ==
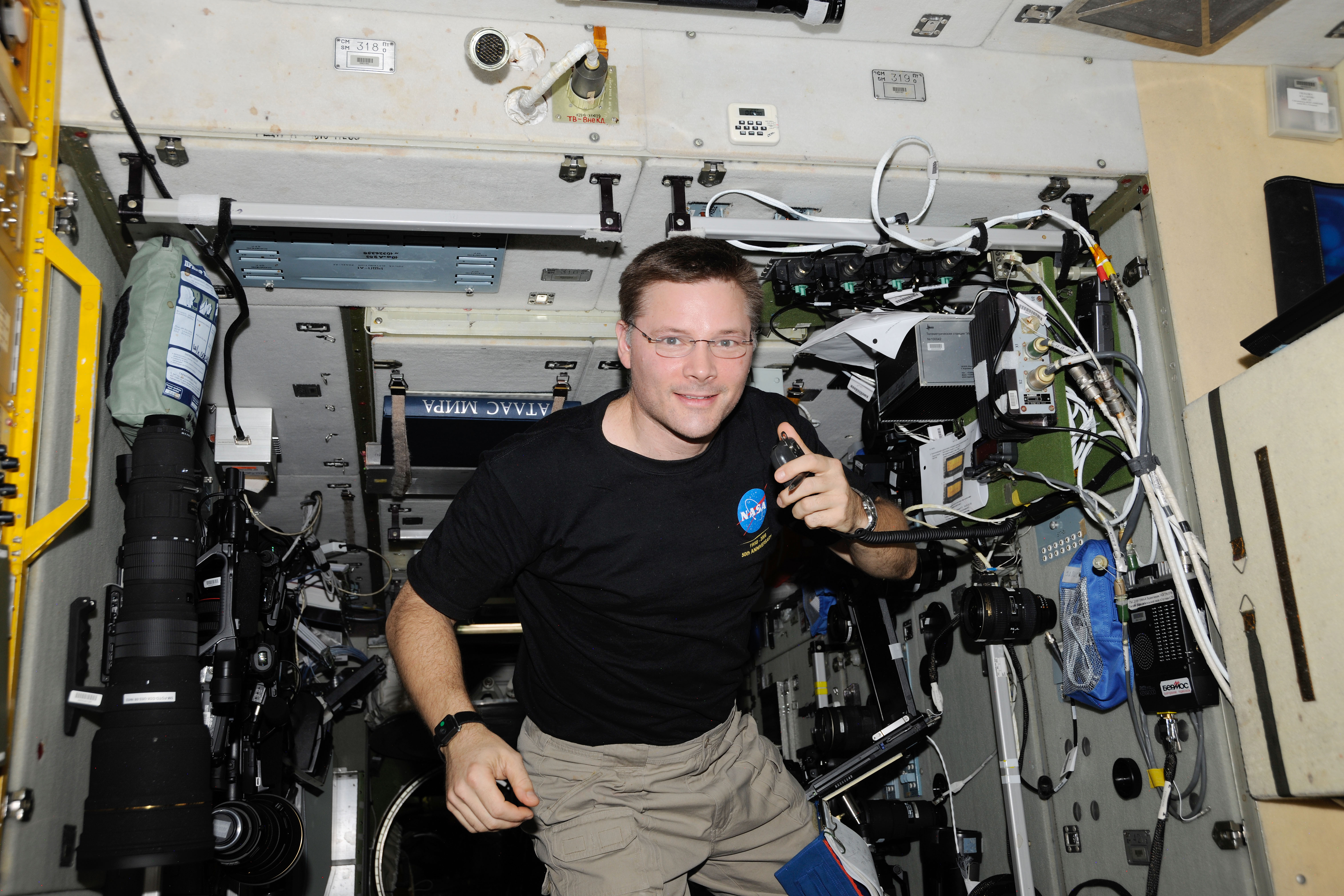
NASA astronaut Col. Doug Wheelock, KF5BOC, Expedition 24 flight engineer, operates the NA1SS ham radio station in the Zvezda Service Module of the International Space Station. Equipment is a Kenwood TM-D700E transceiver.

=== International Waters and Air Space ===
Amateur radio operators in international waters or airspace are subject to the reciprocal licensing requirements pertaining to the country under which the vessel is flagged. Permission by the vessel's captain for on-board use of amateur radio equipment is often a legal requirement.

=== Antarctica ===
Although Antarctica is considered international by treaty, Amateur radio operators in Antarctica are often subject to the reciprocal licensing requirements pertaining to the country under which the camp is flagged.

=== Extraterrestrial ===
Stations operating from space, defined as an altitude above 50 km (31 mi) above the height of the average terrain, are subject to the terms and conditions established in conjunction with their amateur license grant.

== DX-pedition ==
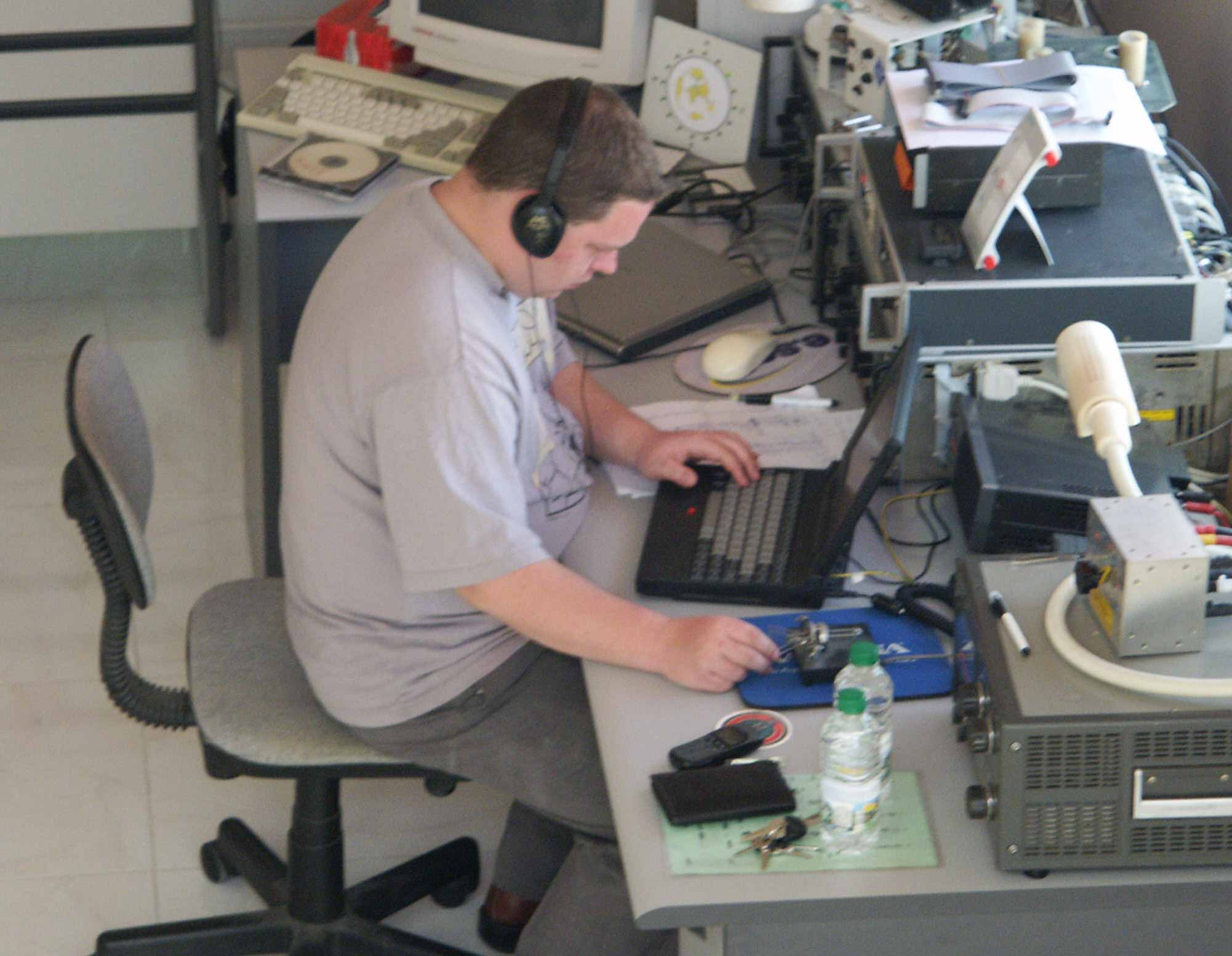
A DXer operates during a holiday DXpedition to Muscat, Oman.

A DX-pedition is an expedition to what is considered an exotic place by amateur radio operators, perhaps because of its remoteness or because there are very few radio amateurs active from that place. This could be an island, a country, or even a particular spot on a geographical grid.

The activity was pioneered by one-time ARRL president Robert W. Denniston. Mr. Denniston's 1948 DX-pedition was to the Bahamas and was called "Gon-Waki" ala Thor Heyerdahl's "Kon-Tiki" expedition the previous year. Arguably there were earlier trips where amateur radio was used that might have qualified as DX-peditions. An example is the voyage of the schooner Kaimiloa, which traveled the South Pacific in 1924. While the ship's wealthy owners enjoyed the islands an amateur radio operator kept contact with, and sent QSL cards to, experimenters in the United States.
