= Hampton, London =

Suburb of Greater London, England

Coordinates: 51.422°N 0.367°W

Hampton
- Suburb
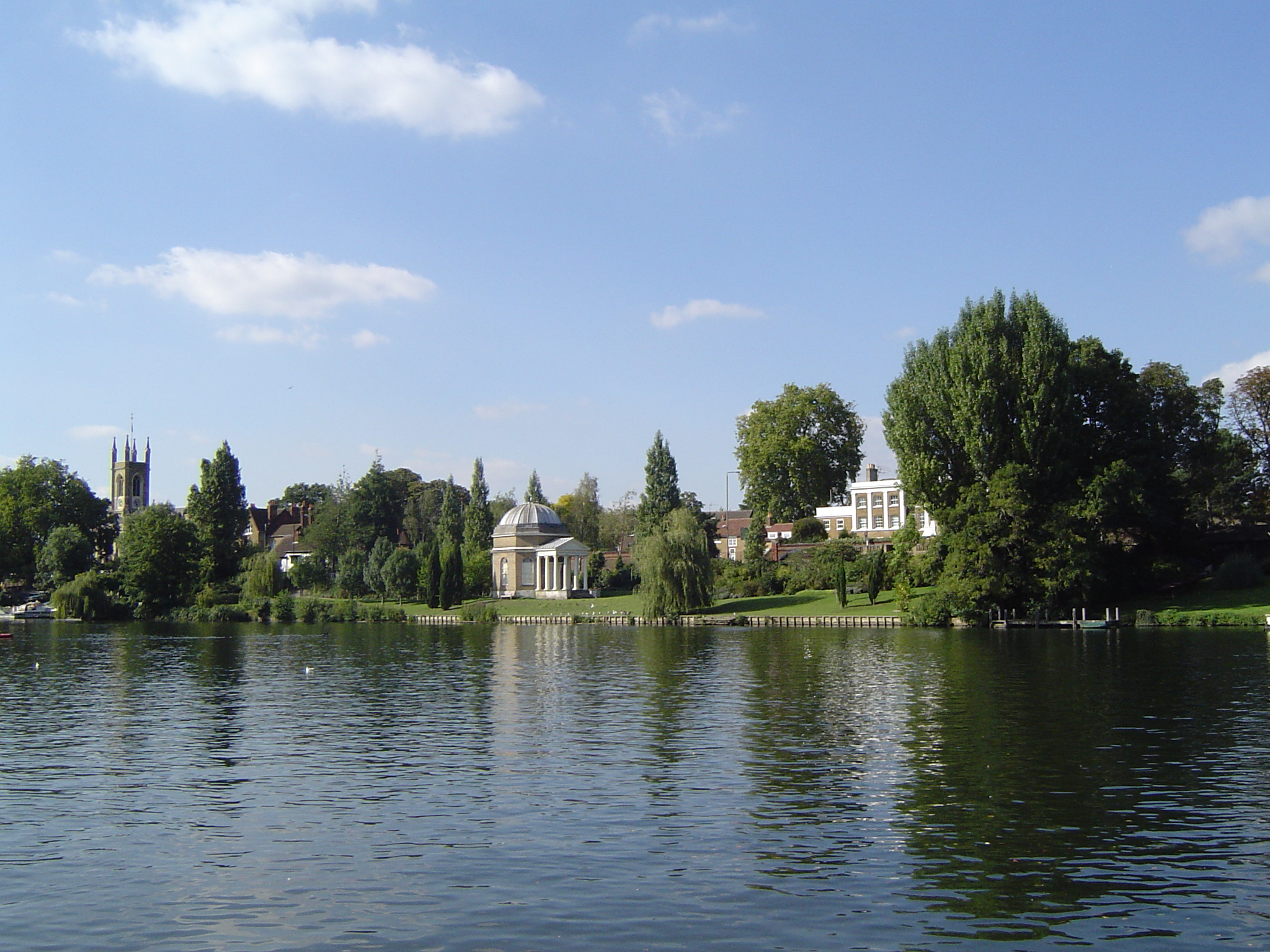
- The River Thames at Hampton

- Location within Greater London
- Area: 8.83 km^{2} (3.41 sq mi)
- Population: 20,000
  - Density: 2,265/km^{2} (5,870/sq mi)
- OS grid reference: TQ135705
- London borough: Richmond
- Ceremonial county: Greater London
- Region: London
- Country: England
- Sovereign state: United Kingdom
- Post town: HAMPTON
- Postcode district: TW12
- Dialling code: 020
- Police: Metropolitan
- Fire: London
- Ambulance: London
- UK Parliament: Twickenham
- London Assembly: South West

Hampton is a suburb of Greater London on the north bank of the River Thames, in the London Borough of Richmond upon Thames, England, and the historic county of Middlesex. Hampton is bounded by Bushy Park to the east (and to the north of St Albans Riverside facing Tagg's Island), the suburbs of Hampton Hill and Fulwell to the north, green belt to the west, and the Thames to the south.

Historically, the manor of Hampton included Hampton Court Palace (and Bushy Park), Hampton Hill, and Hampton Wick (which are now known collectively as "The Hamptons"). Originally settled in Saxon times, the manor was awarded to the Norman lord Walter of Saint-Valéry following the 1066 Norman Conquest, passed by his heirs to the Order of Knights of the Hospital of Saint John of Jerusalem in 1237, and acquired by Henry VIII following the Act of Supremacy 1534 (26 Hen. 8. c. 1). The enclosure of common land in 1811 and rapid growth of 19th-century London saw agricultural fields converted to market gardens, and later nurseries. The construction of the Hampton Water Treatment Works in the late 1850s and early 1860s, and the opening of the Shepperton Branch Line to London Waterloo in 1864, led to a steady growth in the population of Hampton, and fields in south Hampton near the station being converted to suburban housing in the late 19th century and interwar period. Refrigeration, air freight and cheaper overseas labour ultimately rendered the market gardens and nurseries uncompetitive and derelict, and after a lengthy planning process the Nurserylands estate was established in north Hampton in the 1980s.

Today Hampton is a primarily residential suburb of Greater London. The population at the 2021 census was 27,307 (20,000 excluding Hampton Hill). (Note: To give a consistent basis for UK Census information (post-1801), references to 'Hampton' conform to the area comprising modern day Hampton, Hampton North / Nurserylands, and Hampton Hill (excl Fulwell). This allows for comparison across different Censuses using the geographical areas and statistical series shown below. 2021: Hampton (E02000806), Hampton North (E02000803), Hampton Hiill (E02000802) – TS001 "Number of usual residents in households and communal establishments" 2011: Hampton (E02000806), Hampton North (E02000803), Hampton Hiill (E02000802) – KS101EW – "Usual resident population" 2001: Hampton (E02000806), Hampton North (E02000803), Hampton Hiill (E02000802) – KS101 – "Usual resident population" 1991: Hampton (01BDFF), Hampton North (O1BDFH), Hampton Hill (O1BDFG) – Small area statistics- Frozen wards – "Permanent residents" 1981: Hampton, Hampton Nursery, Hampton Hill – Small area statistics- Frozen wards – "All permanent residents" 1931, 1921, 1911: Hampton UD (Urban District) Accessible via https://www.nomisweb.co.uk/ (accessed 10 December 2023) For Censuses 1801–1901, Hampton CP/AP (Parish-level unit) is used. Accessible via https://www.visionofbritain.org.uk/unit/10184137/cube/TOT_POP (accessed 10 December 2023). Hampton Wick is excluded from all series as there is no consistent basis for comparison and its current geographic definition (E02000805) includes Teddington's eastern half.)

== History ==
=== Pre-history ===
The River Thames was displaced southwards to its present course through Berkshire and London following the Anglian glaciation c. 450,000 BCE. The local geology comprises Kempton Park Gravel above London Clay, on which the Thames deposits fertile, well-drained alluvial soils, making it an attractive area for human habitation and settlement.

There is evidence of small hunter-gatherer communities in the Thames Valley in the Palaeolithic period, who would have hunted migrating animal herds (reindeer and horse) depending on seasonal conditions. Hand-axes and a flint from that era have been recovered from sites in Hampton, indicating the presence of human activity as early as the Wolstonian Stage.

The resettlement of Britain following the Last Glacial Maximum and the start of the Holocene is evidenced in Hampton and surrounding areas by the artefacts (predominantly flintwork) of Mesolithic hunter-gatherers, who would have favoured the diversity of habitats and food resources offered by rivers and their floodplains for settlement and resource procurement. Three Mesolitihic tranchet axes were discovered during construction of the Hampton Waterworks.

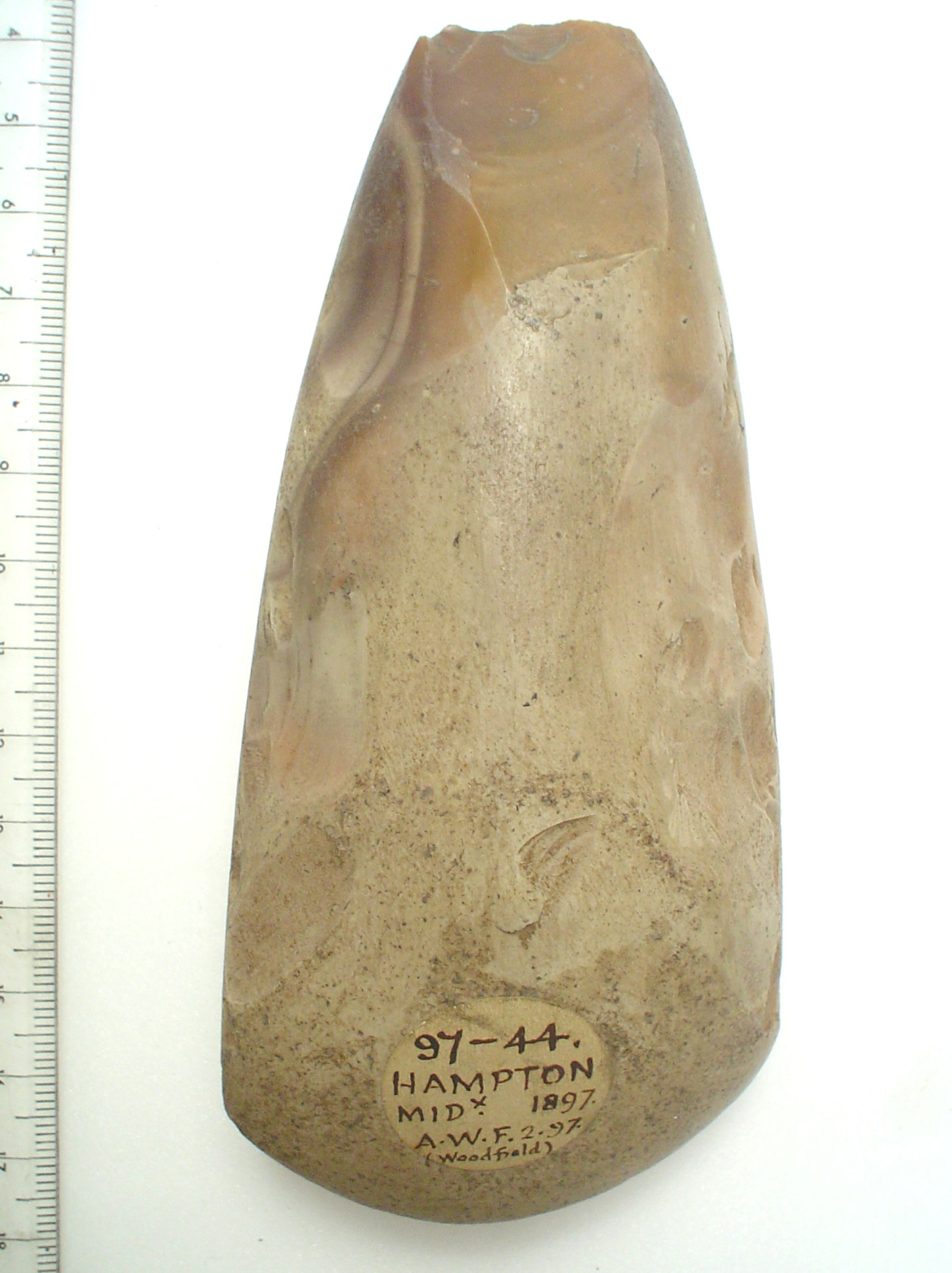
Neolithic flint hand axe, discovered Hampton 1897

Evidence of Neolithic and Bronze Age settlement activity in the area is widespread, during a period when the level of the River Thames would have been significantly lower than at present. Finds on Garrick's Ait (Neolithic stone axe), Hurst Park (Neolithic pits), and Platt's Eyot (early Bronze Age axe); and the excavation in 1854 of a significant Bronze Age barrow in Bushy Park (containing the cremated remains and offerings of a local chieftain) indicate the transition to settled agriculture.

Before the Roman invasion of Britain, the Hampton area was occupied by the Catuvellauni, a Celtic tribe with its centre of government at Watamestede, near modern-day St Albans. There is little archaeological evidence of Roman activity in the Hampton area (which was concentrated around the river crossing at Kingston-upon-Thames), except for a small collection of finds at Hampton Hill, a corn drier in Hurst Park, and field boundaries laid out to Roman proportions in what would become Bushy Park.

=== Anglo-Saxon Hampton and the Norman Conquest ===
Following the end of Roman rule the Hampton area would have been on the fringes of the Anglo-Saxon Kingdom of Mercia, in territory which came to be known as Middlesex. The settlement of Hampton first developed under the Saxons, centred on a village clustered around the intersection of the Windsor-Kingston road running east–west along the river with the road north to Twickenham, around the hillock on which St Mary's Church stands. (Note: The modern-day triangle of Thames Street, Church Street and High Street. See Sheaf (2015), pp. 33, 44) The Anglo-Saxon parish of Hampton included the area comprising present-day Hampton, Hampton Hill, Hampton Wick, Bushy Park, parts of Teddington, and Hampton Court.

The Hampton settlement developed under the manorial system (where tenant serfs work the arable farm and grazing land of the manor on behalf of the absentee lord) as an agricultural domain primarily supporting neighbouring Kingston, which by the 9th century was a significant royal estate. (Note: Kingston was the site of a Church Synod held in 838 attended by Ecgberht, King of Wessex and his son Æthelwulf, and hosted the consecration of Æthelstan in 925 (as well as later Saxon Kings).) Bushy Park shows extensive use of the ridge and farrow system of agriculture introduced by the Saxons. The 1086 Domesday Book records that prior to the Norman Conquest the Manor of Hampton belonged to Aelfgar, Earl of Mercia, but indicated that, as Aelfgar had not passed his lands to his son Edwin upon his death in 1062, they were instead held by King Harold at the time of the Norman Invasion. (Note: Thurley (2003) suggests that its proximity to the royal centre of Kingston, and falling under royal ownership immediately prior to the Norman conquest, are early indicators of the royal influence on the Manor, leading to the ultimate appropriation of Hampton Court by Henry VIII. See pp. 1–2.)

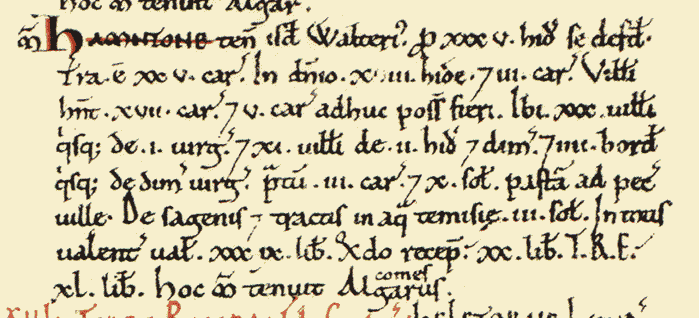
Entry for Hamntone in the Domesday Book (1086)

The name Hampton may come from the Anglo-Saxon words hamm meaning an enclosure in the bend of a river and ton meaning farmstead or settlement. (Note: Gover et al (1942) records 12th century references to Hantune and Hantona. Hampton appears settled by the 13th century. See also Garside (1951), p. 57) Hamntone is recorded in the Domesday Book, (Note: Teddington was recorded under the Hamntone entry.) the entry listing 41 villagers and 4 smallholders (accounting for households comprising ~200 individuals) occupying 35 hides, each comprising the area that could be ploughed by eight oxen in a year (~120 acres, or ~4,200 acres total). The demesne (lands belonging to the lord of the manor) comprised 18 hides tilled by only 3 ploughs, indicating it was used mostly for sheep pasture. The other 17 villanes (hides leased to serfs) each had a plough, suggesting cultivation. The entry also recorded a substantial meadow (for the provision of hay for plough animals) and a significant fishery. (Note: Literal translation: "Manor. The same Walter holds Hamntone. It was assessed for thirty-five hides. The land is twenty-five carucates. In the demesne there are eighteen hides and three ploughs. The villanes have seventeen ploughs, and five ploughs more could be made. There are thirty villanes each with one virgate and eleven villanes with two hides and a half, and four bordars each with half a virgate. Meadow for [the teams of] three ploughs, and [rendering] ten shillings. Pasture for the cattle of the vill. From seins and drag-nets in the water of the Thames three shillings. With all its profits it is worth thirty-nine pounds; in the time of King Edward forty pounds. Earl Algar held this Manor.")

The Domesday Book records the total annual value of the estate in 1086 (used to calculate how much tax the lord should be charged) as 39 pounds. The assessed 1086 value was 9 pounds less than prior to the conquest, attributed to the devastation caused by Norman forces on their circuitous route around London as they sought its subjugation.

After the Conquest the Manors of Hampton and Isleworth (comprising the hundred of Hounslow) were granted to Walter of Saint-Valéry, from whose home town in Flanders, Saint Valery-sur-Somme, William had sailed in 1066. (Note: Walter St Valery and William the Conqueror were also related: Walter's grandmother was William's aunt. See Herbert Fowler, p. 17) Walter probably never resided in Middlesex, and he and his heirs were active participants in the First and Second Crusades. In 1189 the estate passed to Thomas de St Valerie, who, as a baron in the "extraordinarily difficult" position of holding large possessions on both sides of the English Channel in the time of Magna Carta and the rebellion against King John, appears to have taken the precaution of severing the two holdings—transferring the Manor of Hampton to Henry de St Albans, a London merchant, and the Manor of Isleworth to his daughter Annora's husband, Robert III of Dreux—at some point before the 1217 Battle of Lincoln (in which he was implicated and ultimately exiled). The Manor of Hampton transferred from the hundred of Hounslow to that of Spelthorne in the late 12th or early 13th century.

=== Medieval Hampton and the Knights Hospitaller ===
The Manor was acquired in 1237 by the Order of Knights of the Hospital of Saint John of Jerusalem (known as the Knights Hospitaller). A Benedictine order charged with the care and defence of the Holy Land, (Note: The precursor to the modern Order of St John.) the Knights Hospitaller operated from headquarters on Rhodes, using their holdings in England (received via bequests from returning Crusaders) to fund their operations. The Order became established in Hampton around 1180 (Note: A "Sister Joan" (or "Johanna") from "Hamton in Middlesex" was among the sisters of the Knight Hospitallers ordered removed from their commanderies on the order of King John to Mynchin Buckland Priory in Somersetshire in 1180. See also "Houses of Knights Hospitallers: The preceptory of Minchin Buckland," in A History of the County of Somerset: Volume 2, ed. William Page (London: Victoria County History, 1911), 148–150. British History Online, accessed 10 December 2023, http://www.british-history.ac.uk/vch/som/vol2/pp148-150.) (probably by a gift from Reginald St Valery (Note: Walter St Valery's son, Henry II's Steward and Justicar of Normandy. See Thurley (2003), p. 3, and Haskins, Charles H. "The Government of Normandy Under Henry II". The American Historical Review 20, no. 1 (1914): 33–34. https://doi.org/10.2307/1836115.)), and by 1237 owned a house and sheep pasture on the site of present-day Hampton Court Palace. In 1338, the Order commissioned a financial survey of its possessions in England, which showed the Manor of Hampton comprising 800 acres of demesne (rented arable land), 40 acres of meadow by the Thames, pasture for 24 oxen, 18 cows, 10 store cattle and 2000 sheep, a fish weir and a pigeon house.

The Knights Hospitallers developed their estate at Hampton Court into one of the largest and best-appointed of their manors in England, and it was frequently used by the royal court as alternative accommodation to Sheen Palace (the royal palace on the Thames at Richmond), (Note: In 1353 Edward III had paid for the Order's manor at Hampton Court to be repaired after his servants accidentally set fire to the roof.) and as a way station and guest house for visitors en route to the royal manor at Byfleet on the River Wye (constructed by Edward II in the early 14th century).

The destruction by fire of Sheen Palace in 1497 saw the royal court move to Hampton Court. In 1500 the Lord Chamberlain Sir Giles Daubeney ordered that 300 acres of the demesne near Hampton be enclosed for hunting, taking out a lease for the entire manor in 1505. After his death in 1508, the lease passed to Sir Giles' wife, who allowed it to lapse. Cardinal Wolsey purchased the lease from the Knights Hospitaller in 1514, and continued development of the site into the historic palace ultimately acquired by Henry VIII after Wolsey's demise in 1530.

=== Post-medieval Hampton ===
The 1534 Act of Supremacy enshrining Henry VIII as supreme head of the Church of England saw the expropriation of Catholic properties throughout England. The Knights Hospitallers Order was formerly dissolved by an Act of Parliament in 1540 and the manor annexed by the Crown. In 1536 Henry acquired part of Teddington from the Abbot of Westminster, enclosing the land for hunting. In 1537 Henry emparked the arable land around Upper Lodge and ordered the construction of brick walls from Hampton Court to Teddington and Hampton Wick. The boundaries of modern-day Bushy Park were set in 1620 with the addition of the Hampton Eastfield (nearest the town).

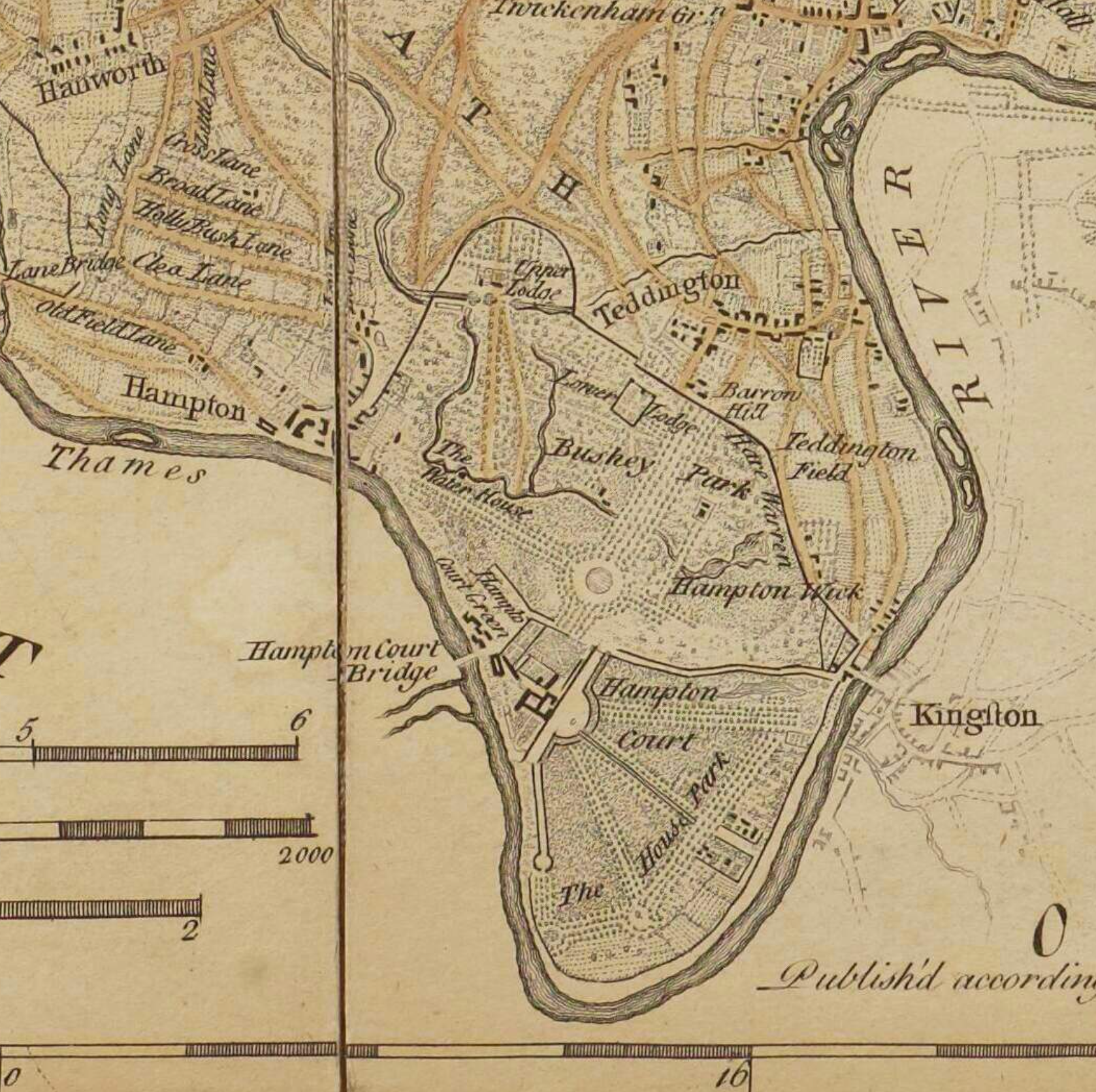
Detail from John Rocque's 1757 map of Middlesex, showing the enclosure of Bushy Park, the Longford River, the settlement of Hampton, and fields to the northwest.

The supply of water for the ever-increasing population of the royal complex at Hampton Court had been problematic since the time Wolsey had first taken the Hospitallers' lease, (Note: The main sources of supply were a conduit head at Coombe Hill, and another in Hampton (where modern-day Plevna Road meets Thames Street). See Heath (2000), p. 16) but it was not until Charles I ordered the construction of a canal connecting the River Colne to the Thames via Hampton Court that the palace secured a steady supply for its household and expanding water features. Designed by Nicholas Lane, the canal started at Longford on the Colne, and was built swiftly in 1638–39, cutting through Feltham, Hanworth, Hounslow Heath, and the north Hampton heath on its route to Bushy Park. Initially unpopular for blocking roads and dividing parishes, the original river (variously known as the Cardinal's, Queen's or King's River) was poorly made and prone to flooding. Protesters dammed the river in 1649 and the river fell into disuse and ran dry during the Protectorate. After the Restoration, Charles II sought to replicate in Bushy Park the garden at Versailles, establishing the Long Water in Home Park as a wedding present for Catherine of Braganza, and thus ordered the Longford River restored.

Between 1500 and 1700 the population of Hampton and Hampton Wick grew from 300–350 to 1100–1200. This growth came despite regular outbreaks of plague in London, which both culled the citizenry and swelled the population of Hampton with the migration of London citizens out of the city. In 1603, 99 of the 119 deaths recorded among Hampton's 400–500 inhabitants were attributed to plague, compared to 11 total deaths the previous year.

All the villages around Hampton Court are infected, and I found yesterday, I, the Duke of Verneuil, while having my walk along the main road, the body of a man who had just died of plague. — Gaston Henri de Bourbon, Ambassador of France to the Court of Charles II, 9 August 1665

In the Christmas of 1603–04 the newly crowned James I moved his court to Hampton Court Palace to escape the outbreak that had blighted London (and Hampton) that summer, before hosting the conference of bishops and clerics (also postponed due to plague) which would commission the Book of Common Prayer and the King James Version of the Bible. In July 1665 the court of Charles II escaped London to Hampton Court after an escalating outbreak of plague in the spring (which would come to be known as "The Great Plague"), but would be forced to move again to Oxford in September after the infection reached Hampton.

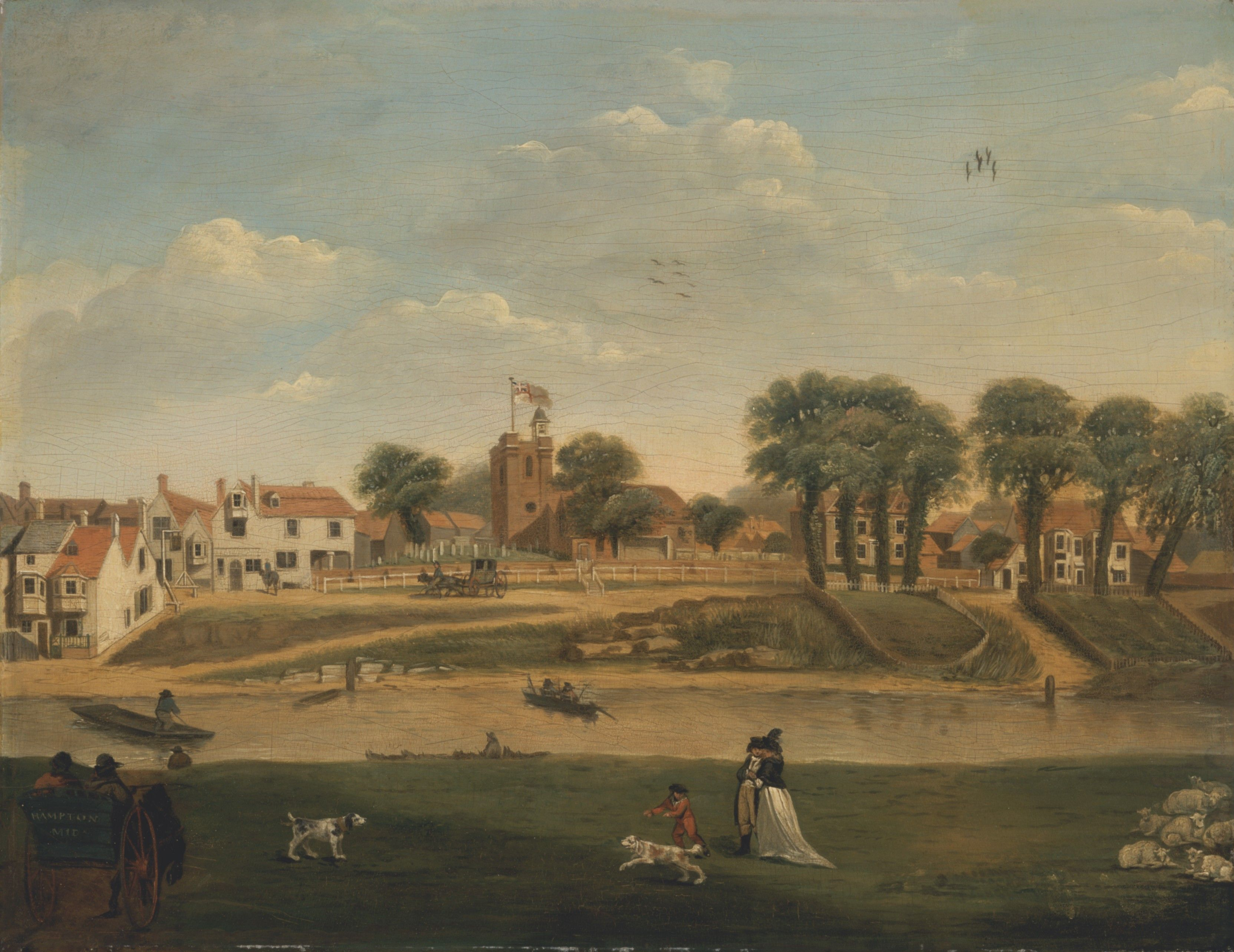
Hampton, late 18th century, showing the previous St Mary's Church

=== Hampton in the Modern era ===
Hampton Inclosure Act 1811
- Act of Parliament
- Parliament of the United Kingdom
- Long title: An Act for inclosing Lands in the Parish of Hampton, in the County of Middlesex.
- Citation: 51 Geo. 3. c. cxxxviii

Dates
- Royal assent: 31 May 1811

Text of statute as originally enacted

Hampton's transition from medieval manor to privately owned land and housing began with the passage of the Hampton Inclosure Act 1811 (51 Geo. 3. c. cxxxviii), which led to the parcelling and enclosure of common land, and a steady increase in population. The rapid growth and urbanisation of 19th-century London saw agricultural production pushed out to the city's perimeter. Land in north Hampton which had been used for grazing and farming was enclosed and, after unsuccessful attempts at residential development, (Note: In the late 19th century various attempts were made to develop the land that was Chalk Farm. Large country house plots were advertised in 1863 to commuters on the new railway line to London Waterloo expected the following year, but only a few houses were ever built and the owners put into liquidation in 1890.) was converted to market gardens and nurseries to service the increased demand from London markets.

Land north of the Longford River, comprising part of the Heath

Land between Uxbridge Road and the Longford River, comprising part of the Heath, including the current sites of Hampton High, Hampton School and Lady Eleanor Holles School

Land on the River Thames between the Lower and Upper Sunbury Roads, comprising parts of West Field and Ersh Mead, including the current site of the Hampton Water Treatment Works

1827–1828 Hampton Enclosure Maps

Having last been used as a royal residence by George II, Queen Victoria opened the State Apartments of Hampton Court Palace to the general public in 1838, displaying artworks from the Royal Collection. The 1840–46 restoration and redecoration of the Great Hall (Note: See Edward Jesse) saw the palace became a major tourist attraction. Visitor numbers increased further following the opening of the Hampton Court branch line (off the London and Southampton Railway mainline) in 1849 (see Hampton Court Palace).

The passage of the Metropolis Water Act 1852 made it unlawful for any water company to extract water for domestic use from the tidal reaches of the Thames (i.e. below Teddington Lock). This led to the Southwark and Vauxhall, Grand Junction and West Middlesex water companies to jointly construct water works on the Thames at Hampton, between the Sunbury and Molesey Locks, which began operations in 1855, and became a major employer (see Hampton Water Treatment Works).

The Shepperton branch line, including Hampton and Fulwell stations, was opened in 1864, and electrified in 1916. The curve of the railway line would come to define the suburb of Hampton distinct from the original village, but did not immediately lead to an increase in population (unlike neighbouring Teddington). The 'New Street' (now Station Road) was developed along the route of a historic trackway to link Hampton Station to the village. The area around the station between the railway line and the water works began to be developed for housing in the 1880s and 1890s, and was occupied primarily by Metropolitan Water Board staff and their families. (Note: The area developed comprised the manorial-era 'Oldfield', memorialised as Oldfield Road. The 'River Hill' Estate at the eastern end of the development was laid out in 1878, including Belgrade Road, Plevna Road and Varna Road named after towns in the contemporaneous Russo-Turkish war.)

Ordnance Survey map (1894–5) showing Hampton, including Hampton Hill to the north east, Nurseries to the north west and Water Works on the river. The street plan follows the old field boundaries.

Hampton recorded a population of 1,722 in the Census of 1801, rising to 3,134 in the Census of 1851, and 9,220 in the Census of 1911. The passage of the Local Government Act 1858 allowed for the creation of elected Local Boards, which, unlike civil parishes, had the power to borrow money against future revenue, allowing for capital projects. Hampton residents initially voted in 1865 against establishing a Local Board, but after being subsumed into the Kingston Rural Sanitary Authority in 1872, voted in favour of establishment in 1884. Permission was however denied on the basis of Hampton being too small an area, and a Local Board was not created for Hampton until 1890. The Board converted to an Urban District Council in 1895, and established its office in Rosehill in 1902 (see Rosehill and Hampton Library).

St Mary's Church had been demolished in 1829 and replaced by the present larger building in 1831, at which time the parish of Hampton Wick was separately established. (Note: The hamlet of Hampton Wick had its own churchwarden as early as 1653. The hamlet and the town of Hampton had various disputes regarding monies owed and charitable distributions throughout the 17th and 18th centuries, which were ultimately only resolved by the establishment of separate parishes.) The parish of Hampton was further divided with the establishment of the parish of St James's Hampton Hill in 1863, (Note: Whereas the parish of Hampton Hill was so-named in 1863, the Postmaster General's Office did not confirm the district name change (from 'New Hampton') until 1890.) and the parish of All Saints' in 1929 following the consecration of All Saints Church in 1908.

Hampton developed into its current form of a residential suburb of London over the course of the late 19th and 20th centuries, as the families of professional workers settled within commuting distance of the city, and demand for local shops and services grew. A police station was first opened in Hampton in c1840, and moved into purpose-built premises at 12 Station Road in 1846 (with an inspector and 9 constables). A "new and more commodious" Police Station was opened at 68 Station Road in 1905. Hampton fire station was built in 1897. London United Tramways extended its network from Twickenham to Hampton, Hampton Court, East Twickenham (west of Richmond Bridge) and Teddington in 1903.

=== Hampton during the Great War and Interwar period ===
Following the outbreak of the Great War, recruitment drives were held by both services on Hampton Court Green in the summer of 1915. (Note: The introduction of conscription in January 1916 made such drives generally redundant.) A mass meeting on Hampton Court Road in June 1916 calling for government action regarding aliens was followed later that month by a meeting of 5,000 people on Hampton Court Green calling for the internment of all Germans and Austrians. St Mary's Hospital was used throughout the war as a military hospital, and the Whitehall Hotel (Note: Now Rotary Court.) was converted to a military hospital in January 1917. Food shortages led to the ploughing and cultivation of fields in Bushy Park, and allotments established in Nine-Acre Field in Percy Road and other open land throughout Hampton.

Suburban development of the area bound north of the railway line took place mostly during the Interwar period: (Note: The houses in Thames Street were numbered in 1919, but the major new streets north of the railway line were numbered in the late 1920s and early 1930s. See Sheaf (2015), pp. 33, 45, 53, 60, 70, 92, 97, 115. 'The Ormonds' (named after the 2nd Duke of Ormonde) east of the railway line were developed progressively: Ormond Ave was established in 1906 and numbered in 1935, but houses in Ormond Drive and Ormond Crescent were mostly built post-WWII. See Sheaf (2019), p. 77 and Sheaf (2015) p. 93.) the streetplan laid out generally following old lanes and field boundaries. (Note: Uxbridge Road is a notable exception, arising from a boundary determined upon enclosure in the early 19th century, following older tracks in part. See Sheaf (2019) p. 71 and Sheaf (2015), pp. 53–54.) The commercial centre of Hampton also gravitated away from the original triangle of streets around St Mary's Church to along Station Road near Hampton Station, as the increased popularity of the motor car led to increased traffic (and associated dust, mud, noise) along the road between Sunbury and Kingston. The Electric Theatre opened in 1912 on Station Road, seating 400. (Note: Shows nightly Tuesday to Friday, with a Saturday afternoon children's matinee. See Sheaf (2015) p. 10) Renamed The Palaceum in the 1920s, it operated until 1938. Hampton Pool was built in 1922 (on land previously occupied by the Hampton and Hampton Hill Rifle Club) after plans approved in 1914 were delayed due to the outbreak of the World War I (see Hampton Pool).

The four-storey telephone exchange on High Street near St Mary's was built in 1927 as a replacement for the original telephone exchange at Manor Road in Molesey (hence known as the Molesey Telephone Exchange). The exchange switched from manual operation to Subscriber Trunk Dialling in the 1960s, and an additional building constructed on the other side of Old Farm Passage (Note: The two buildings were connected by a first-floor footway over Old Farm Passage.) ini 1982. The exchange was enabled for ADSL broadband internet in 2000, and the newer building demolished in 2001. (Note: The site is now occupied by the Kyle House flats.)

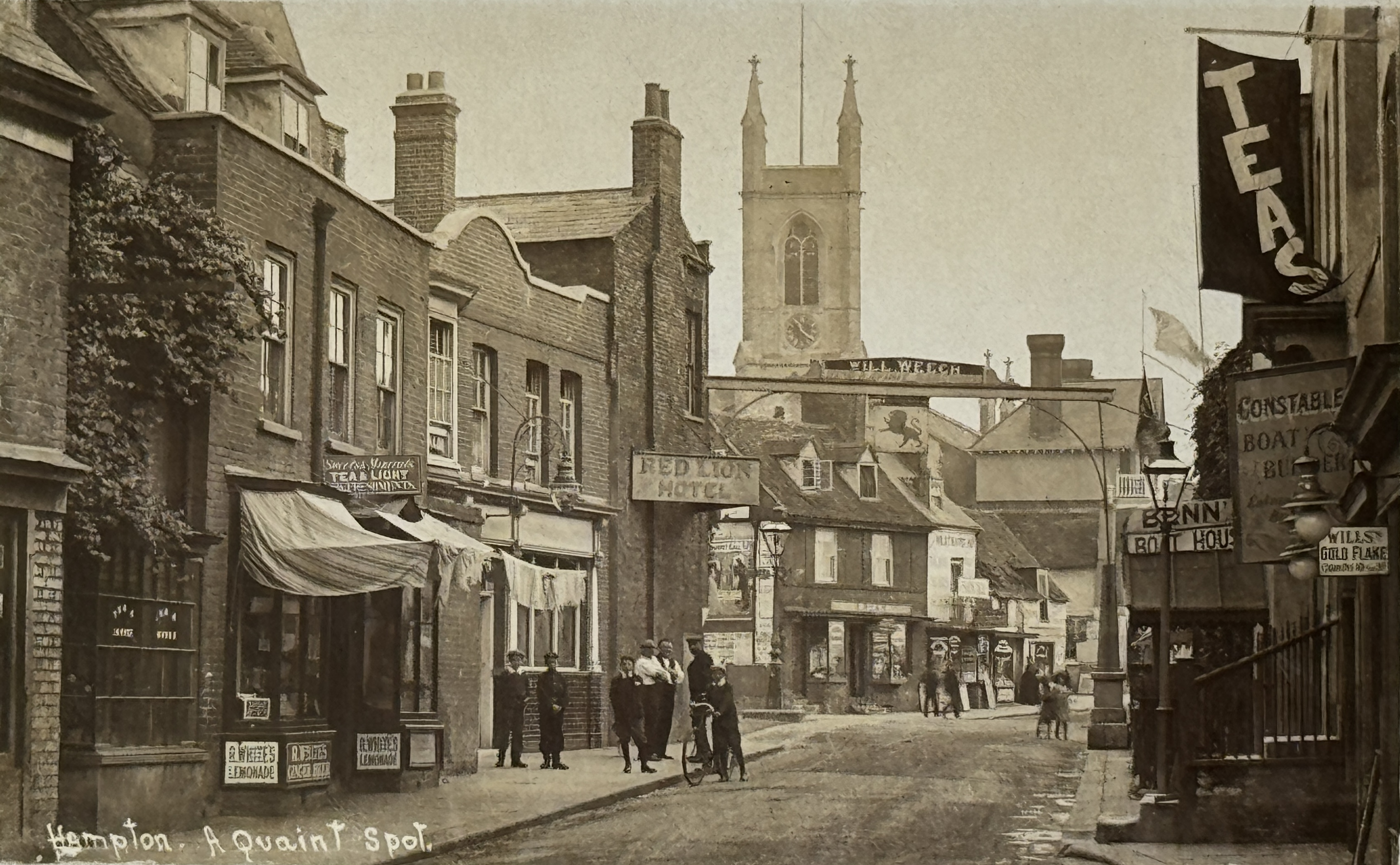
Hampton Thames Street c1911, showing the Red Lion hotel, the frontage to Constable's Boatyard and St Mary's Church. Note the unsurfaced road.

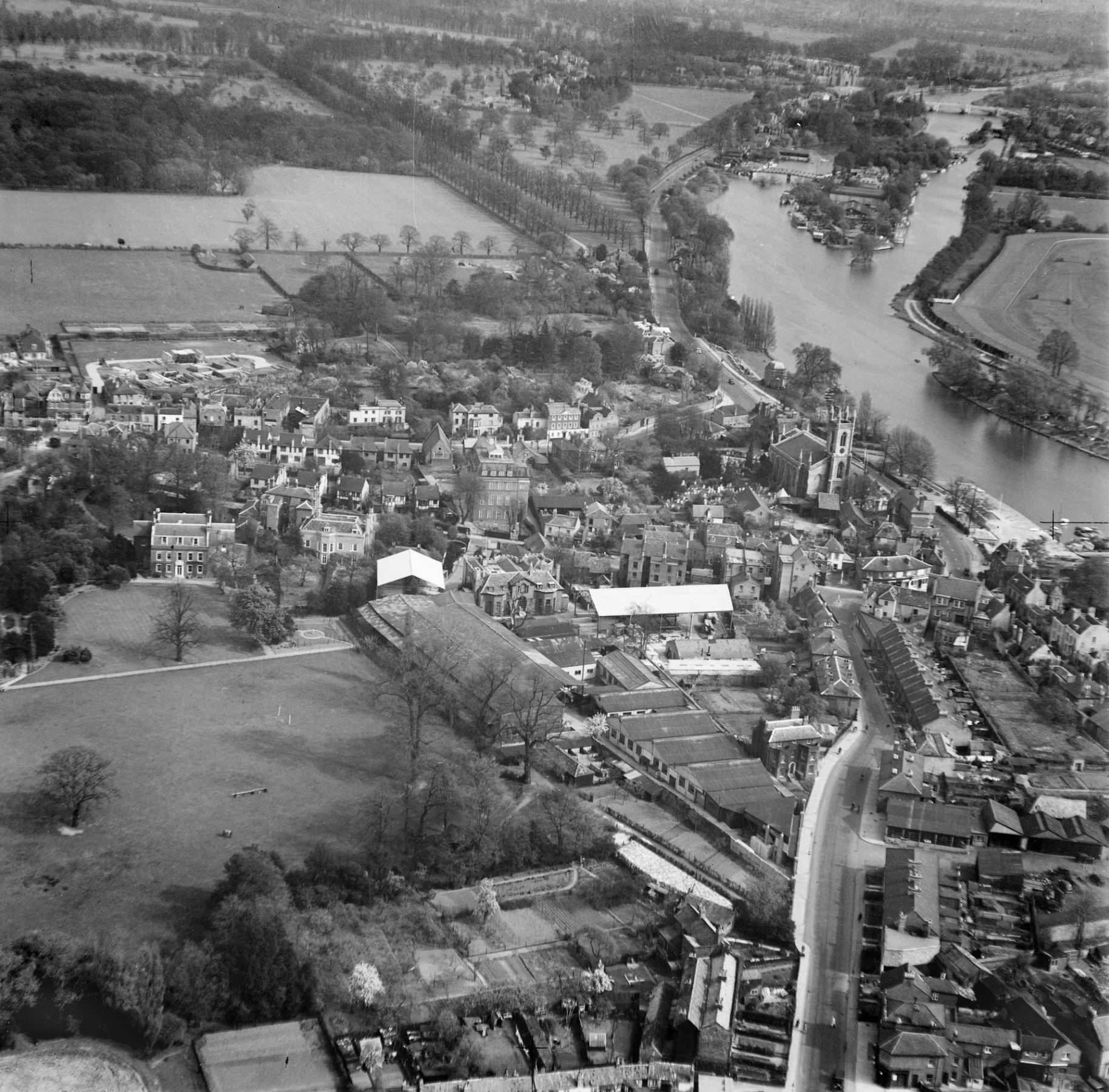
Hampton 1946, showing Station Road with the Meux Cottages terrace leading to St Mary's Church, the Beveree (left of frame), Castle House (centre), and Hurst Park Racecourse, Tagg's Island and Hampton Court Palace (top right)

=== Hampton during the Second World War ===
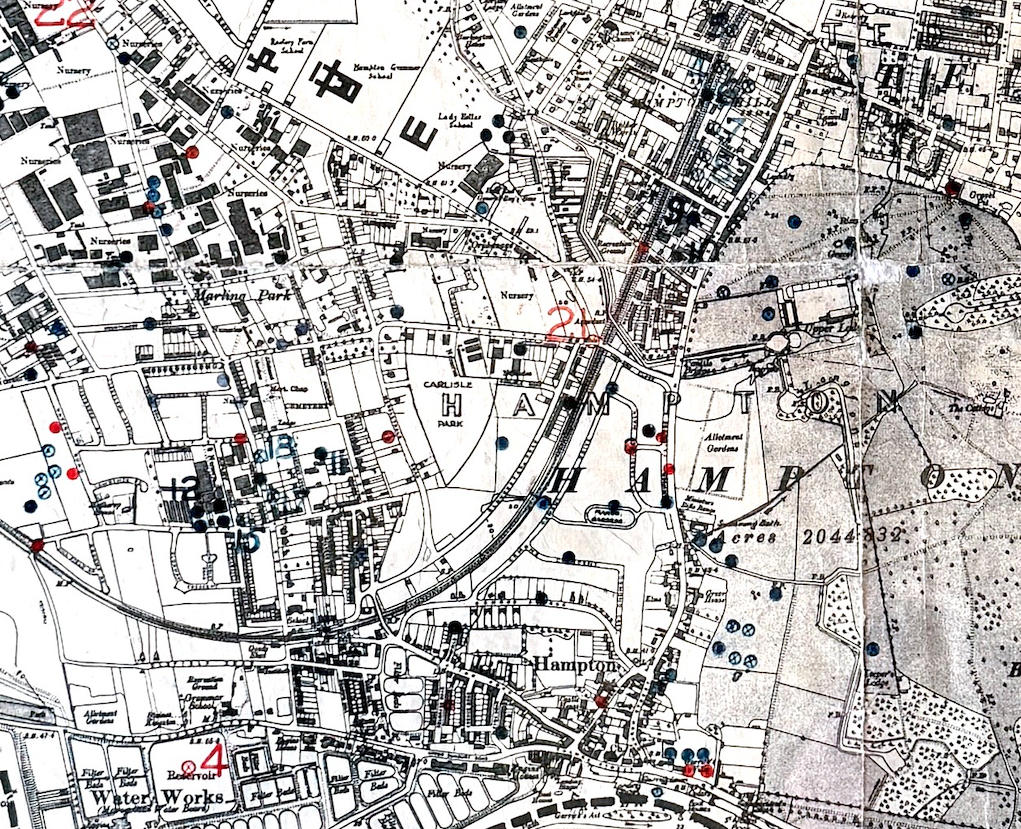
Detail from Borough of Twickenham Bomb Map 1940–45 showing bomb impacts in Hampton. Blue dots represent high explosive bombs, red incendiary bombs, and crosses unexploded ordnance.

Preparations by the Borough of Twickenham for the outbreak of hostilities in the Second World War began in 1936, and a public meeting held to discuss the enlistment of Air Raid Precaution (ARP) wardens held in the Public Hall on Church Street on 30 November that year. Anderson shelters were distributed to houses in Hampton, and public shelters constructed, (Note: e.g. A large shelter was built under the traffic island in Manor Gardens.) during 1939–1940. Three air-raid rescue parties (out of 11 for the Borough) were established in Oldfield Road.

The first bomb to fall on the Borough in the Battle of Britain fell on 153 Tudor Road in the first night attack on London on 24 August 1940, and properties throughout Hampton were damaged and destroyed as bombing continued through 1940. On 7 October a high-explosive bomb landing in Warfield Road demolished most of the houses on Station Road between the Worlds End and Railway Inn pubs, killing four. Four nights later a high-explosive bomb damaged another five neighbouring shops (Note: Nos. 92–100) on Station Road. On the night of 7 November Hampton was hit by 8 high-explosive bombs, (Note: In Dean Road, killing one person; on the "White House" killing a family of three, and in Oak Avenue, killing two.) killing six people.

In 1944, Bushy Park was a huge, mainly US military base. One sunny morning in June we were cycling through the park, past lines of American tents. Nearby was a sandbagged gun emplacement with an anti aircraft gun inside. As we neared it, a soldier rushed out and wound a warning siren denoting imminent danger. A few seconds later we saw and heard a V1 coming straight toward us. The gun crew started elevating the gun to fire at the V1. Just then an officer rushed out of the tent and shouted, "Don't fire at the goddamned thing – let it go over and hit some other poor sons of bitches – get in the ditch and take those boys with you." As we dived into the ditch, the V1's engine cut out ... — David Fisher (Hampton Grammar schoolboy), June 1944

In 1944 V1 flying bombs and later V2 rockets either passed over or landed in or near Hampton (their distinctive noises recorded in residents' diaries). (Note: The diary of a local schoolboy records: "One late afternoon as the sirens wailed, we were confined to school awaiting the all clear. I was standing with an HGS mate from Teddington ... As we looked skyward a V1 appeared over the school; the motors cut and the gliding commenced. As it disappeared from view, we estimated that it landed somewhere in the Teddington area. When the all clear sounded we hurriedly made our way home. As we approached the impact area we noticed increased police, fire and ambulance activity. My school mate made his way to his house only to realise that there was extensive damage. The V1 had indeed detonated in Teddington. His house was severely damaged and his mother was nowhere to be found. Death became a reality and understandably the fascination of tracking gliding V1s disappeared in this moment of despair." See Rice (2009), p. 59) On 19 June 1944 two V1 bombs landed in Hampton, one near Hampton Grammar School (breaking two panes of glass), the other falling into a reservoir at the Hampton Water Treatment Works blowing out the windows of the nearby Grange building. (Note: The Grammar School's former premises, vacated 1939.) On 7 January 1945, a V2 rocket was heard to pass over Hampton and land in Teddington.

VE Day celebrations were held in Carlisle Park, with dancing from 8 to 11 pm; a drumhead service (Note: A military religious service held in a field, using drums as an altar.) was held on Sunday 9 June, and children's events on 10 June, culminating with fireworks.

=== Post-war Hampton ===
==== Regeneration ====
Post-war austerity and recovery meant construction activity in Hampton focussed on the immediate needs of house rebuilding and repair, with construction of new roads and housing not returning to pre-war levels until the mid-1950s. The 1970s and 1980s saw the demolition and regeneration of significant parts of Hampton, including land occupied by the nurseries, and derelict properties along the riverfront.

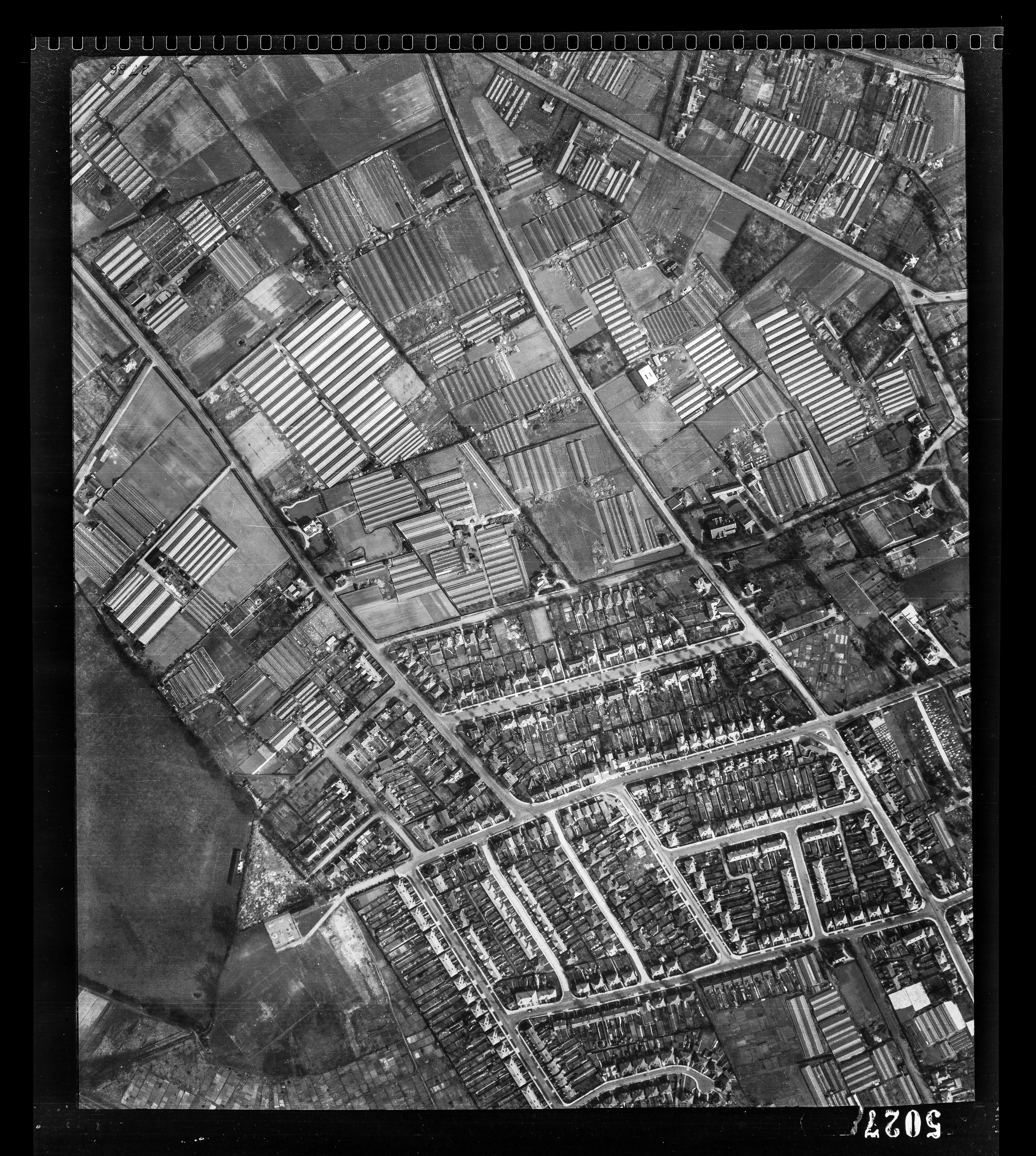
Aerial photograph of glasshouses 1947 (Note: Broad Lane E-W, Oak Lane/The Avenue N-S)

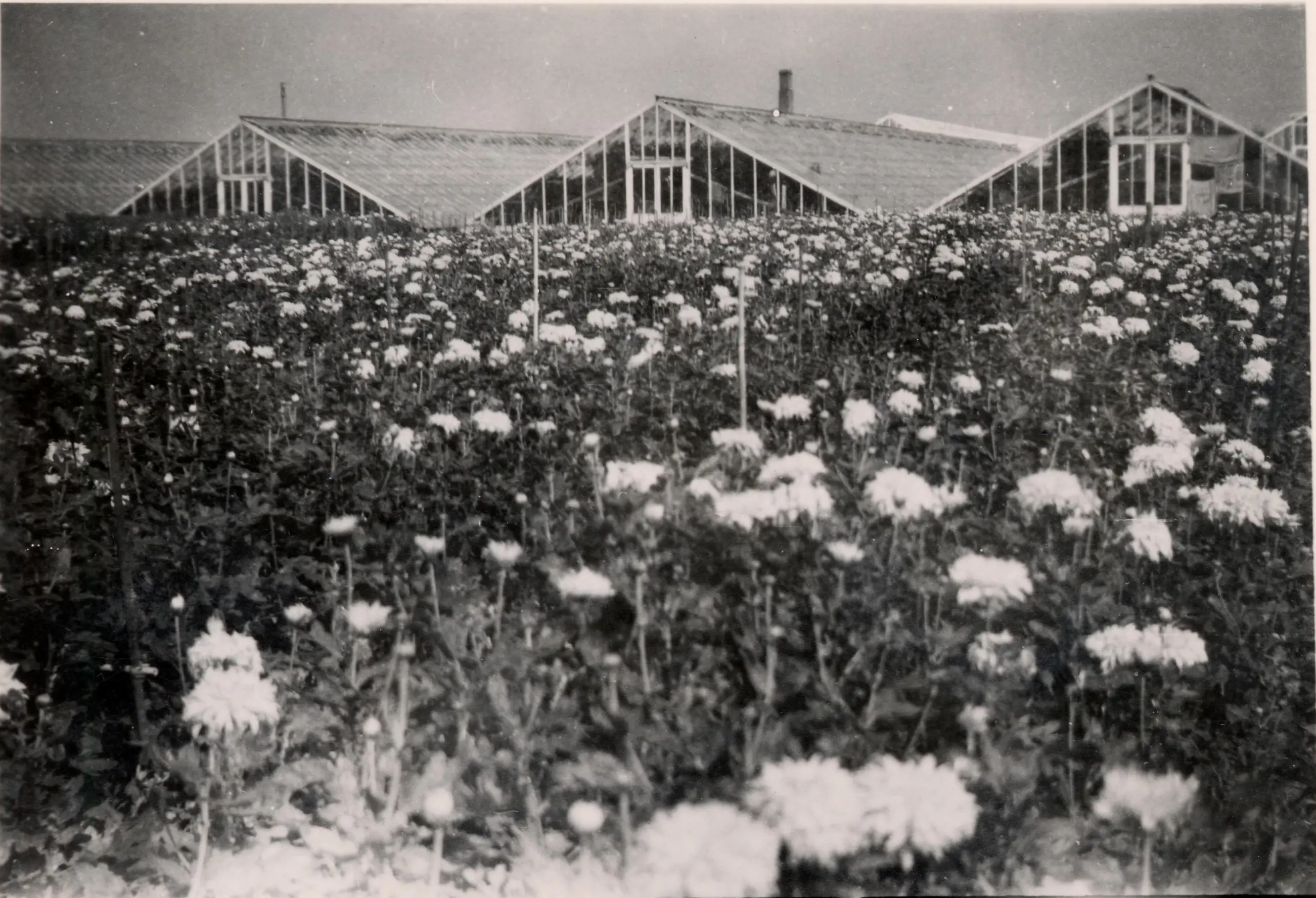
Glasshouses 1947

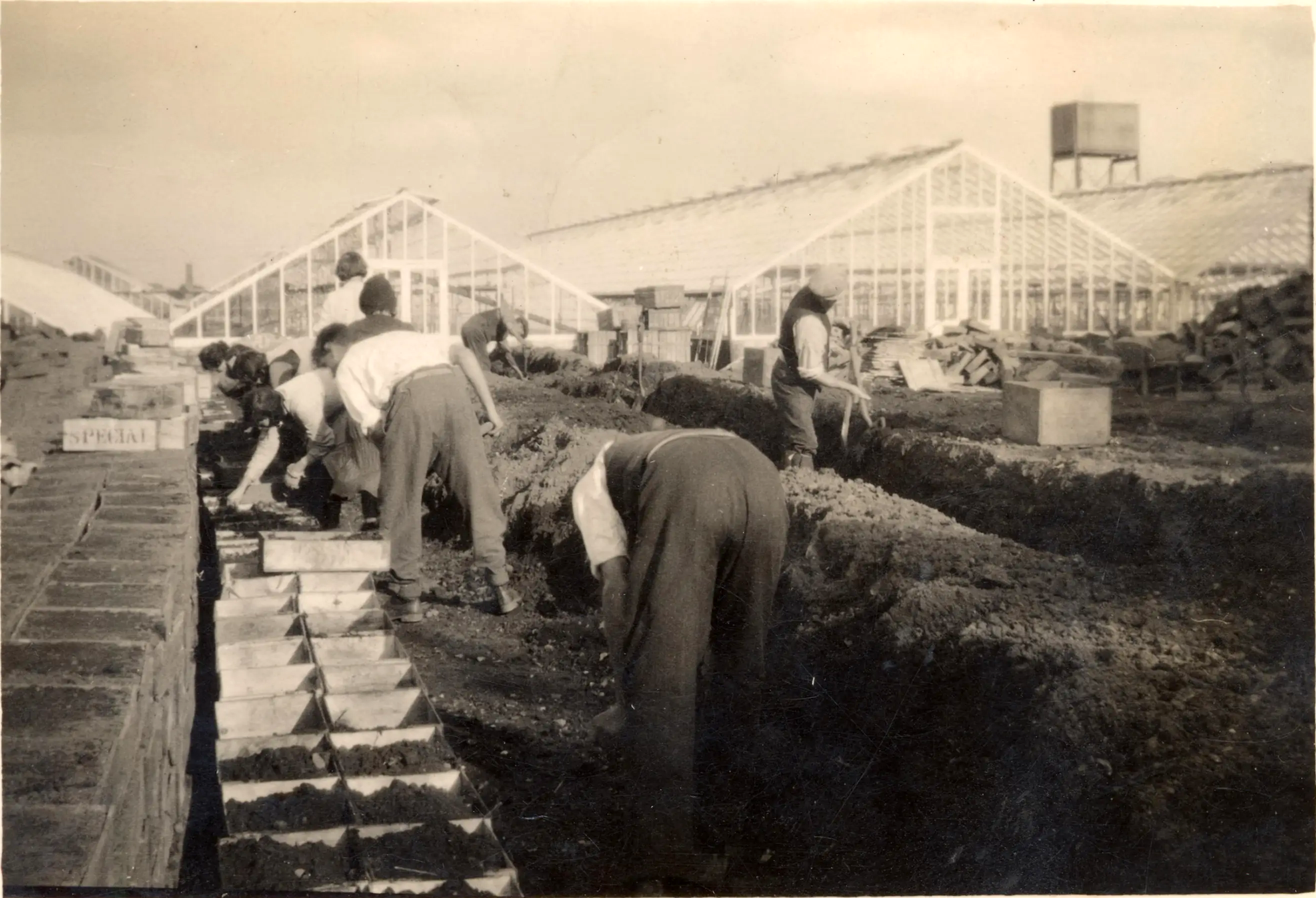
Nurseries workers 1940s

Hampton Nurseries 1940s

The Hampton nurseries had begun to face competition in the 1960s from overseas and domestic produce sourced using refrigeration, air freight and cheaper labour, and by the 1970s had become uncompetitive and increasingly derelict. After a lengthy planning process, work to develop the area into the Nurserylands Housing estate began in 1980, with 48 new roads built by 1989. The Sainsbury's 'superstore' built on the site of the St Clare's nursery in 1989–90 was at the time the largest built by Sainsbury's in the UK. (Note: Having 41 checkouts.) The population of Hampton North / Hampton Nursery rose from 3,977 to 6,426 between the 1981 and 1991 Censuses.

During the 1970s several historic Thames Street properties backing onto the river became derelict, partly due to the planning blight associated with proposals to construct an elevated road along the riverside, (Note: Originally proposed in 1958, the evelated road proposal was only shelved following the completion of the nearby sections of the M25 in the early 1980s.) and were successively demolished during the 1980s. Spring Grove, constructed in the 1760s by the Clerk of Works at Hampton Court Palace on the site of the original conduit house supplying the palace, was demolished in 1981, having fallen into disrepair and despite repeated proposals for restoration. (Note: The site is now occupied by the houses of Spring Grove.) St Albans, an imposing Restoration-era riverside property on Hampton Court Road, had been bequeathed to the Borough of Twickenham upon the death of the owner in 1961, (Note: Under the terms of the bequest by Theodore Cory, the property was to become a museum, complete with its Victorian-era furnishings, in memorial to his wife Winifred. By the time the Borough took possession of the property in 1964, most of the furniture had been stolen.) but inaction on the part of the Council saw the property fall into disrepair and become unstable, and the property was demolished in February 1972. (Note: The Council posted three weeks' notice of St Albans' demolition on 24 February, but began demolition the following day, citing safety concerns.) The gardens of St Albans are retained as St Albans Riverside.

Serial killer Levi Bellfield murdered Marsha McDonnell near her home in Hampton on 4 February 2003.

The population of Hampton in the 2021 census was recorded as 27,307, with 77.4% recording the United Kingdom as their country of birth. During the COVID-19 pandemic, 52% of Hampton residents in employment recorded in the 2021 Census that they worked mainly from home, compared to 32% for England, reflecting Hampton's status as a commuter suburb.

== Hampton and the River Thames ==
Hampton stands on the north bank of a bend in the River Thames, and has a close historical association with the river as a trading post, commercial/industrial centre, and recreation destination.

=== Industry ===
Boatyards and slipways have led down to the river from the village for centuries. Benn's boathouse on Thames Street was reputed to have been built before 1704 (being demolished in 1946–47 and merging with Constable's boatyard next door).

Platt's Eyot was the site of multiple boatyards during the 19th and 20th centuries. Thomas Tagg constructed the first boatyard on the island's eastern end in 1866, with German electric engine builder Moritz Immisch taking over the site to build electric launches from 1888. In 1904 shipbuilder John Isaac Thornycroft established the Hampton Launch Works, generating cabin cruisers and pleasure craft, including world water speed record holder Miss England III. During wartime, production shifted: to torpedo-carrying motor launches in the First World War, and constructing motor torpedo boats, motor launches and landing craft during the Second World War.

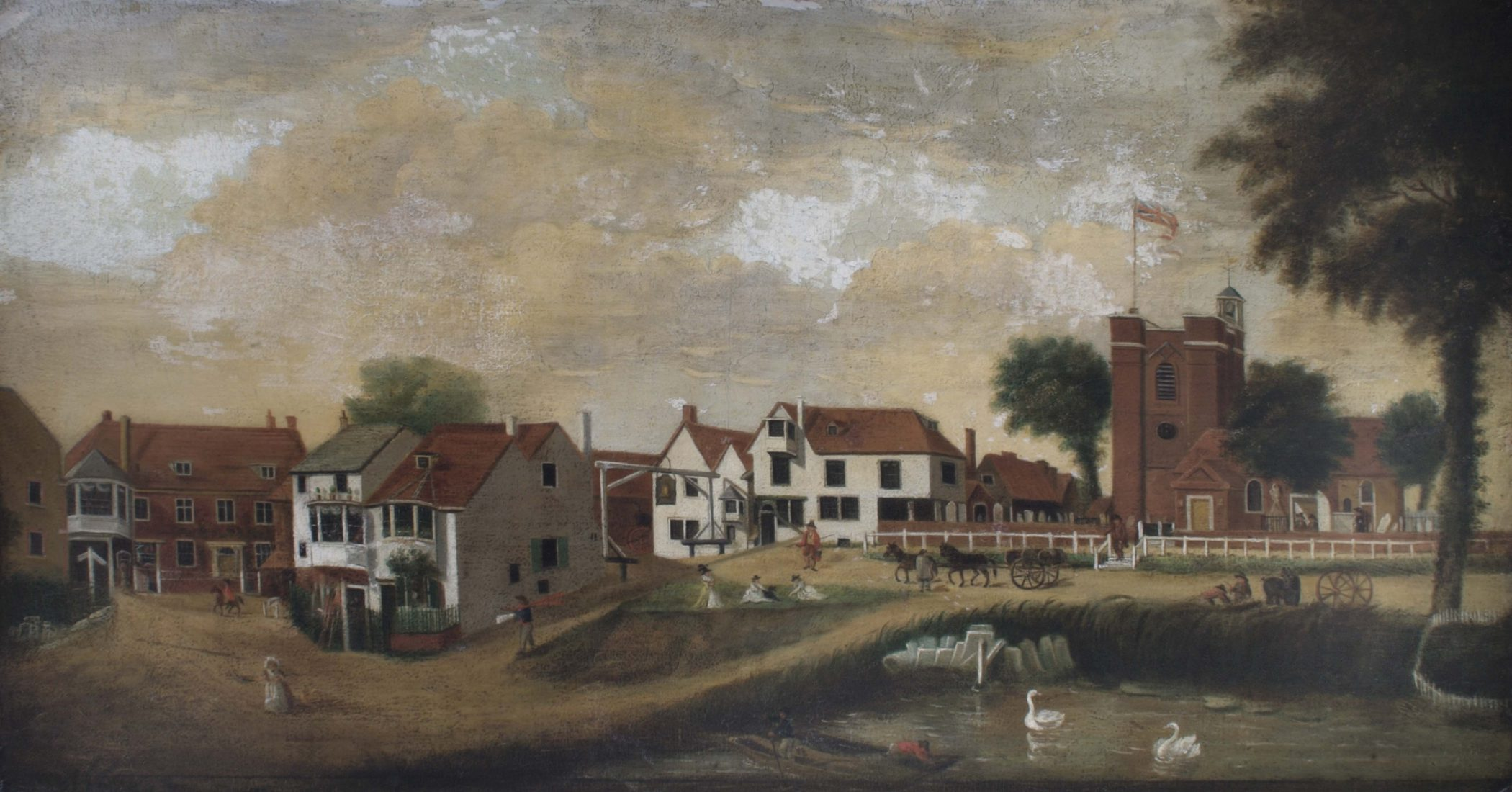
The Hampton riverside circa 1825, showing slipways to the Thames

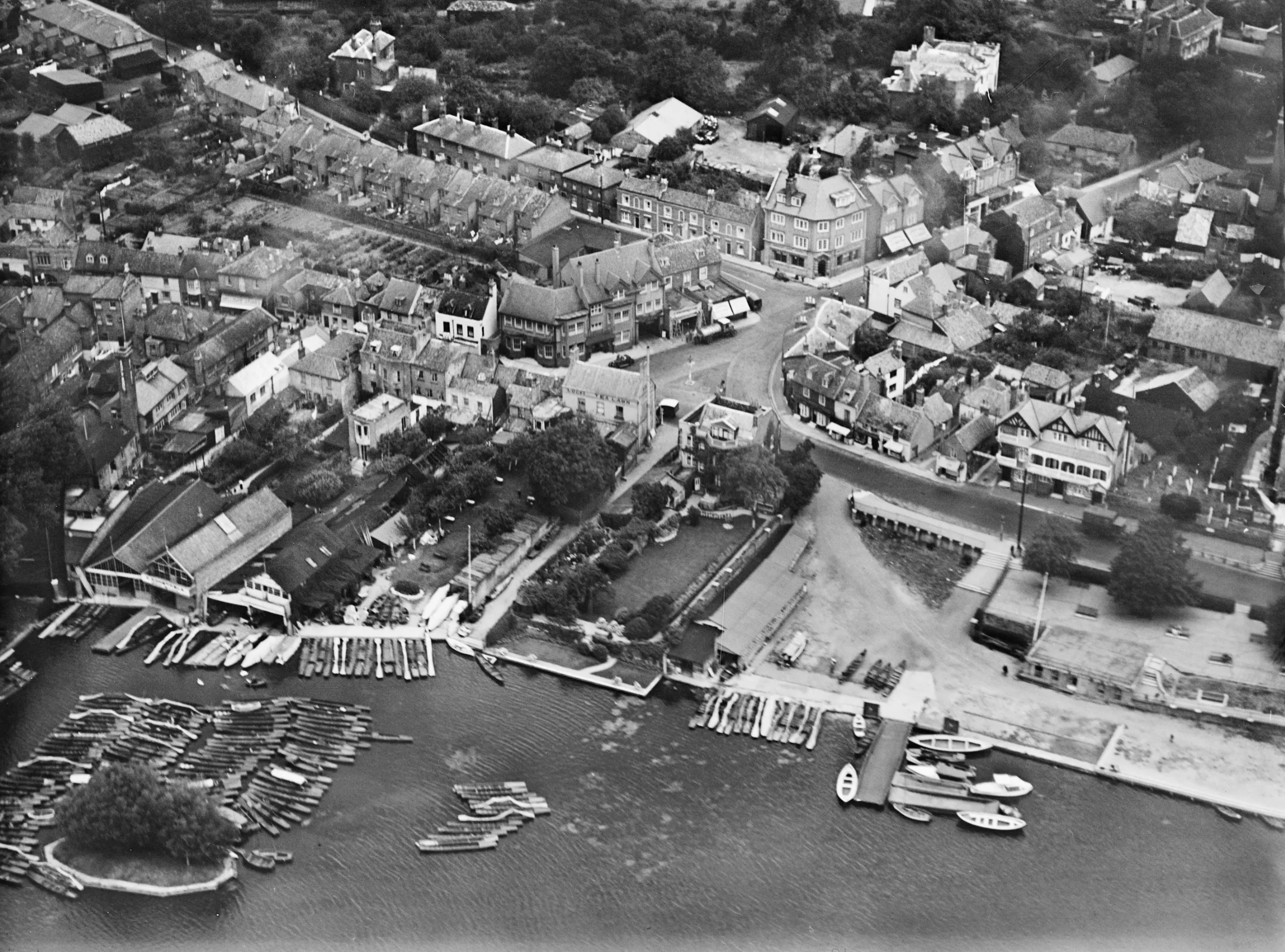
Hampton 1928, showing boatyards on the riverside and around Benn's Island

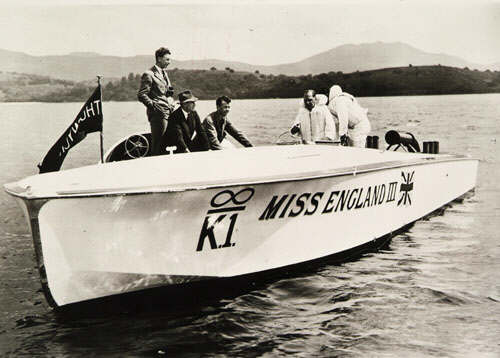
Miss England III on Loch Lomond July 1932 before setting a new world water speed record of 119.81 mph.

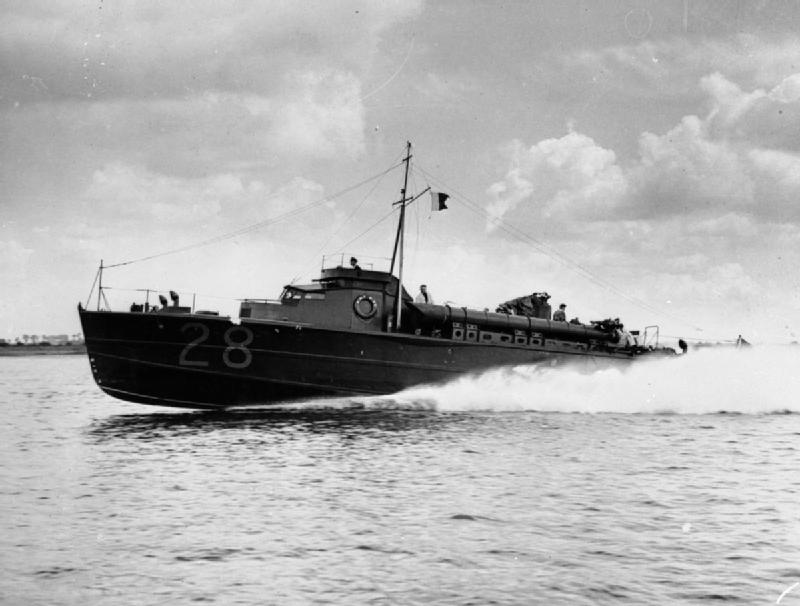
MTB 28 Motor Torpedo Boat Thornycroft 73 feet-type class c1940

=== Recreation ===
In the 19th century the growth of the London middle class, increase in leisure time (assisted by the passage of the Bank Holidays Act 1871), and the extension of rail and tram networks to London's perimeter, saw attractions on the Thames become destinations for mass recreation. Rowing became a popular activity from the mid-19th century and Hampton Reach came to host regular regattas (see Rowing). Significant numbers of day-trippers would travel by river, tram and rail to visit Hampton Court Palace after it was opened to the public (with free admission) in 1838 (see Hampton Court Palace). Tagg's Island became the site of multiple resort hotel developments, culminating with the grand Karsino Hotel in 1913. As Henry Ripley wrote in 1883:

And what a view it is that strikes the observer when at length he reaches the "Bell" Hill, especially if he makes its first acquaintance at the close of a fine summer's day! ... The fishing punts moored in the Deeps, the numerous sailing-craft (chiefly claiming affinity with the Thames Valley Sailing Club) cruising merrily about, the countless row-boats with their gay and merry occupants, the constant relays of steam-launches, ruining the fishing and river banks, and keeping timid oarsmen in perpetual fear and dread, the noisy tugs, churning the river into masses of foam as they haul in their wakes long strings of heavily-laden barges, the picturesque picnic parties on Garrick's Eyot, with the comfortable-looking and gaily-decked house-boats moored under its banks; all those features (to begin with) form a picture that rivets the eye and impresses the mind at once. — Henry Ripley, The History and Topography of Hampton-on-Thames, 1883

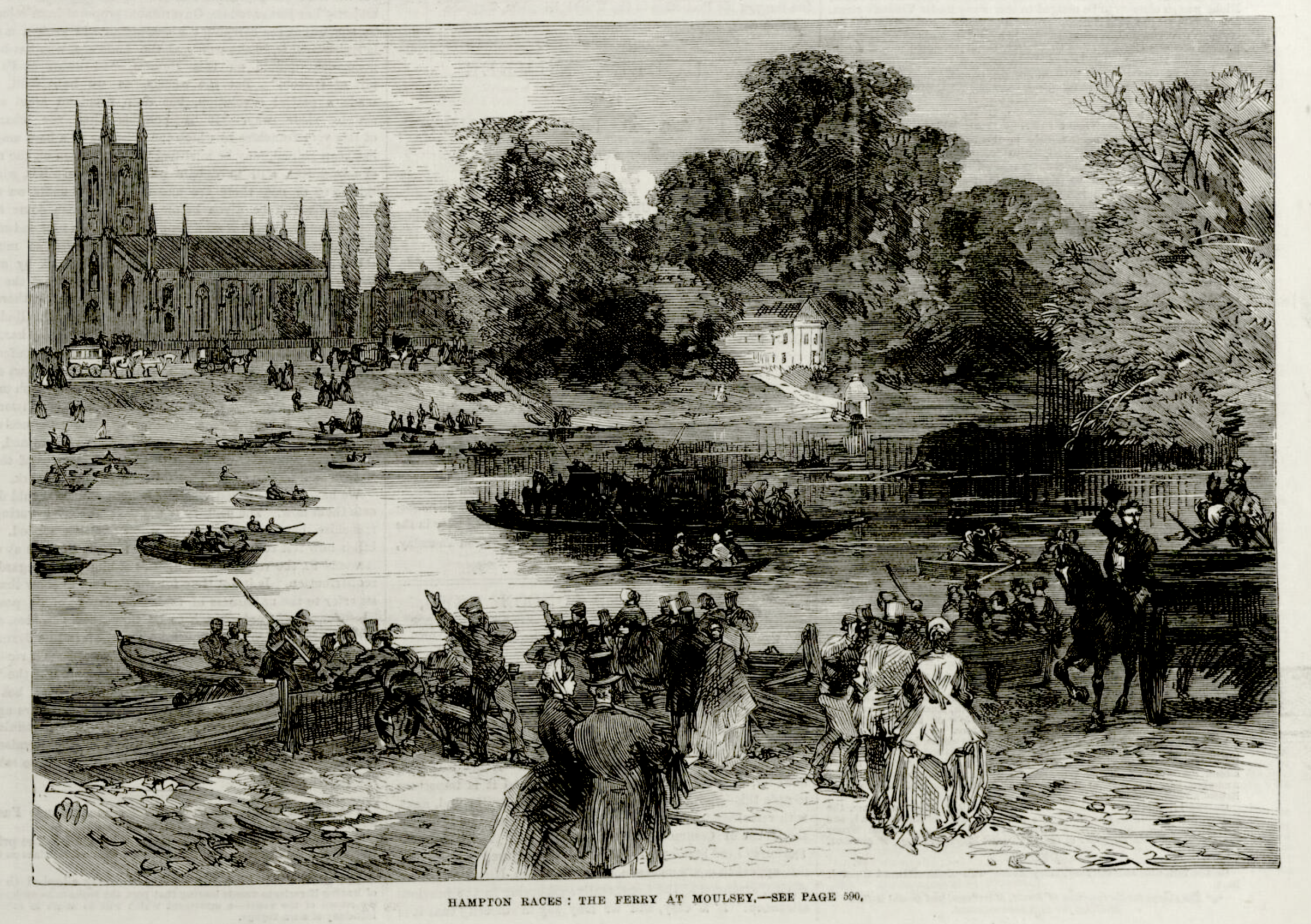
The Illustrated London News 'Hampton Races – the ferry at Molesey' 1866

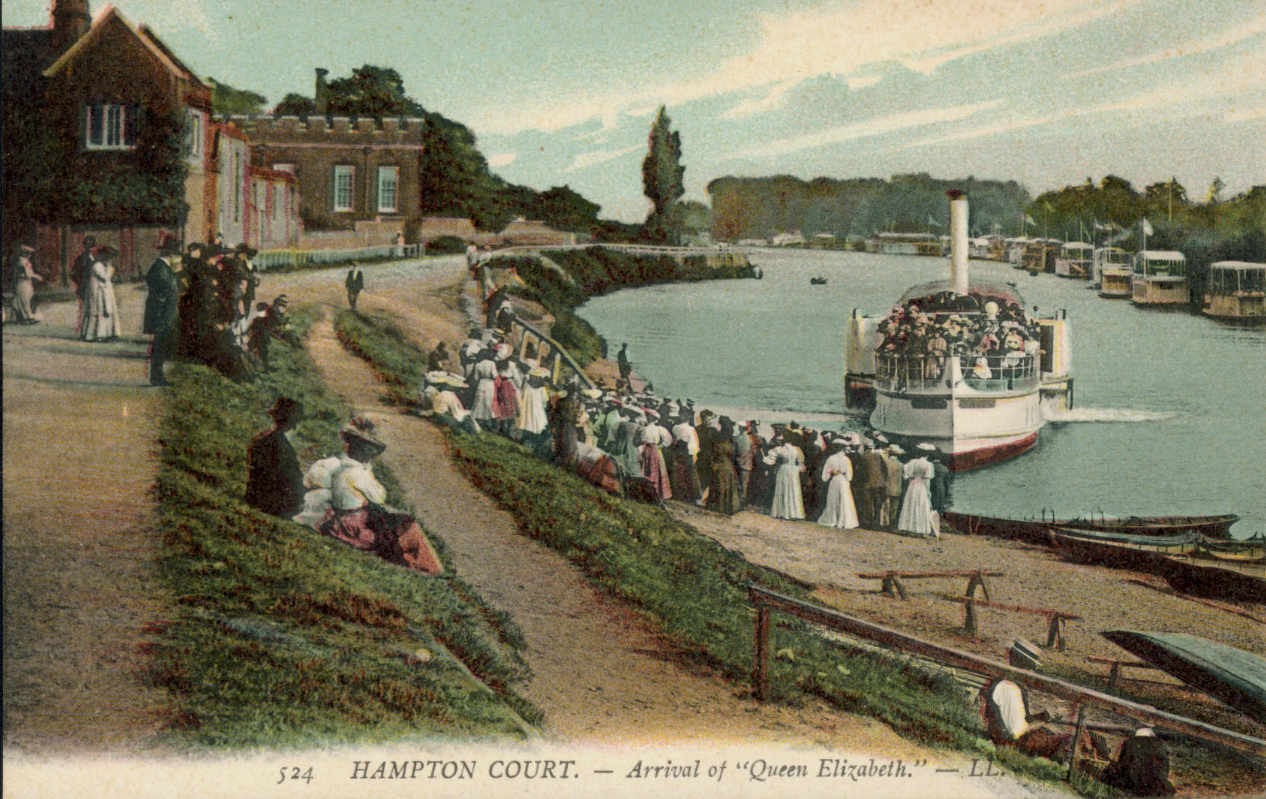
Arrival of the paddlesteamer "Queen Elizabeth" at Hampton Court 1911

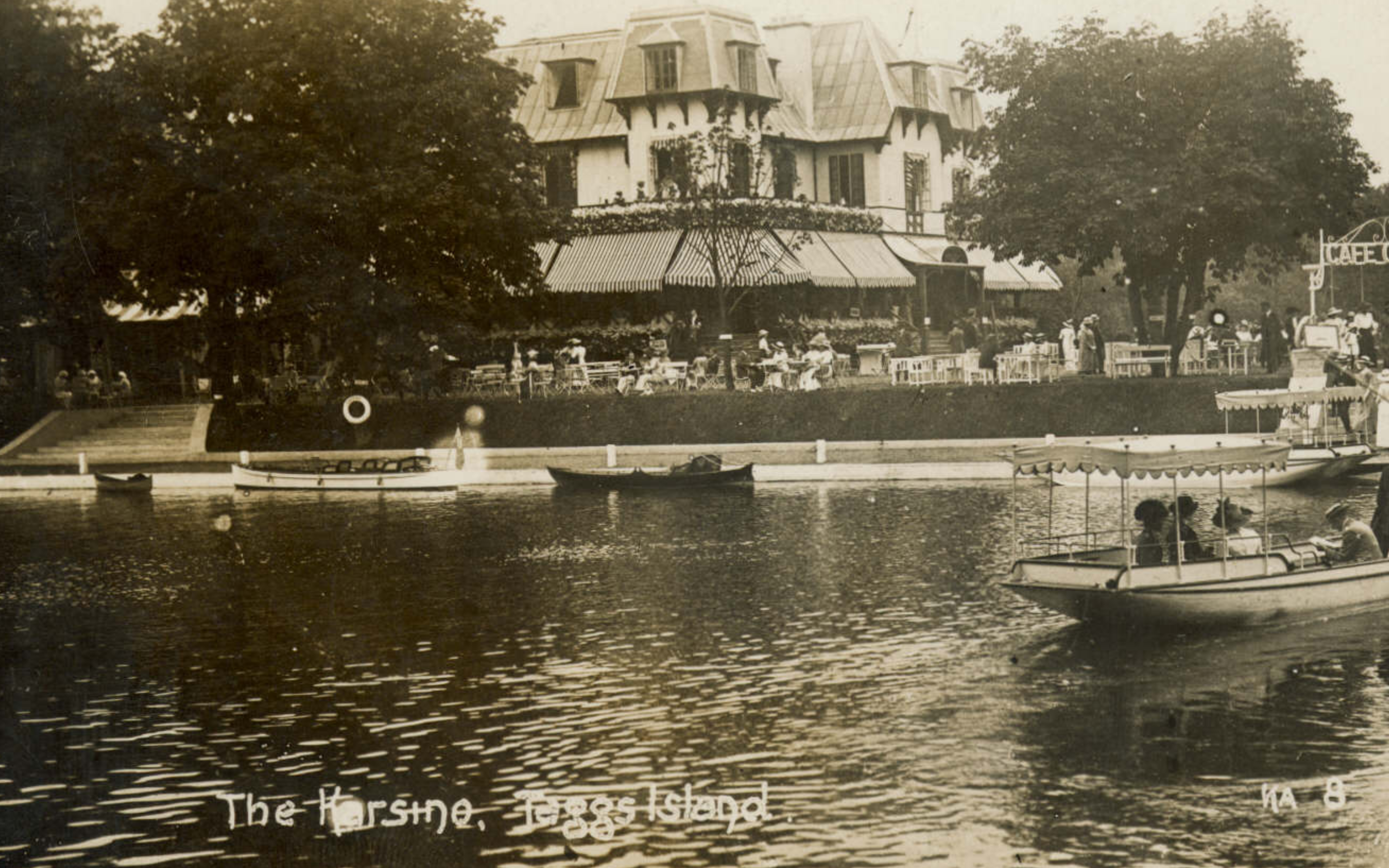
The Karsino Hotel Tagg's Island circa 1913

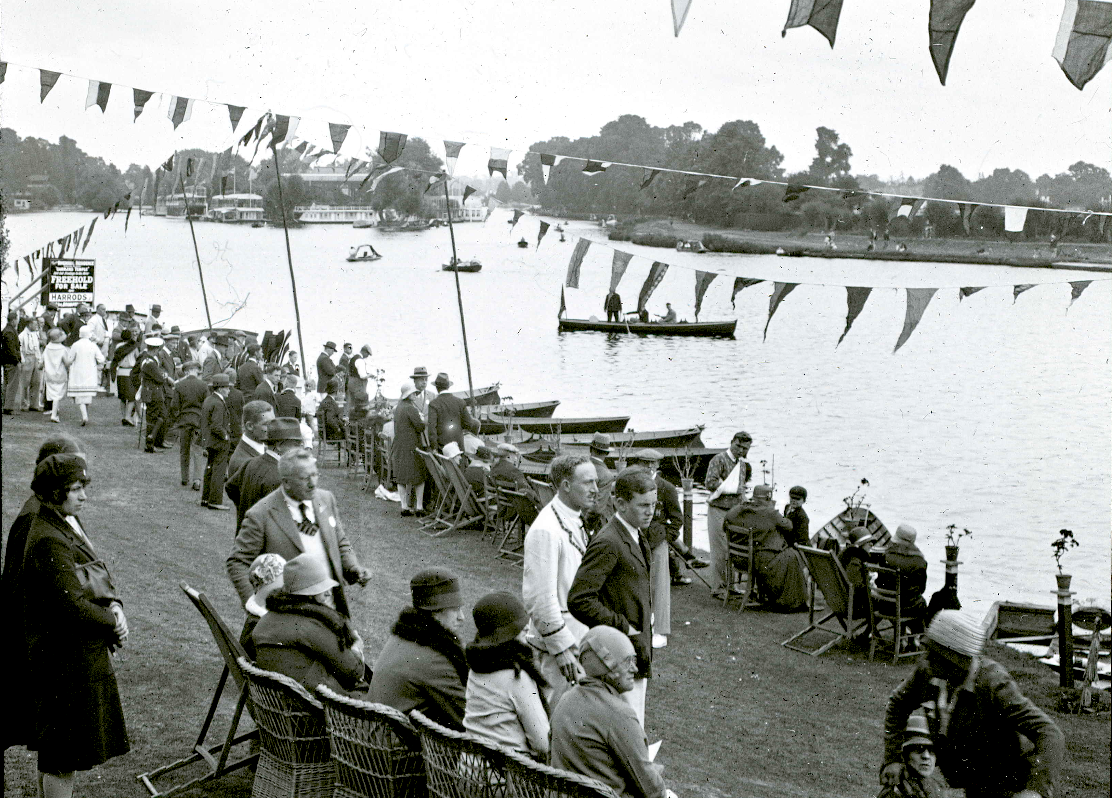
Hampton Regatta 1929

=== Islands ===
Hampton comprises Platt's Eyot, Benn's Island and Tagg's Island, but historically also includes Garrick's Ait and Ash Island.

==== Platt's Eyot ====
Platt's Eyot is a large island opposite the Hampton Water Treatment Works. Historically willow was cultivated on the island for osiers, with the island becoming the site of multiple boatyards and light industry in the late 19th and 20th centuries (see Industry). In 1910, the height of the island's western end was augmented by fill from the excavation of the Stain Hill Reservoirs. The island was connected to the north bank of the Thames by a pedestrian bridge in 1941. Boat building ceased in the 1960s and the boatsheds reverted to light industrial use, including being used as music studios. The boatyards were largely destroyed by fire in 2021.

==== Benn's Island ====
Benn's Island is a small uninhabited island close to the Hampton riverbank below St Mary's Church. In the 19th century the island was occupied by the Thames Valley Sailing Club (since relocated to Sunbury Lock Ait), and since 1945 has been leased by the Hampton Sailing Club.

==== Tagg's Island ====
Tagg's Island is an inhabited private island surrounded by 62 houseboats in a self-styled community of artists and creatives. Historically, the island has been the site of multiple hotel and resort developments, including the Island Hotel established by Thomas Tagg (after whom the island is named), the famous Karsino built by impresario Fred Karno, which, following Karno's bankruptcy, became known as the Thames Riveria under various owners. The island was bought by car manufacturer AC Cars in 1940, who converted the skating rink and tennis courts into factory space for wartime munitions, and later, Invacars for the Ministry of Pensions. The hotel was demolished in 1971. In 1980 houseboat owners Gerry and Gillian Braban bought the island, excavating a lagoon in the centre of the island (increasing the number of houseboats by 20) and rebuilding a road bridge to the north bank.

=== River crossings ===
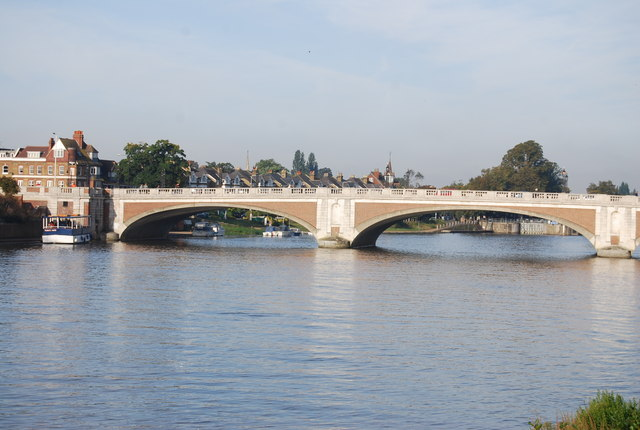
Hampton Court Bridge (showing Hampton Court Palace)

Hampton Ferry has linked Hampton to the south bank of the Thames at Hurst Park, Molesey since at least 1514, and reputedly since the time of the Domesday book.

A ferry had also operated linking Hampton Court to present-day East Molesey since the Tudor period, with a bridge first constructed on the site in 1753. The present-day Hampton Court Bridge, opened in 1933, is the fourth iteration.

=== Locks and river management ===
Hampton lies on the River Thames upstream of Molesey Lock and downstream of Sunbury Lock.

The River Thames has always been a key waterway for the supply of goods along its banks and in and out of London. In the 19th century, barges carrying up to 200 tons of material, hauled by men or horses along tow paths, were a common sight along the Hampton/Molesey Reach and an integral part of the river economy. But as river traffic increased, the ad hoc wooden weirs and dams constructed to maintain the river level became unsatisfactory. A lock was first proposed to manage the shallows at "Kenton Hedge and Sundbury Flatts above" in 1802, but it was not until 1812 that Parliament passed an Act for the construction of a lock, and Molesey Lock was completed in 1815. There had been a weir at Sunbury to divert water for better navigation since 1789, and the first lock was opened in 1812. The lock was rebuilt downstream in 1856 after the Hampton Water Treatment Works were built. A second lock was opened in 1927.

== Local features ==
=== Hampton Water Treatment Works ===
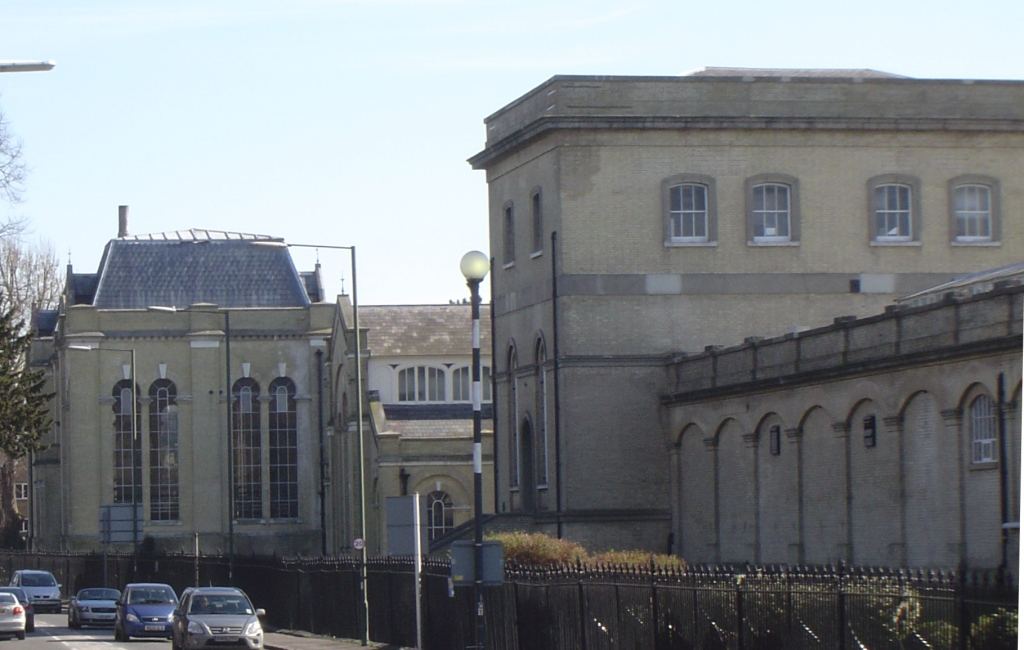
Hampton WTW Victorian buildings on the A308

The Hampton Water Treatment Works, currently owned and operated by Thames Water, occupy a 66 hectare site located between the A308 Upper Sunbury Road and the Thames. The Waterworks were constructed in the late 1850s and 1860s as a joint venture of three London water companies, after the passage of the 1852 Metropolis Water Act which made it unlawful to take drinking water from the tidal Thames below Teddington Lock because of the amount of sewage in the tidal river. The original works were designed by Joseph Quick and J.W. Restler, and the site comprises filter beds and four massive engine pump houses constructed in Gault brick, with large arched windows and decorative balustrades. The Waterworks was in the past a significant local employer, and its brick pumphouses dominate the local landscape. The Waterworks currently has a maximum output of 700 megalitres a day, and supplies about 30% of London's fresh water.

=== Garrick's Villa and Temple to Shakespeare ===
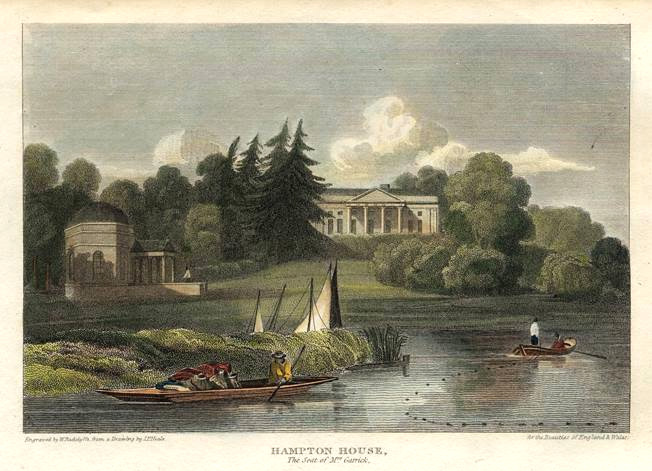
Hampton House, showing Garrick's Villa and Temple to Shakespeare, 1815

==== Garrick's Villa ====
David Garrick, a renowned 18th century actor and playwright, purchased Hampton House, an established country house facing the Thames on the road to Hampton Court, in 1754. Numerous alterations were made to the house during Garrick's residence by the neoclassical architect Robert Adam, including an imposing portico, the building of an orangery and the construction of a tunnel under the road to connect with his riverside lawn. The house became known as Garrick's Villa, and received Grade I listing in 1952.

==== Garrick's Temple to Shakespeare ====
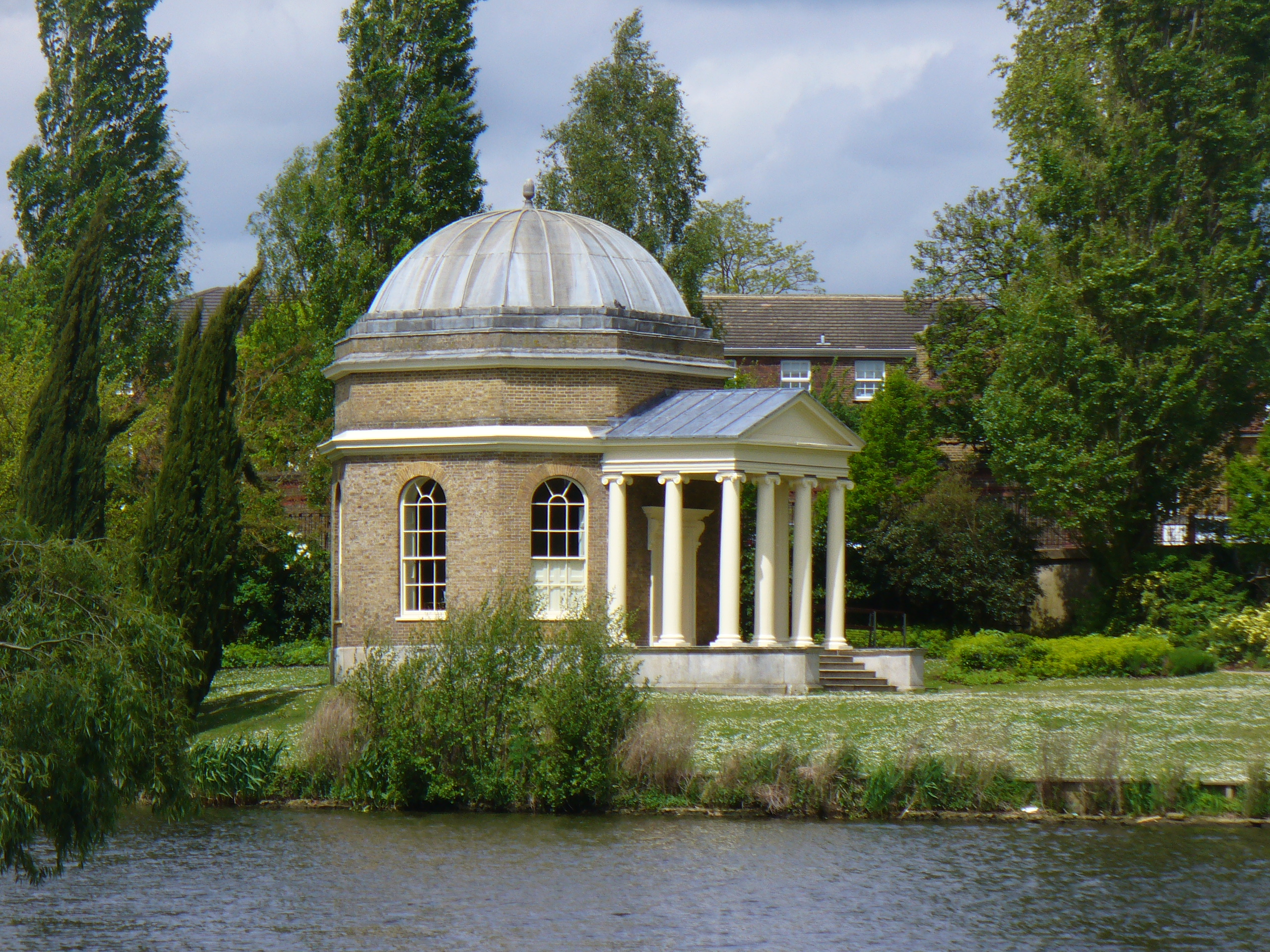
Garrick's Temple to Shakespeare

In 1755 Garrick commissioned an (unknown) architect to construct a garden folly as a temple to his muse, William Shakespeare. The architect designed an octagonal domed building modelled on the Pantheon in the Classical style with an Ionic portico, to be constructed in the villa's riverside garden. The temple's interior was furnished as a shrine to Shakespeare, exhibiting Garrick's collection of Shakespearean relics, and used by Garrick quite place to study, learn lines and entertain guests. Garrick's collection was sold on the death of his widow, but the temple was preserved and restored, becoming known as Garrick's Temple to Shakespeare, and also receiving Grade I listing in 1952. Garrick's Temple is now a museum, concert venue and educational facility, open to the public on Sunday afternoons in the summer.

=== Hampton Court Palace ===
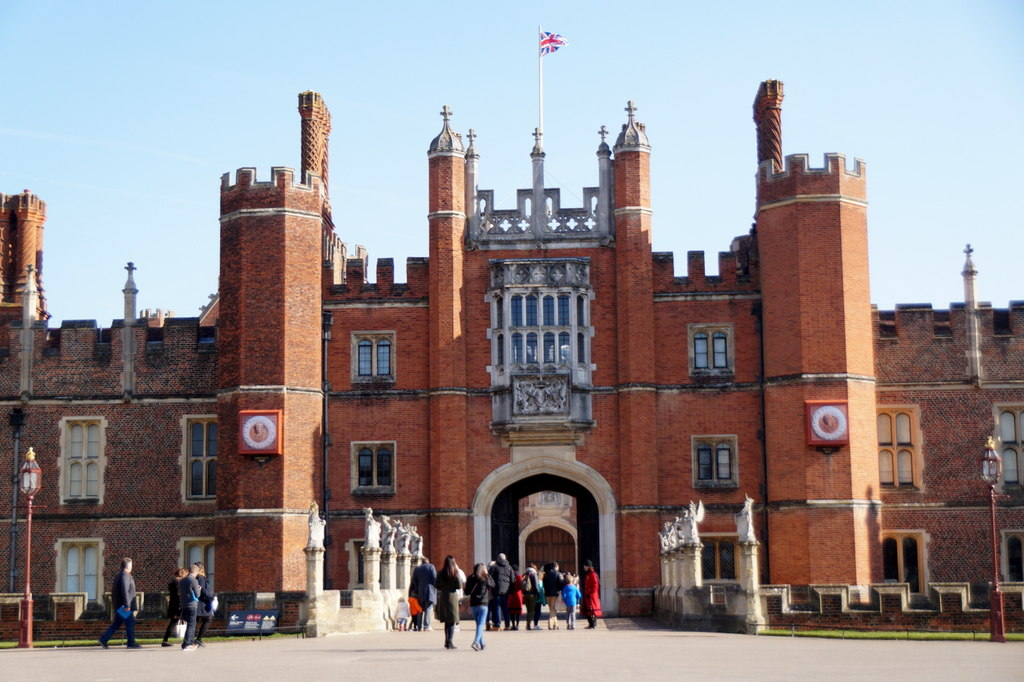
Hampton Court Palace Gatehouse

Cardinal Wolsey began construction in 1514 of a royal palace on the site of Hampton Court formerly occupied by the Knights Hospitaller, which was continued and expanded by Henry VIII after Wolsey's demise in 1530. Hampton Court Palace went on to become a centre of royal power in the Tudor period. The palace underwent extensive renovation in the Baroque style during the reign of William III, designed by Christopher Wren. Queen Victoria opened the palace to the public in 1838 and the site became and remains a major tourist attraction. The palace is managed today by Historic Royal Palaces, an independent charity.

=== Roy Grove cannon and the Anglo-French geodetic survey ===
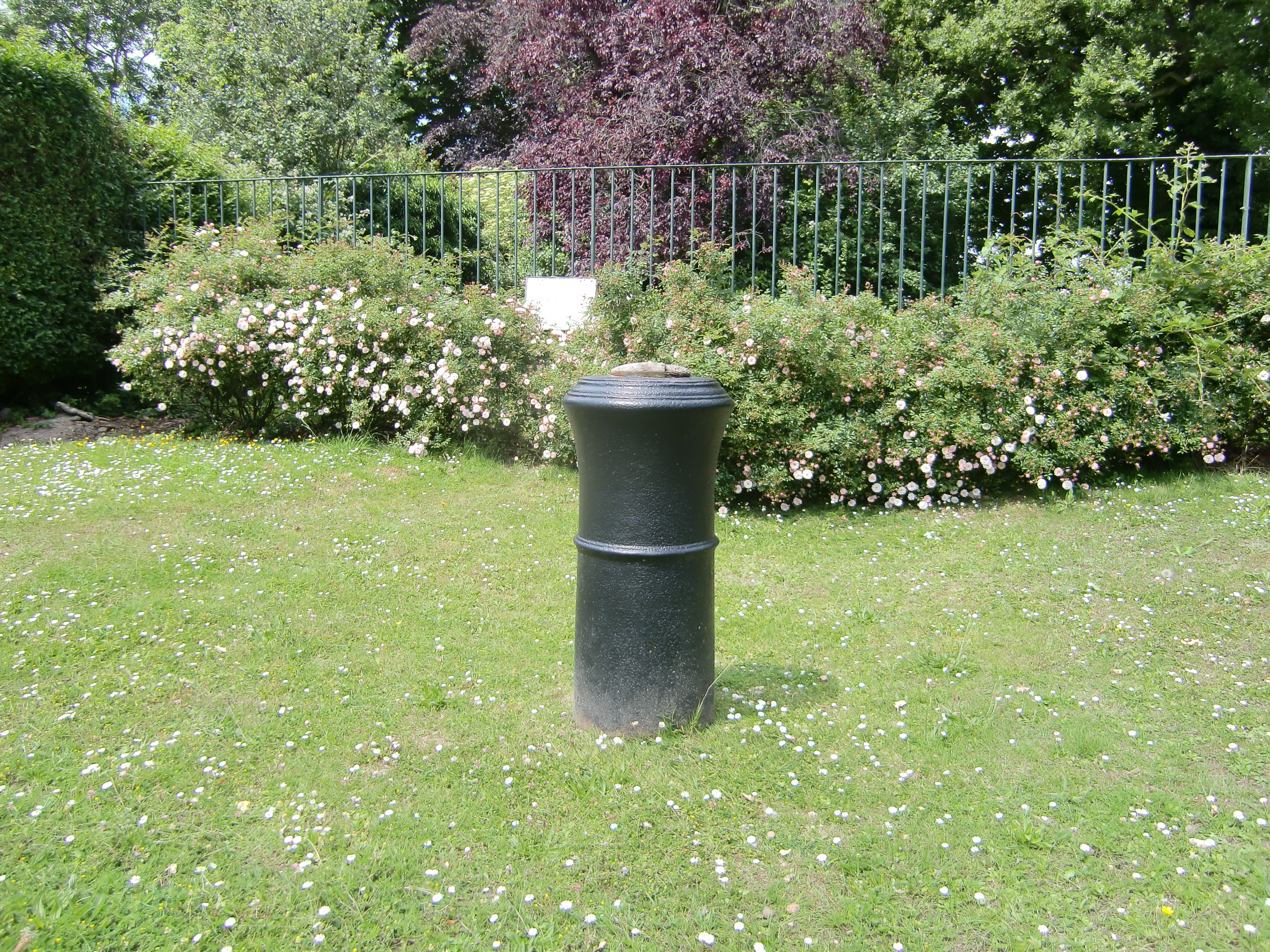
Cannon in Roy Grove Hampton

A cannon in Roy Grove marks the Hampton end of the baseline measured in 1784 by General William Roy in preparation of the Anglo-French Survey (1784–1790) to measure the relative situation of Greenwich Observatory and Paris Observatory. This high precision survey was the forerunner of the Principal Triangulation of Great Britain which commenced in 1791, one year after Roy's death. In the report of the operation Roy gives the locations of the ends of the baseline as Hampton Poor-house and King's Arbour. The latter lies with the confines of Heathrow Airport. The exact end points of the baseline were originally made by two vertical pipes which carried flag-poles but in 1791, when the base was remeasured, the ends were marked by two cannons sunk into the ground.

=== Other notable features ===
==== Rosehill and Hampton Library ====
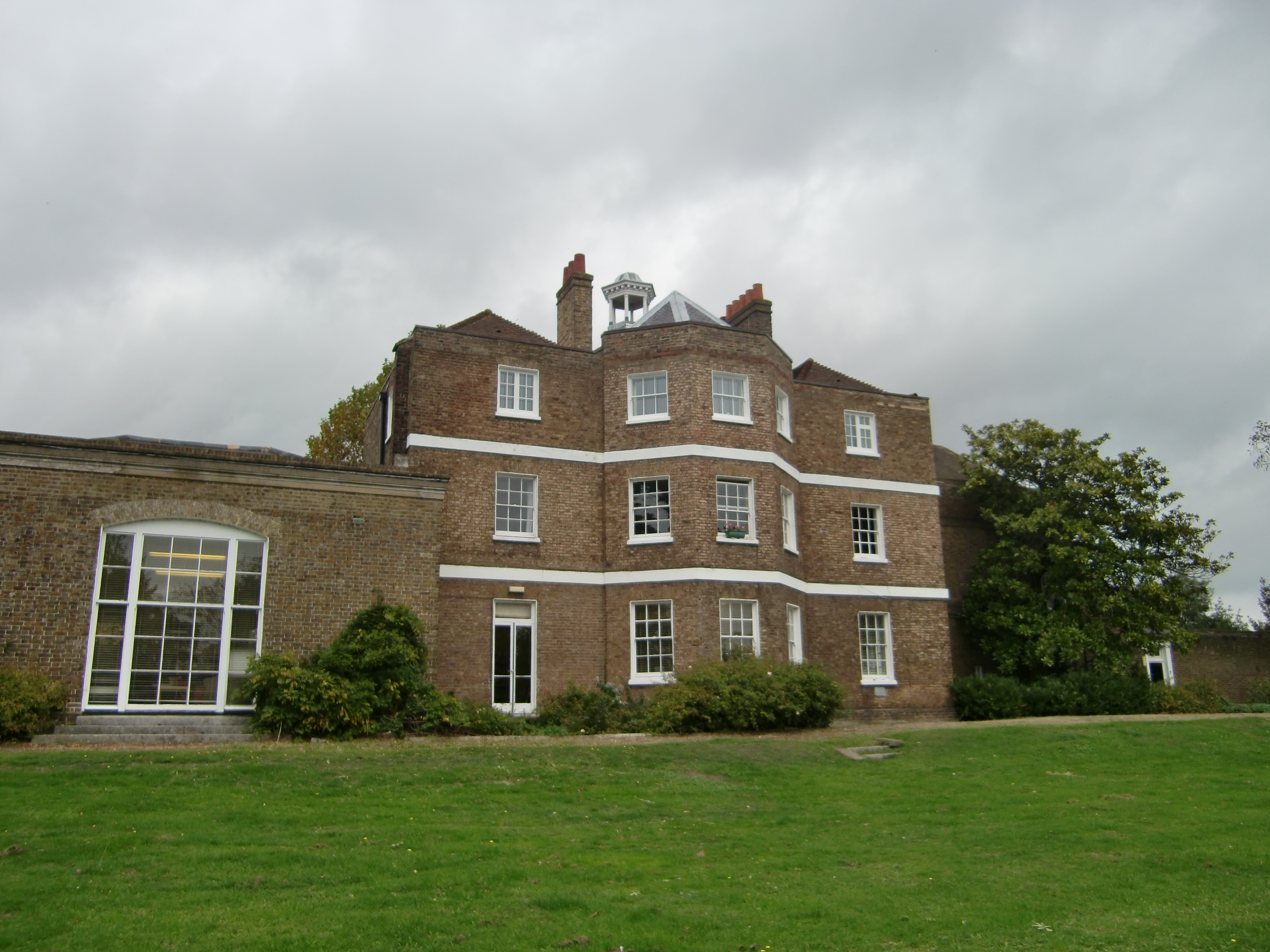
Rosehill (now Hampton Library)

Rosehill is a prominent 18th century Grade II Listed stock-brick built house on the Upper Sunbury Road. Built for the celebrated 18th century tenor John Beard, it was purchased by the Urban District Council (UDC) in 1902 and used as Council Offices and Library until 1937 when Hampton Council was joined with Twickenham and Teddington, and the whole house was given over for use as the Hampton Library. The building sports blue plaques for former residents, the singer John Beard and William Ewart MP, the Politician behind the Public Libraries Act 1850.

==== Pubs and inns ====
The oldest buildings and most longstanding businesses in Hampton are current and former pubs and inns. These include:

- The Feathers. Constructed c. 1540 on the corner of Thames Street and Church Street, The Feathers operated as a pub from c. 1630 until 1792, and was frequented by Samuel Johnson and David Garrick. The building was later converted into cottages, one of which was let to historian Henry Ripley in 1874 (see Hampton and the River Thames), and which remains the oldest surviving building in Hampton.
- The Shipp / The Red Lion. Constructed c. 1660 at No. 1 High Street, (Note: The landlord is recorded as John Fall in 1661.) and renamed in the 1750s, The Red Lion was a focal point for members of London society in the late 19th century, particularly for crowds travelling by ferry to watch horse racing or boxing on Molesey Hurst. Having been gutted by fire (Note: The Hampton Fire Brigade later re-enacted extinguishing the fire. https://player.bfi.org.uk/free/film/watch-fire-at-the-historic-inn-at-hampton-1908-online) the pub was rebuilt in 1909, and closed in 1980.
- The Bell Inn. Located on Thames Street with a prominent view of the river, a pub has operated on the site of The Bell since at least 1557. In 1892 the pub was destroyed by fire and rebuilt in its current mock-Tudor form. The Bell is mentioned in works by Dickens and T.S. Eliot (see Literature).
- Jolly Coopers. Originally called The Glass Bottle, Jolly Coopers has traded at No. 16 High Street since c. 1720, and is Hampton's oldest pub still operating in its original premises.
- The Court Jester / The Hampton / The Hamptons Ale House. The Court Jester opened in November 1980 in the heart of the redeveloped Nurserylands estate (see Modern Hampton). After a fire in 2017 the pub now trades as The Hamptons Ale House.

==== Hampton Youth Project ====
Hampton Youth Project is a youth centre established in Tangley Park in 1990. Built in a converted coach depot on the Nurserylands Estate it offers a wide programme of activities for those aged 11–19.

==== Beveree wildlife site ====
The Beveree Wildlife Site to the north of Station Road is a Site of Local Importance for Nature Conservation. It is a small secluded area of green open space, mixed woodland, self-seeded fruit trees, scrub, two small meadows, and orchard trees.

==== Hampton Cemetery ====
Hampton Cemetery is a cemetery on Hollybush Lane in Hampton. The cemetery was opened in 1879, and fourteen Commonwealth servicemembers of World War I and seven of World War II are buried in the cemetery.

==== Tagg's Island sundial ====
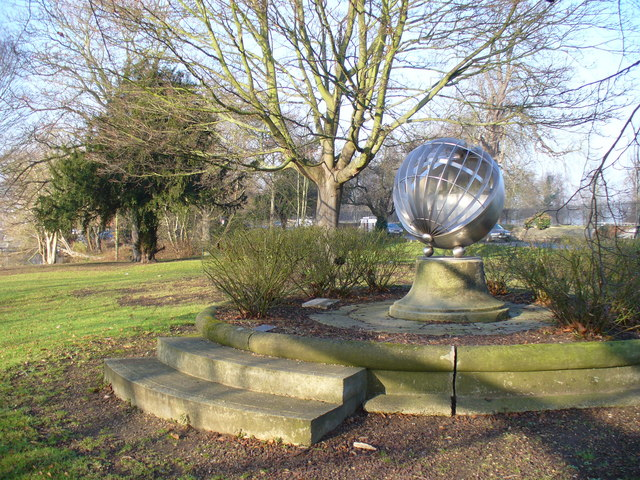
Tagg's Island sundial, in St Albans Riverside park

In the park of St Albans Riverside beside the bridge leading to Tagg's Island is a sundial, "a globe with numbered longitude fins and tropic latitudes, resting on three balls, all upon a bell-shaped base" designed by David Harber.

== Governance ==
Hampton is part of the Twickenham constituency for elections to the House of Commons of the United Kingdom.

Hampton is part of the Hampton and Hampton North wards for elections to Richmond upon Thames London Borough Council.

On 1 April 1937 the civil parish was abolished and merged with Twickenham. At the 1931 census (the last before the abolition of the parish), Hampton had a population of 13,061.

== Sport and leisure ==
=== Football ===
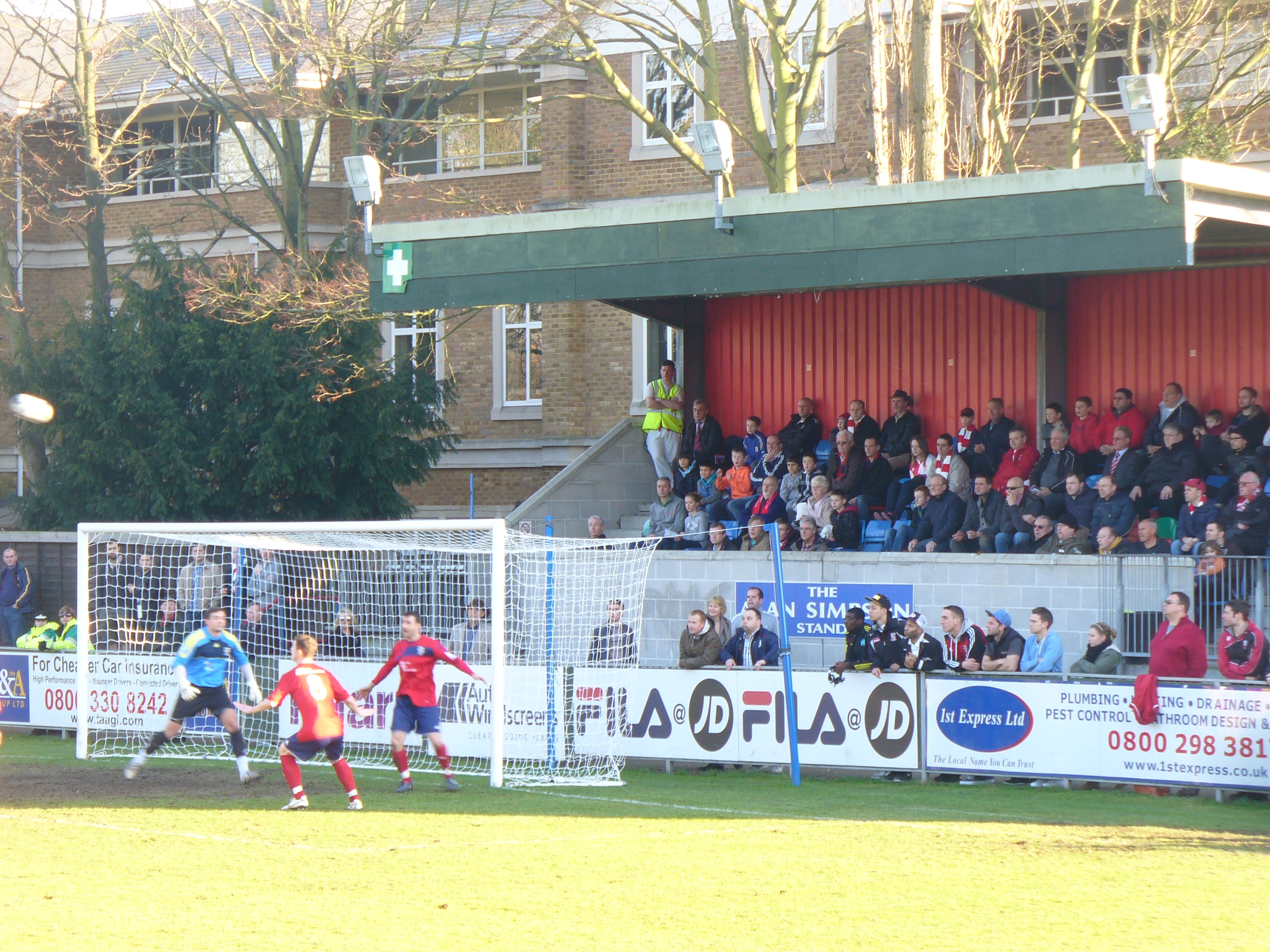
The Alan Simpson Stand, Beveree Stadium

Hampton & Richmond Borough F.C. are a semi-professional club playing at step 2 of Non-League football in the National League South. The club has played at Beveree Stadium (capacity: 3,500) since 1959.

=== Rugby ===
Twickenham Rugby Football Club can trace its establishment to 1867, and moved to its current home ground at Parkfields west of Hampton in 1930.

=== Cricket ===
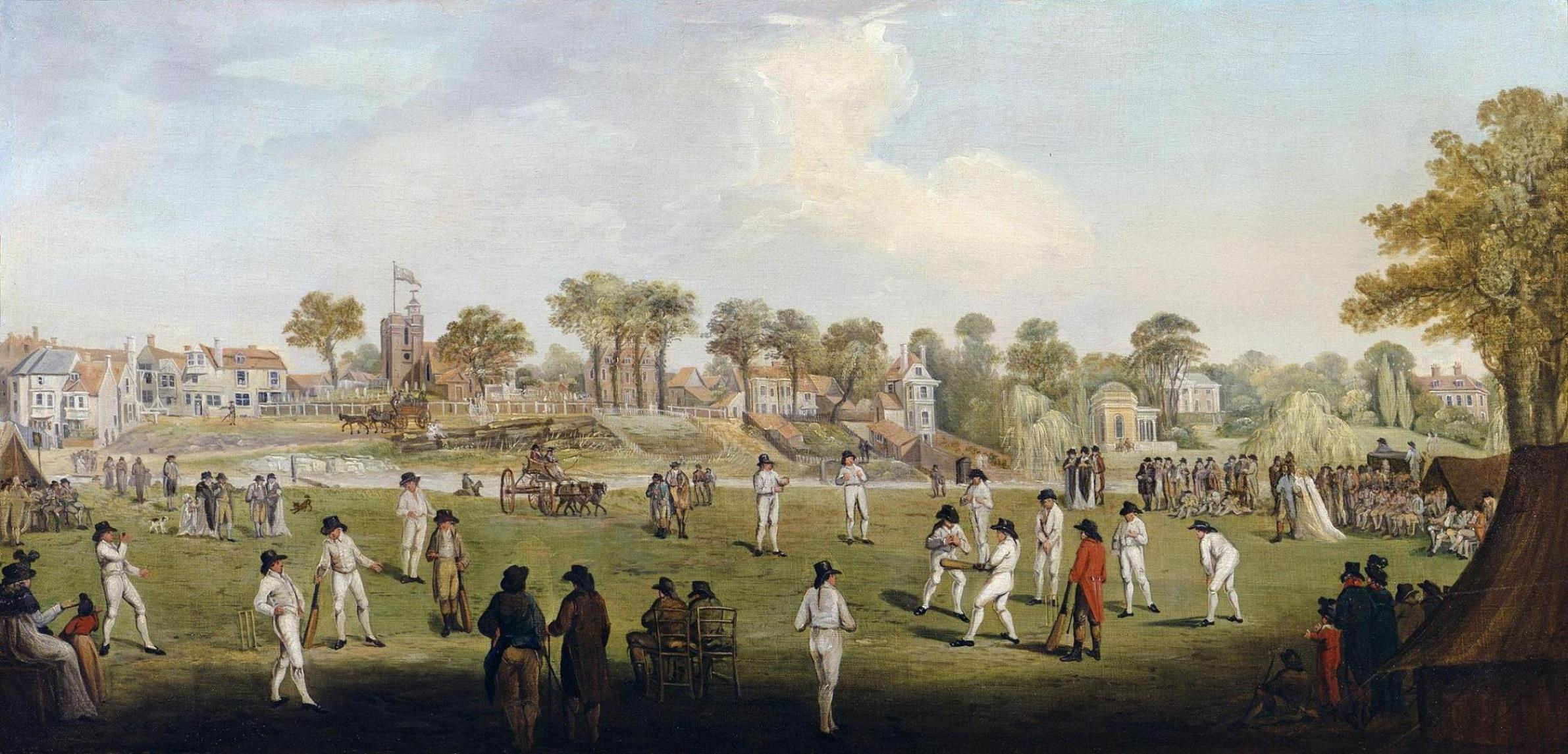
Cricket at Moulsey Hurst c1790

Hampton's first cricket club, the Royal Clarence Cricket Club, was founded in 1828. Sponsored by its patron the Duke of Clarence, the club played its matches on what is now Hurst Park in Molesey.

Hampton Hill Cricket Club was established in 1855 (as New Hampton Cricket Club) and moved to its present ground in Bushy Park in 1890. The club also plays at Carlisle Park in Hampton.

=== Sailing ===
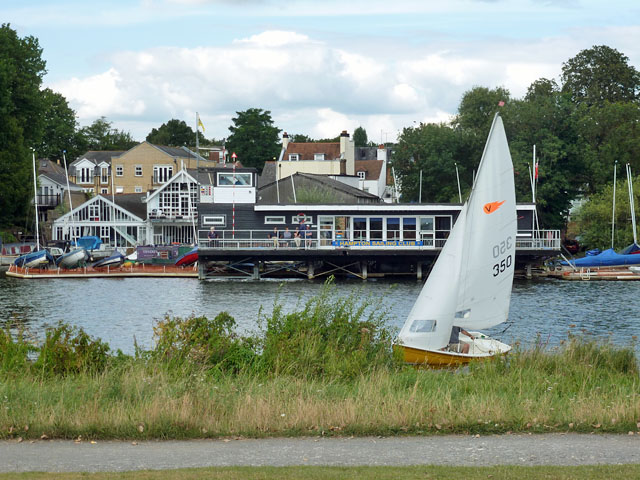
Hampton Sailing Club with boat landing stages occupies all of Benn's Island above Molesey Lock

The River Thames widens at Hampton Reach, and the prevailing south-westerly breeze over Hurst Park makes the river an attractive venue for sailing. Benn's Island was occupied by the Thames Valley Sailing Club in the 19th century, and since 1945 has been leased by the Hampton Sailing Club, which operates a clubhouse and boatyard. The club's racing course runs from upstream of Platt's Eyot down to Tagg's Island.

=== Rowing ===
A Watermen's Regatta was first run at Hampton in 1835, and which ran until 1910, becoming an informal entertainment (including water jousting and canoe polo) in its final years.

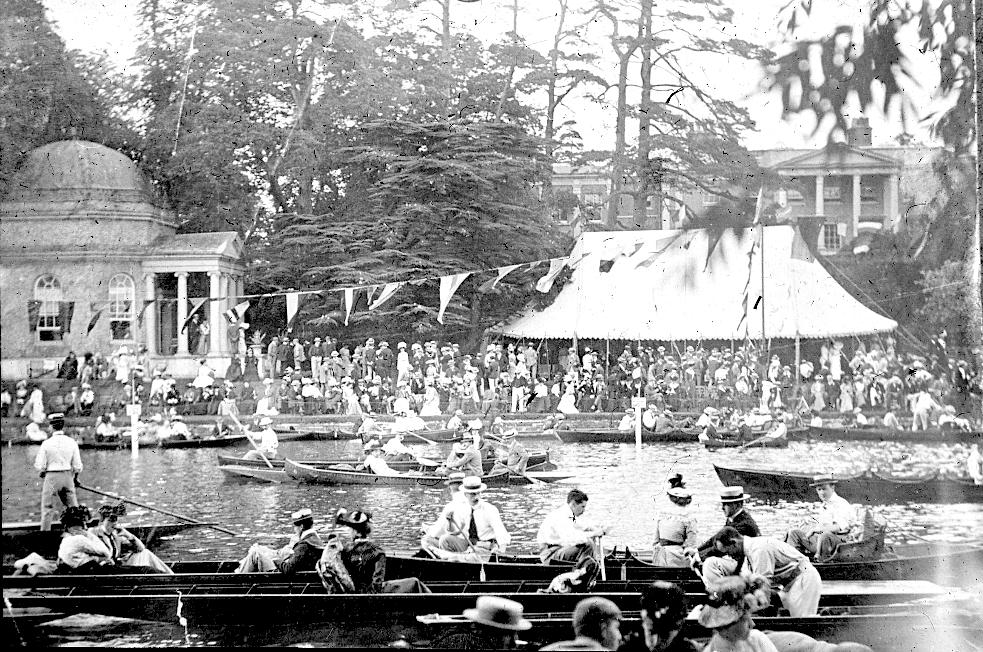
Garrick's Lawn spectators watching the Molesey Regatta 1921

Molesey Boat Club has operated the Molesey Regatta since 1867. For much of its early history, the race course finished downriver from Garrick's Temple, with crowds and officials massing on Garrick's Lawn. The current race course follows an 850-metre course starting upstream of Platt's Eyot and finishing opposite the Waterworks and Hurst Park.

The rowing clubs of Hampton School and Lady Eleanor Holles School jointly operate the Millennium Boathouse, opposite the upstream end of Platt's Eyot on the north bank of the Thames. Both clubs have produced multiple British school champions, competitors in the Oxford and Cambridge Boat Race, and international representatives.

=== Canoeing ===
Originally founded as the Westel Club in 1970, Hampton Canoe Club has operated from the old pumping station at Bell Hill since 1990.

=== Triathlon ===
Thames Turbo Triathlon Club was established in 2012, and is based at Hampton Pool. The club runs an annual triathlon on the first Bank Holiday Monday in May, with the swim leg at Hampton Pool, the cycle course along Hampton Court Road/Lower Sunbury Road/B375 from Hampton Court to Dumsey Meadow, and the run leg in Bushy Park. The club also runs an annual junior aquathlon at Lady Eleanor Holles School in June.

=== Hampton Pool ===
Hampton Heated Open Air Pool and Gym near Bushy Park was built in 1922 after plans approved in 1914 were delayed due to the outbreak of the First World War. A diving pit and filtration system was added in 1939, and the pool widened in 1961. The pool was closed by the council in 1980 due to financial reasons, and re-opened with community support in 1985, with management transferred to a dedicated charity.

== Hampton in art, literature and other media ==
=== Art ===
==== Alfred Sisley and Camille Pissarro ====
Following the outbreak of the Franco-Prussian war some Impressionist artists sought refuge in England. Anglo-French Impressionist painter Alfred Sisley came to England in 1874 at the invitation of baritone Jean-Baptist Faure, settling in Hampton Court in the summer and painting a series of paintings along the banks of the River Thames around Hampton Court and Molesey. Regatta at Molesey near Hampton Court features the Molesey Regatta, with the recently constructed Island Hotel visible on Tagg's Island in the background. The Thames with Hampton Church shows the view up river from Molesey towards Hampton, featuring St Mary's Church and Garrick's Temple to Shakespeare. French Impressionist painter Camille Pissarro first visited London in 1870, and made further visits throughout his lifetime. During a short visit to visit his son George in May–June 1890 Pissarro painted six canvases of various London outdoor scenes (including Charing Cross Bridge, Old Chelsea Bridge and Primrose Hill, London). Among these works was Hampton Court Green, depicting a cricket match on the green.

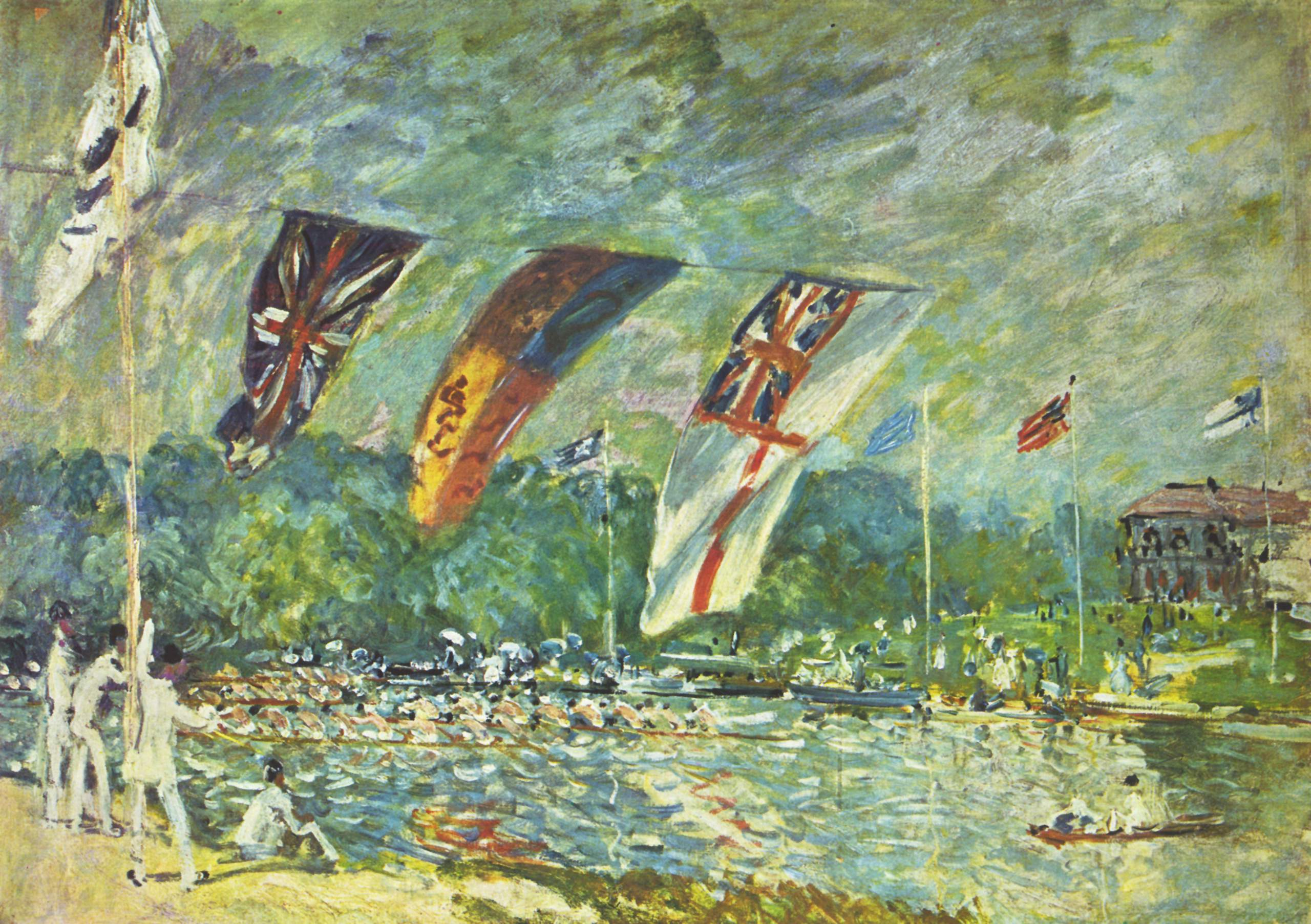
Regatta at Molesey near Hampton Court (1874)

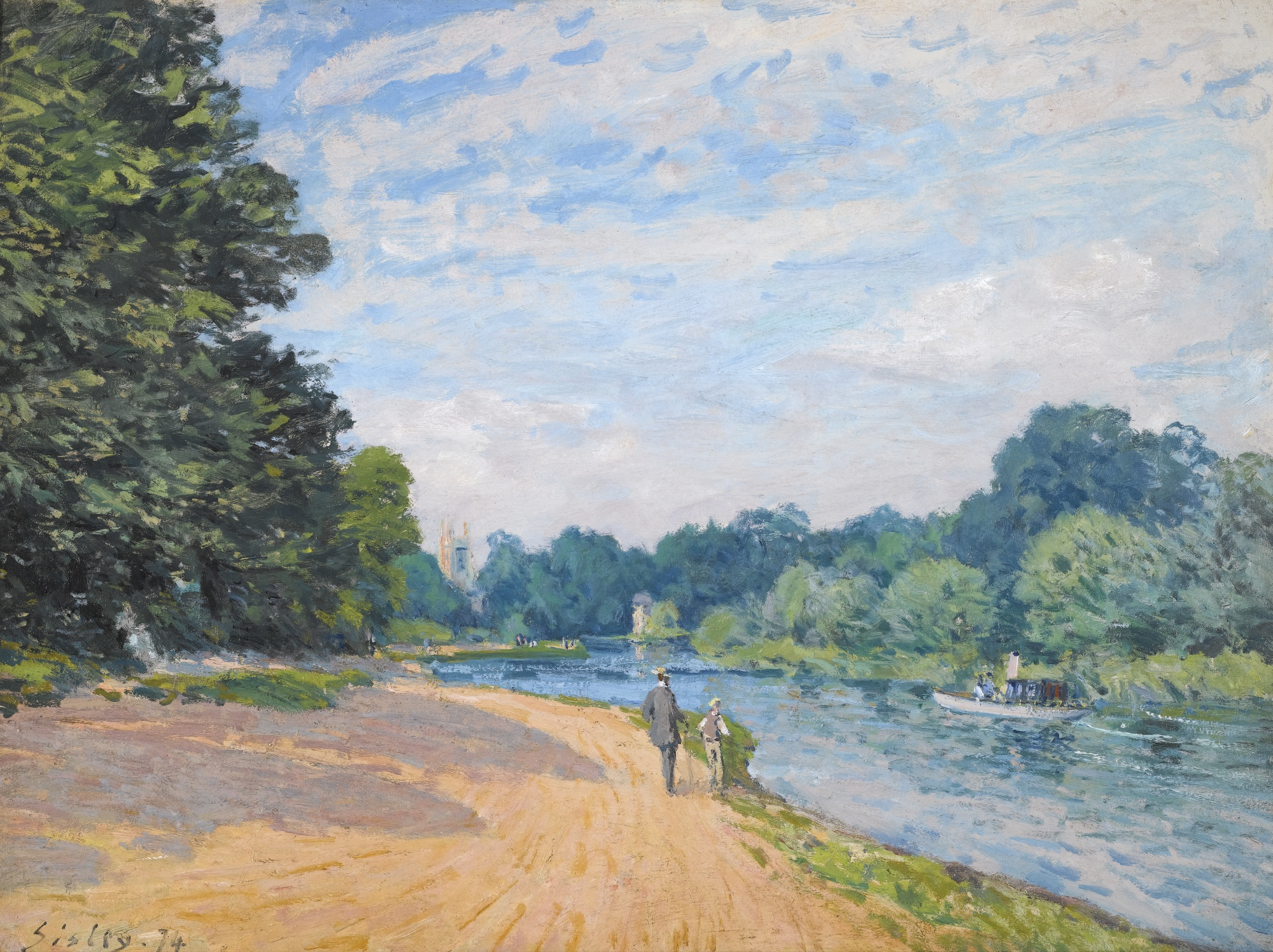
The Thames with Hampton Church (1874)

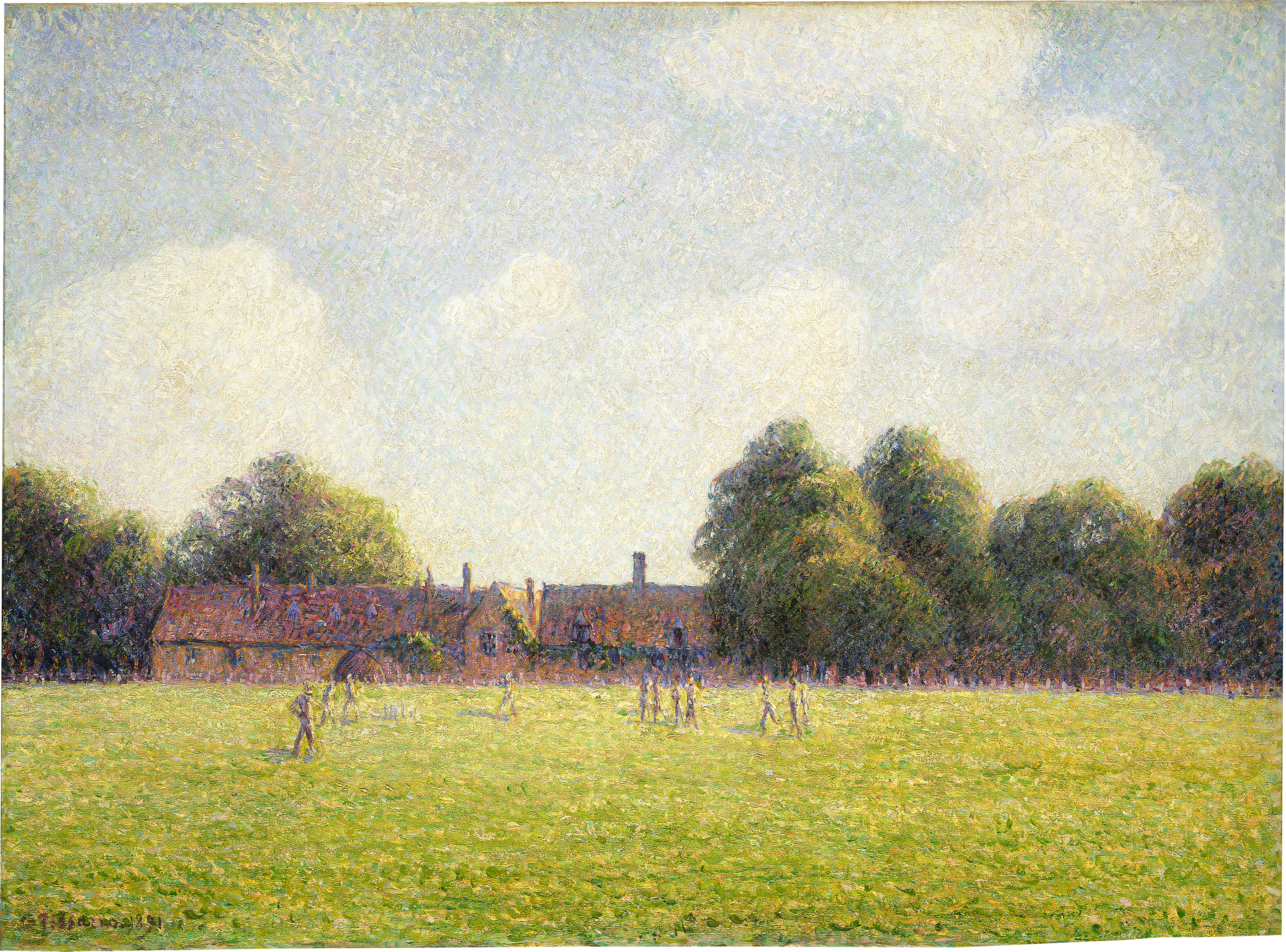
Hampton Court Green (1891)

=== Literature ===
==== Anthony Trollope ====
The 1857 novel The Three Clerks by Anthony Trollope is set in Hampton, which was then a village on the western outskirts of London.

There are still, however, some nooks within reach of the metropolis which have not been be-villaged and be-terraced out of all look of rural charm, and the little village of Hampton, with its old-fashioned country inn, and its bright, quiet, grassy river, is one of them... — Anthony Trollope, The Three Clerks

==== Charles Dickens ====
Hampton features in two Charles Dickens novels. In Oliver Twist, Oliver and Bill Sikes stop in a public house in Hampton on their way to the planned burglary in Chertsey.

They turned round to the left, a short way past the public-house; and then, taking a right-hand road, walked on for a long time: passing many large gardens and gentlemen's houses on both sides of the way, and stopping for nothing but a little beer, until they reached a town. Here against the wall of a house, Oliver saw written up in pretty large letters, "Hampton." They lingered about, in the fields, for some hours. At length, they came back into the town; and, turning into an old public-house with a defaced sign-board, ordered some dinner by the kitchen fire. — Charles Dickens, Oliver Twist

In Nicholas Nickleby, Sir Mulberry Hawk and Lord Frederick visit the 'Hampton Races', which refers to a racecourse at 'Moulsey Hurst'.

The little race-course at Hampton was in the full tide and height of its gaiety; the day as dazzling as day could be; the sun high in the cloudless sky, and shining in its fullest splendour. Every gaudy colour that fluttered in the air from carriage seat and garish tent op, shone out in its gaudiest hues. Old dingy flags grew new again, faded gilding was re-burnished, stained rotten canvas looked a snowy white, the very beggars' rags were freshened up, and sentiment quite forgot its charity in its fervent admiration of poverty so picturesque. — Charles Dickens, Nicholas Nickleby

==== H.G. Wells ====
H.G. Wells moved to Woking in 1895 after his marriage to Catherine Robbins. Wells planned and wrote The War of the Worlds while living in Woking, which mentions Hampton Court in Chapter 14 of Part I:

There's hosts of people driving into Kingston in traps and carts and things, with boxes of valuables and all that", he said. "They come from Molesey and Weybridge and Walton, and they say there's been guns heard at Chertsey, heavy firing, and that mounted soldiers have told them to get off at once because the Martians are coming. We heard guns firing at Hampton Court station, but we thought it was thunder. What the dickens does it all mean? The Martians can't get out of their pit, can they?” My brother could not tell him. — H.G. Wells, War of the Worlds

==== T.S. Eliot ====
In 1936, T.S. Eliot sought respite from the intrigues of London's literary circles (and his wife Vivien) by holing up at the Bell Inn in Hampton, writing to his editor John Hayward under the nom-de-plume 'White Cargo'. Eliot's residence at the Bell Inn led to a reference in Old Possum's Book of Practical Cats.

His bucko mate, Grumbuskin, long since had disappeared,

For the Bell at Hampton he had gone to wet his beard;

And his bosun, Tumblebrutus, he too had stol'n away-

In the yard behind the Lion he was prowling for his prey. — T.S. Eliot, Old Possum's Book of Practical Cats

==== Jerome K. Jerome ====
Hampton is also mentioned in humorist Jerome K. Jerome's Three Men in a Boat.

=== Other media ===
In 24: Live Another Day terrorist Margot Al-Harazi's first hideout is stated to be in Hampton.

The streetscape on Station Road, Hampton near the old Police Station has been used as a backdrop for TV series including Fleabag and The Gold.

== Notable inhabitants ==
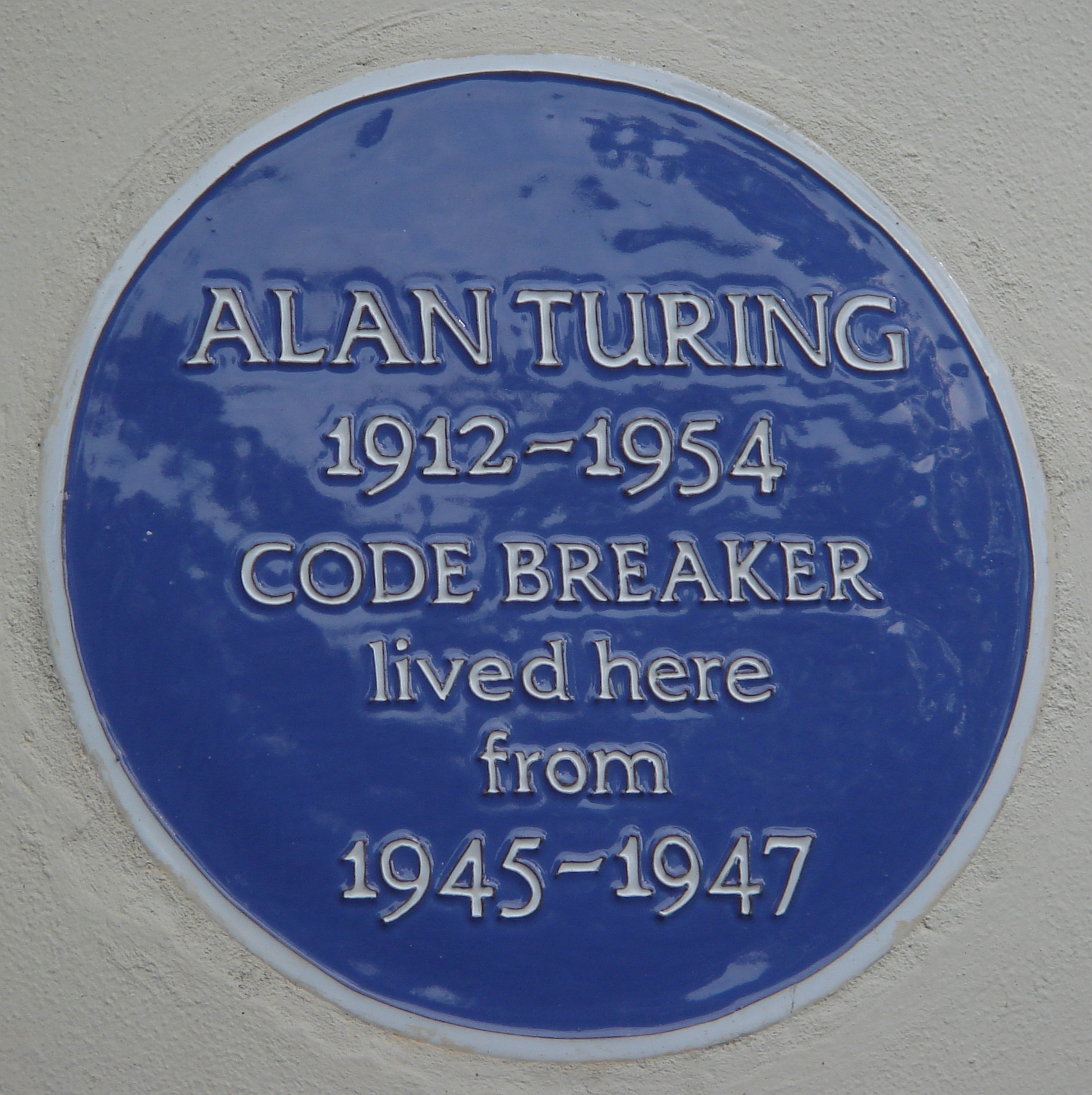
Blue plaque to Alan Turing at 78 High Street, Hampton

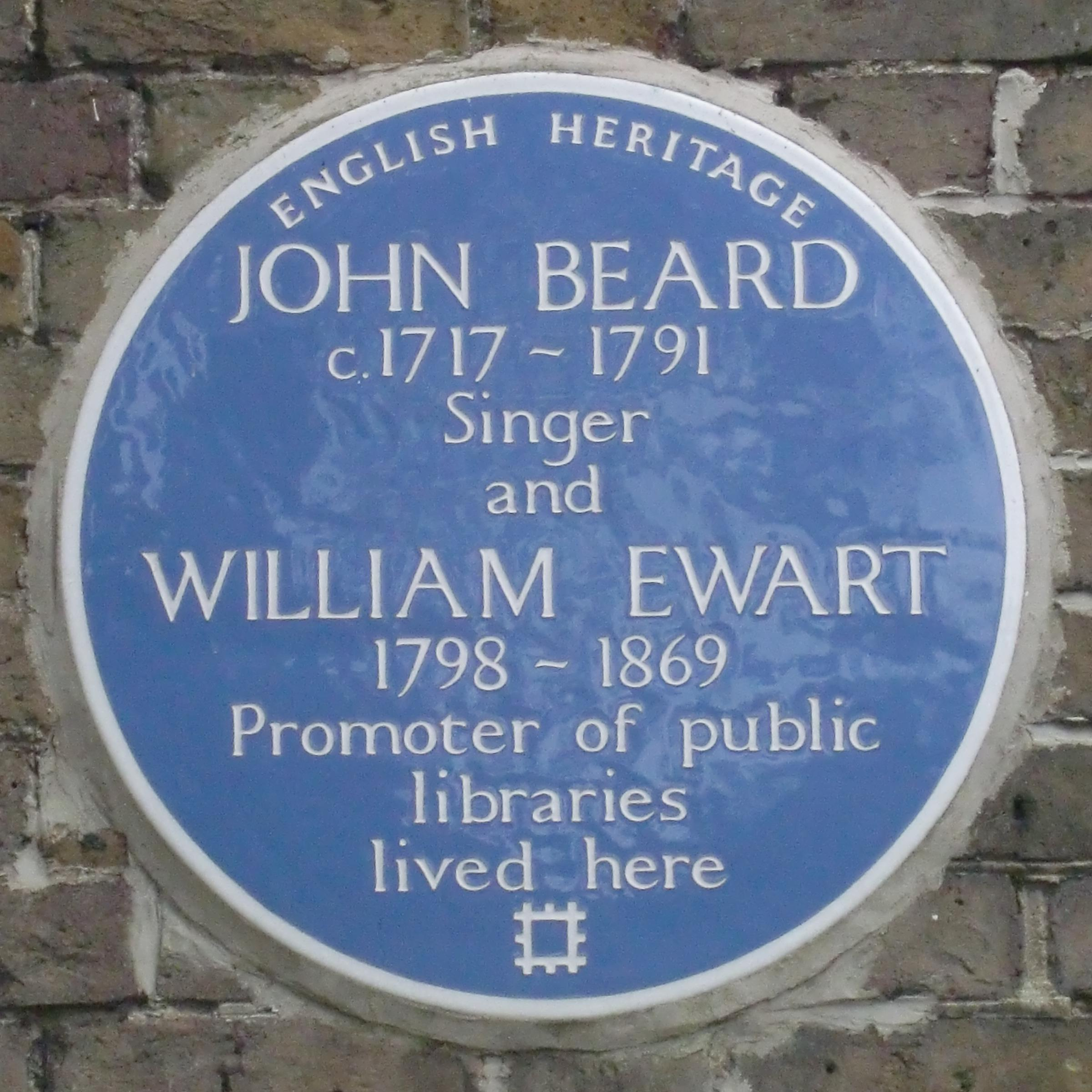
Blue plaque to John Beard and William Ewart, at Hampton Library, Hampton

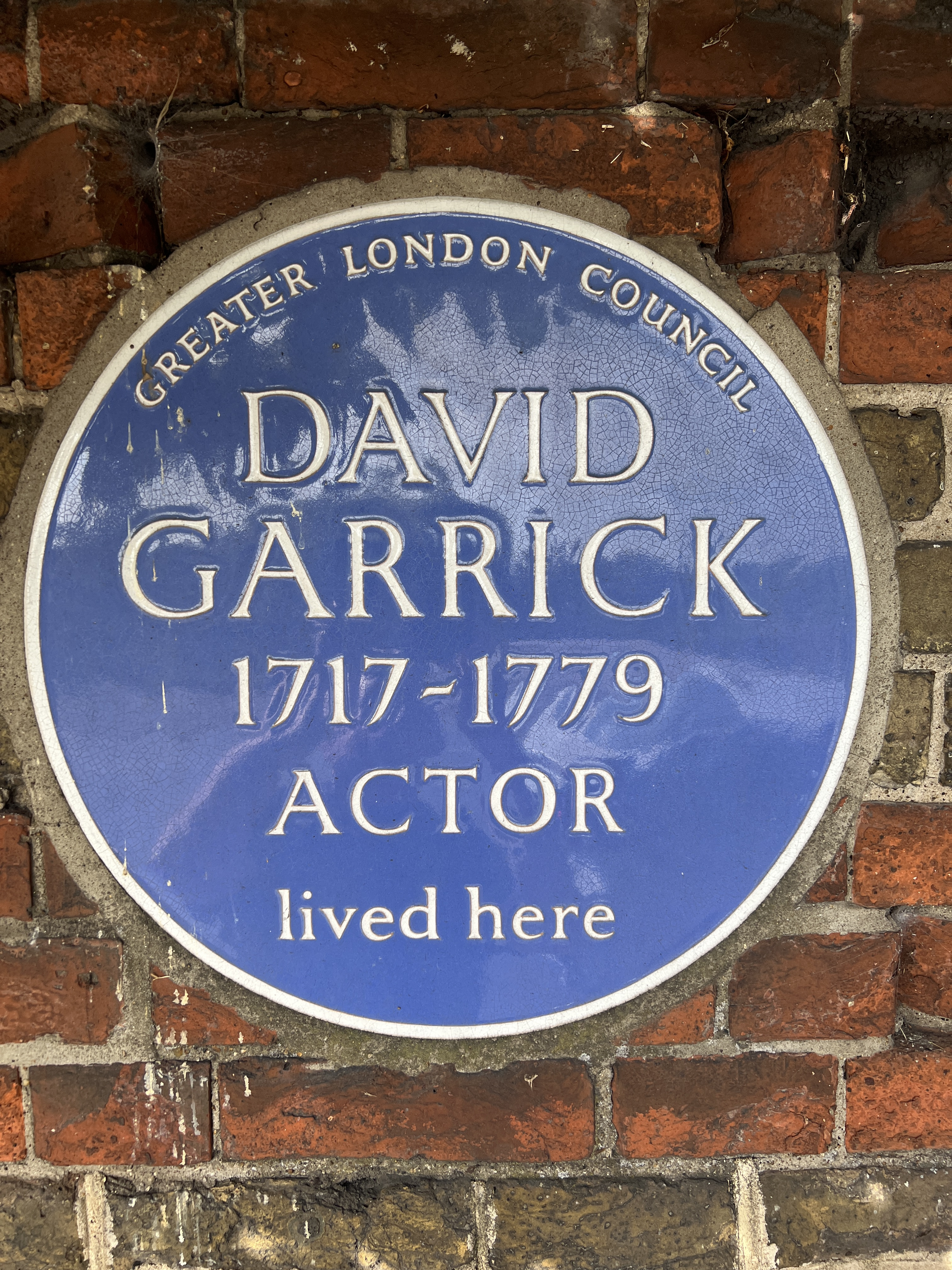
Blue plaque for actor David Garrick, at Garrick Villa, Hampton

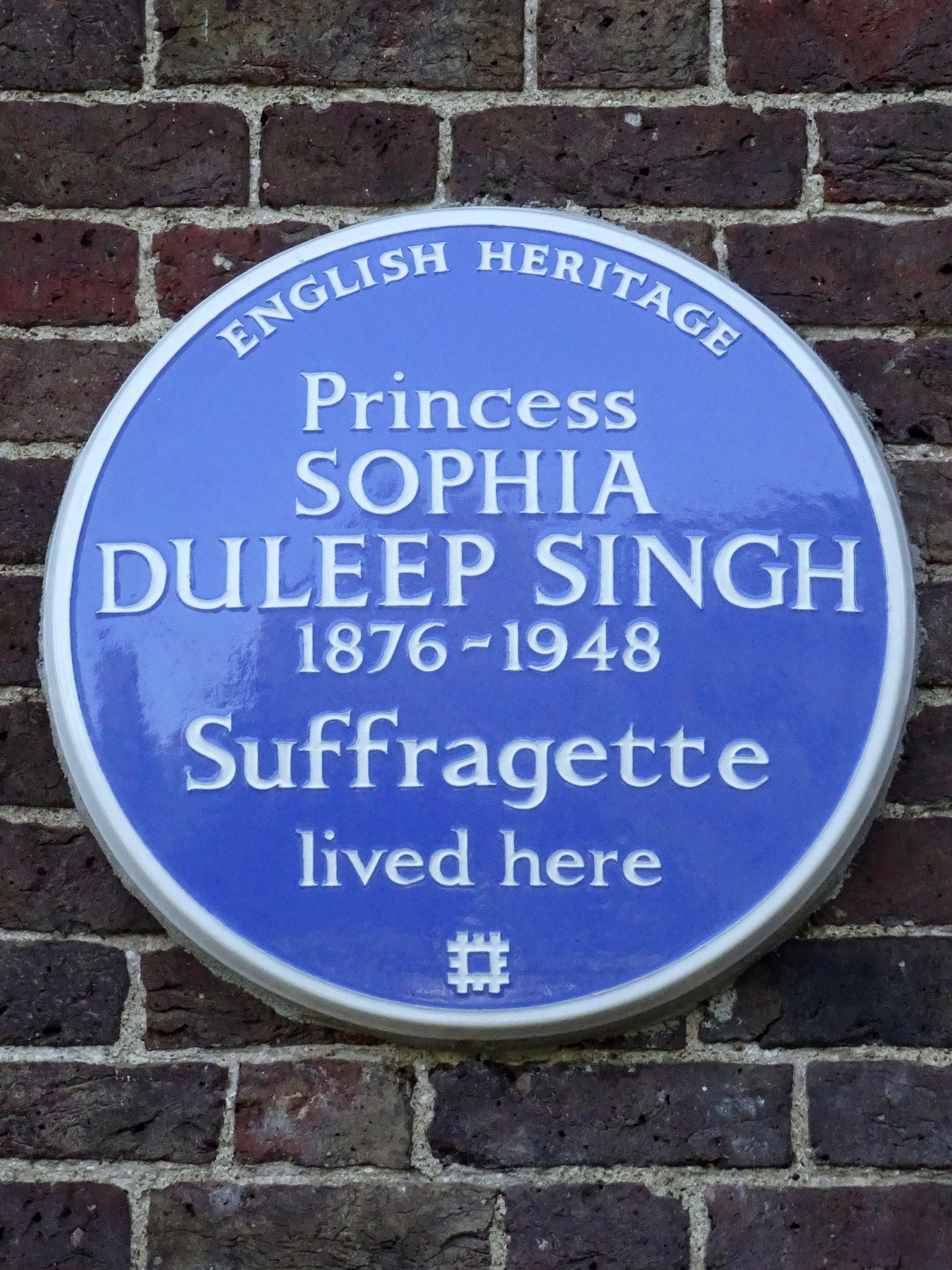
Blue plaque for suffragette Sophia Duleep Singh, at Faraday House, Hampton Court

Blue plaques of notable residents of Hampton

=== Living people ===
- Evgeny Lebedev, the Baron Lebedev, of Hampton in the London Borough of Richmond upon Thames and of Siberia in the Russian Federation, owner of Stud House
- Hayley Mills (born 1946), actress, lived on Belgrade Road, in Hampton with her son Crispian Mills (born 1973), singer, songwriter, guitarist and film director
- Bill Milner (born 1995), actor, lives with his family in Hampton
- Brian May (born 1947), musician and astrophysicist, born in Hampton

=== Historical figures ===
==== Residents of Hampton and Hampton Court ====
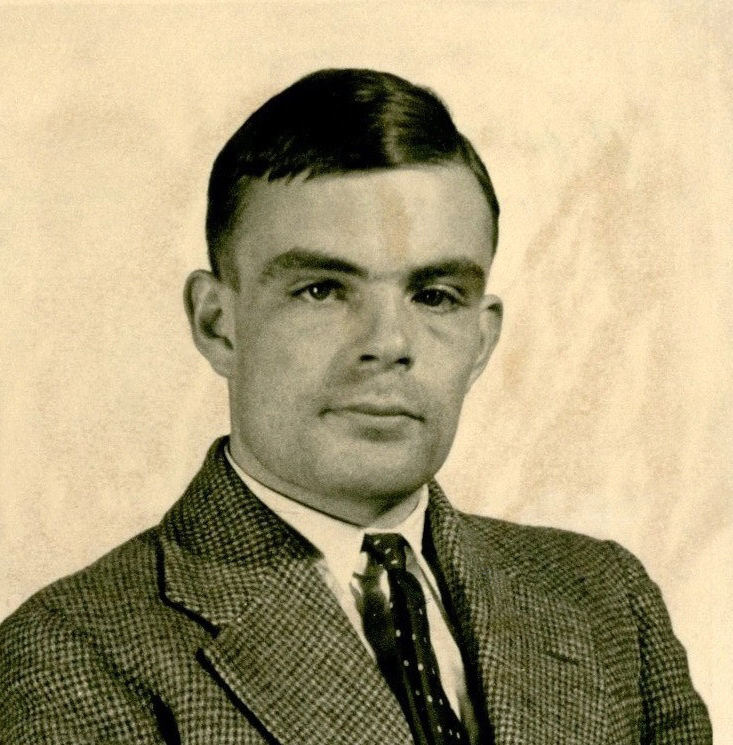
Alan Turing

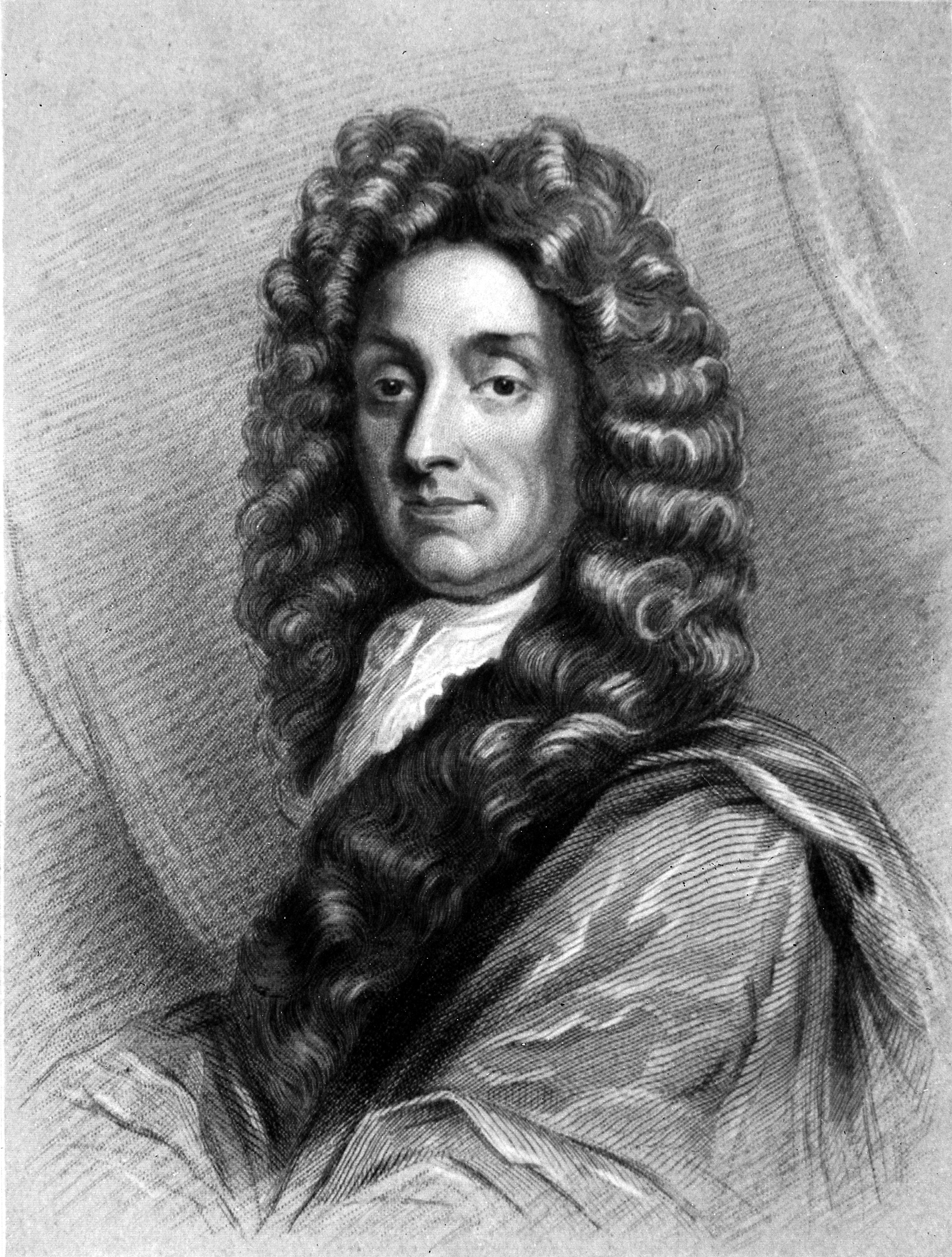
Christopher Wren

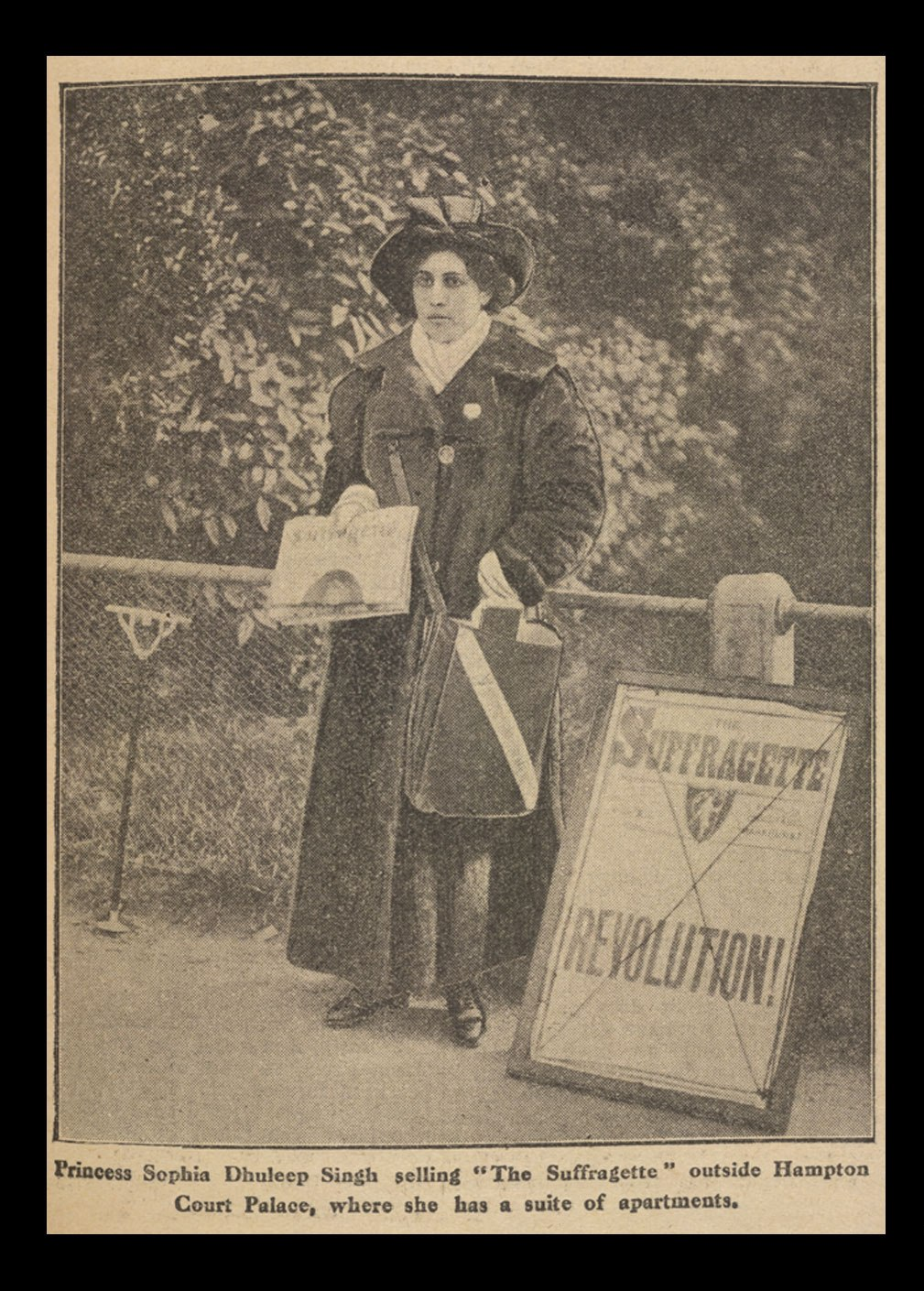
Sophia Duleep Singh

Jessie Matthews

- John Beard (c.1717–1791), tenor singer, lived at what is now Hampton Branch Library, Rose Hill, Hampton. The site is marked by a blue plaque.
- R D Blackmore (1825–1900), novelist, author of Lorna Doone, lived at 25 Lower Teddington Road, Hampton Wick, whilst he had Gomer House in Teddington (since demolished) built for him.
- John Blow (1649–1708), composer, built a house for himself in the High Street. It was demolished in 1799 and was on the site of the present-day house known as Beveree.
- Julian Bream (1933–2020), lutenist and classical guitarist, grew up in Hampton.
- Sir Richard Doll (1912–2005), epidemiologist, was born in Hampton.
- William Ewart (1798–1791), promoter of public libraries, lived at what is now Hampton Branch Library, Rose Hill, Hampton. The site is marked by a blue plaque.
- Michael Faraday (1791–1867) was granted the grace and favour residence now known as Faraday House (formerly on the site of the Master Mason's Lodge opposite Hampton Court Green) by Queen Victoria, where he lived out his final years.
- Sir Francis Mark Farmer (1866–1922), a dental surgeon who worked on facial reconstruction, lived in Belgrade Road.
- David Garrick (1717–1779), actor, lived at Garrick's Villa, Hampton Court Road, Hampton.
- Harry Hampton (1870–1922) recipient of the Victoria Cross, was born in Crown Terrace, Richmond and died in Twickenham. He is buried in Richmond Old Cemetery.
- Norman Cyril Jackson (1919–1994) recipient of the Victoria Cross, died in Hampton Hill and is buried in Twickenham Cemetery.
- W. E. Johns (1893–1968) was an English First World War pilot, and writer of the Biggles stories, who died at Park House, Hampton Court.
- Edward Lapidge (1779–1860), who held the post of County Surveyor of Surrey and designed the present Kingston Bridge, was born in Hampton Wick, where he also designed a number of churches.
- Jessie Matthews (1907–1981), famous actress, singer and dancer from the 1920s to the post-WWII era, resided at The Old House, Marlborough Road, Hampton.
- Vic Mitchell (1934–2021), author and publisher, was born in Hampton.
- Thomas Rosoman (1781–1782), founder of Sadler's Wells Theatre, lived at Jessamine House, Thames Street. (Note: Jessamine House, located on Thames Street, was demolished in 1957.)
- Princess Sophia Duleep Singh (1876–1948), British suffragette, daughter of deposed Maharaja Duleep Singh, and goddaughter of Queen Victoria, was granted a grace and favour residence by the Queen at Faraday House (then part of the Hampton Court estate) in 1896. The site is marked by a blue plaque.
- John Templeton (1802–1886), opera singer, lived at 114 High Street, Hampton Hill.
- Alan Turing (1912–1954) lived at Ivy House (which now has a blue plaque) in Hampton High Street between 1945 and 1947 while working at the National Physical Laboratory in Teddington.
- Sir Christopher Wren (1632–1723), lived at The Old Court House, Hampton Court Green. The site is marked by a blue plaque.

The graveyard within the churchyard of St Mary's Church holds the tombs and graves of various notable individuals from the 17th to 20th centuries.

== Local amenities ==
=== Education ===
As a predominantly residential suburb, Hampton has a significant number of primary and secondary schools.

==== Secondary schools ====
- Hampton High (previously Hampton Academy, Hampton Community College, Rectory School), a co-educational academy
- Turing House School, a co-educational academy (temporary site 2018–2022)
- Hampton School, an independent school for boys
- Lady Eleanor Holles School, an independent school for girls
- Hampton Court House, an independent co-educational school

==== Primary and infants schools ====
- Hampton Junior School
- Hampton Infant School and Nursery
- Hampton Hill Junior School
- Carlisle Infants School
- Buckingham Primary School
- Hampton Prep School (formerly Denmead), the junior school for Hampton School
- Twickenham Prep School
- Jack & Jill School (incorporating Nightingale House and Clarence House)
- St Mary's Hampton CE Primary School

=== Churches ===
Church buildings are a significant presence in the area, with the listed St Mary's Church and St James's Church standing out against the surrounding 20th century housing.

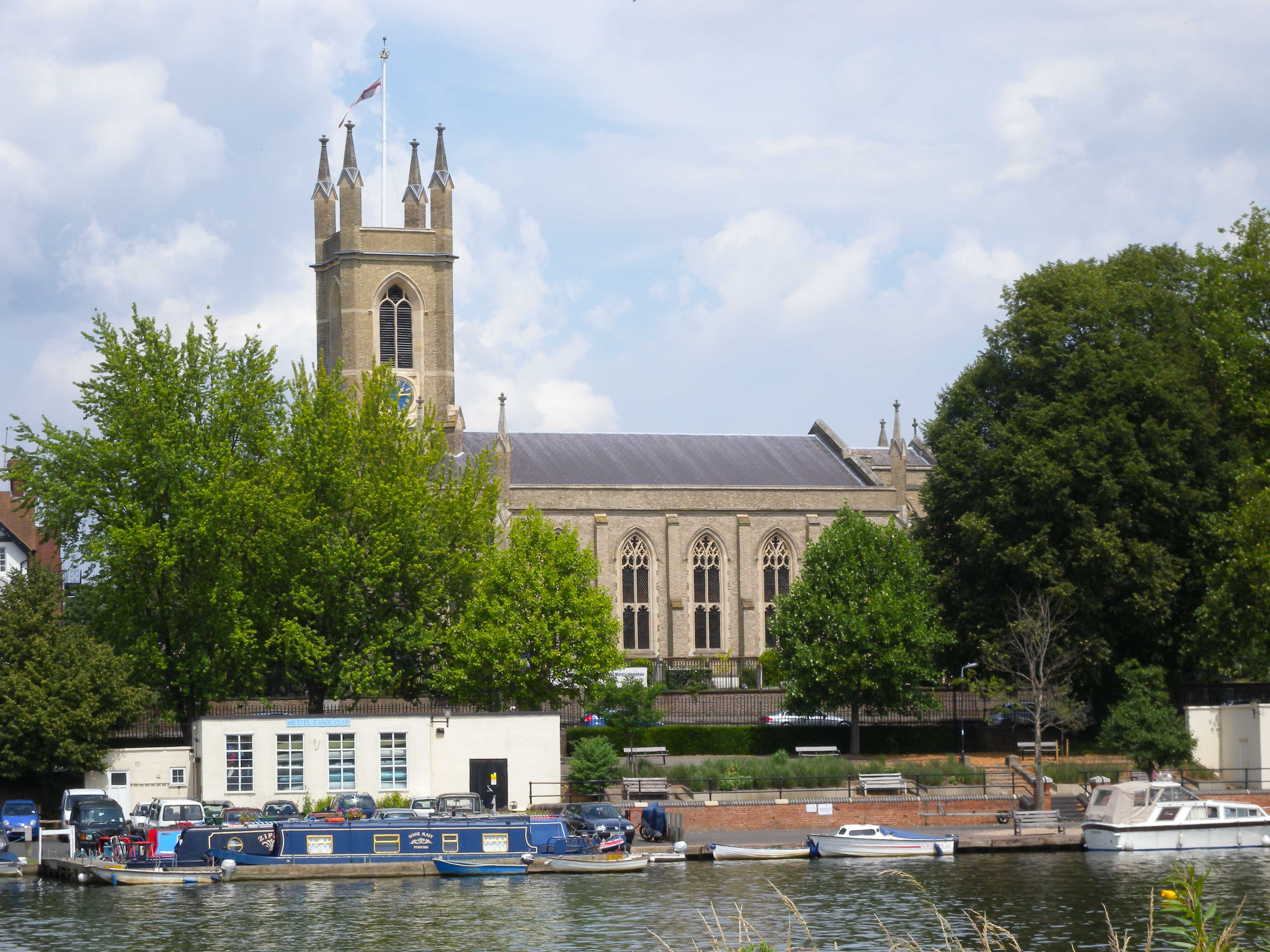
St Mary's Parish Church, Hampton

Local churches include:

- Hampton Methodist Church, Hampton (incorporating Hampton Baptist Church).
- Hampton Hill United Reformed Church, Hampton Hill
- St Theodore's Roman Catholic Church, Hampton
- St Francis de Sales, Hampton Hill and Upper Teddington (Roman Catholic)
- All Saints (Church of England), Old Farm Road, Hampton
- St Mary (Church of England), Church Street (by Thames Street) Hampton
- St James' Church, Hampton Hill (Church of England)

The Christian churches in Hampton and Hampton Hill work together as Churches Together around Hampton.

=== Transport ===
Roads

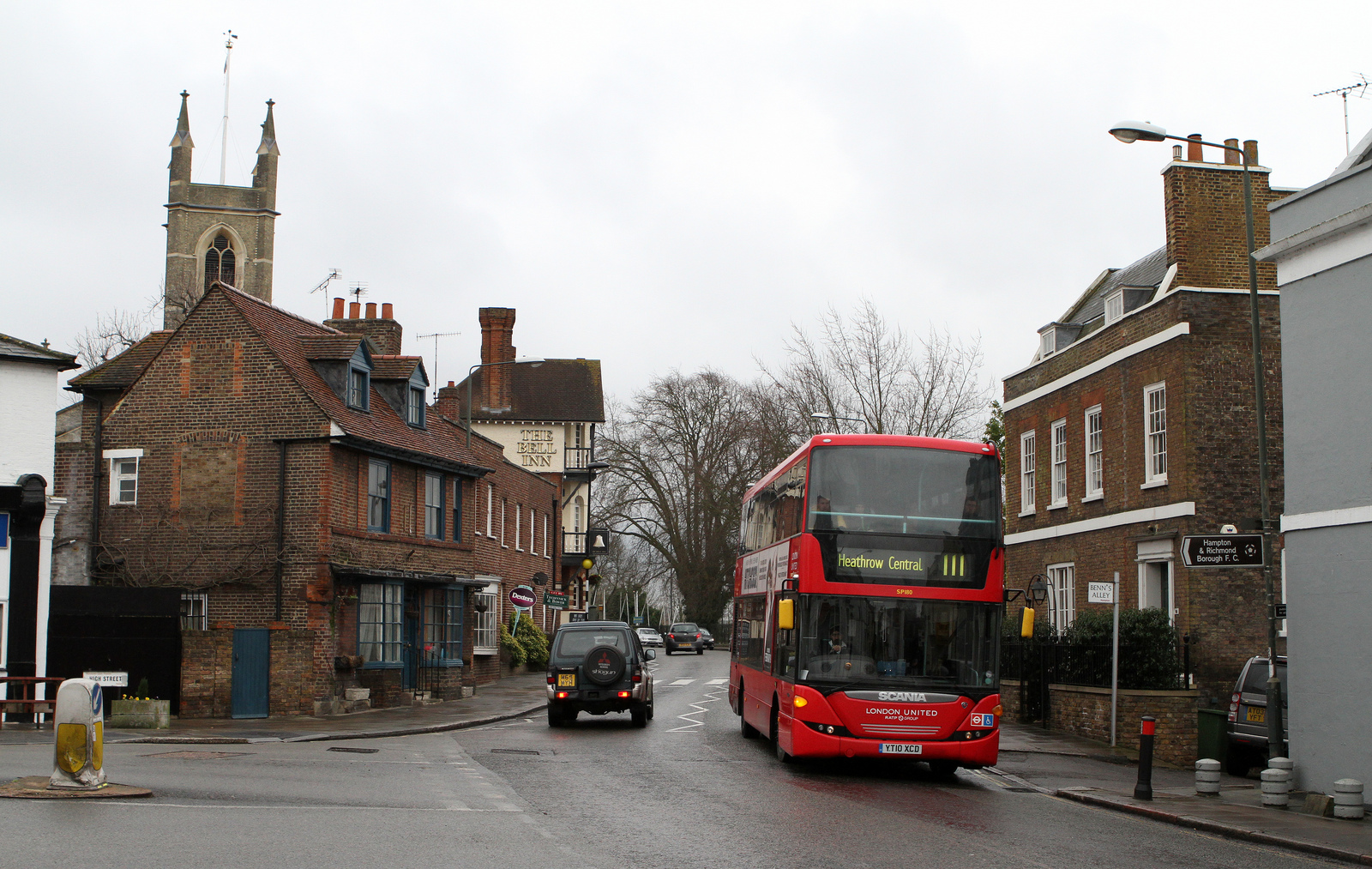
Thames Street, Hampton (including the 111 bus)

In keeping with its lack of high rise buildings, the district has no dual carriageways, its main routes the A308 and A312, have in their busiest sections an additional filter or bus lane.

Bus routes that serve Hampton are the 111, 216, R68 and R70. The 411 and 285 serve Hampton Court and Hampton Hill respectively.

Rail

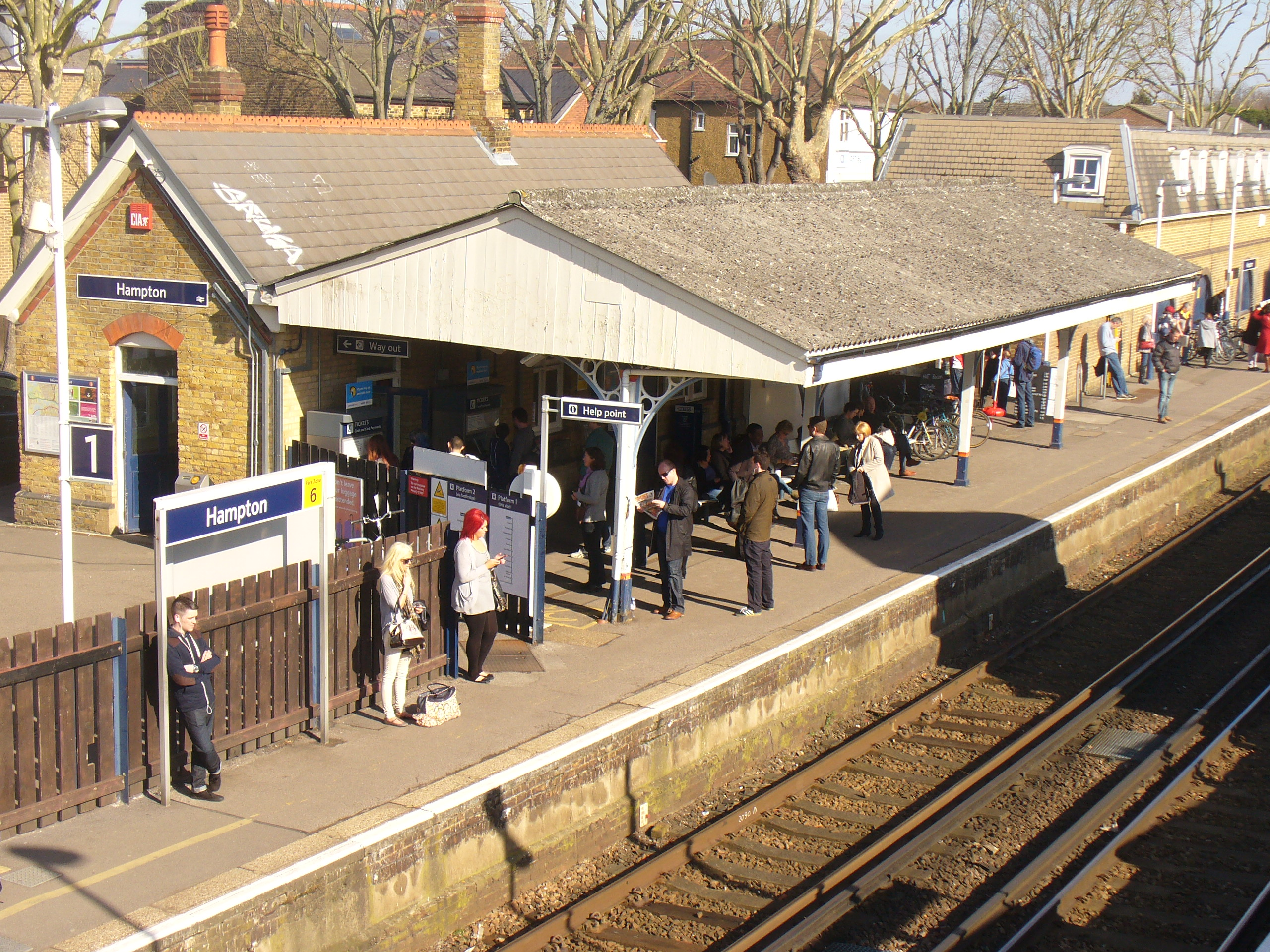
Hampton Station

Hampton railway station is towards the south-west and by the main parades of shops on either side of the line; just north of Hampton Hill is Fulwell railway station; both are on the Shepperton Branch Line. Just south of Hampton Court neighbourhood, clustered about the Tudor, Stuart and Georgian Palace and Gardens is Hampton Court railway station on the Hampton Court branch line. Hampton Wick railway station is on the Kingston loop line. The London terminus for both lines is London Waterloo.

== Climate ==
Climate data for Hampton Water Works – Climate Station (1991–2020)
Month	Jan	Feb	Mar	Apr	May	Jun	Jul	Aug	Sep	Oct	Nov	Dec	Year
Record high °C (°F)	15.4 (59.7)	20.0 (68.0)	22.2 (72.0)	28.4 (83.1)	29.5 (85.1)	34.5 (94.1)	35.0 (95.0)	36.6 (97.9)	31.9 (89.4)	28.5 (83.3)	18.6 (65.5)	16.4 (61.5)	36.6 (97.9)
Mean daily maximum °C (°F)	8.5 (47.3)	8.9 (48.0)	11.5 (52.7)	14.7 (58.5)	18.0 (64.4)	21.0 (69.8)	23.2 (73.8)	22.8 (73.0)	19.8 (67.6)	15.7 (60.3)	11.6 (52.9)	8.9 (48.0)	15.4 (59.7)
Daily mean °C (°F)	5.7 (42.3)	5.8 (42.4)	7.8 (46.0)	10.4 (50.7)	13.5 (56.3)	16.5 (61.7)	18.7 (65.7)	18.4 (65.1)	15.7 (60.3)	12.3 (54.1)	8.6 (47.5)	6.1 (43.0)	11.6 (52.9)
Mean daily minimum °C (°F)	2.9 (37.2)	2.8 (37.0)	4.1 (39.4)	6.0 (42.8)	9.0 (48.2)	12.0 (53.6)	14.1 (57.4)	14.0 (57.2)	11.5 (52.7)	8.9 (48.0)	5.6 (42.1)	3.3 (37.9)	7.9 (46.2)
Record low °C (°F)	−12.2 (10.0)	−7.6 (18.3)	−9.0 (15.8)	−2.9 (26.8)	−1.1 (30.0)	2.8 (37.0)	6.1 (43.0)	6.7 (44.1)	1.5 (34.7)	−2.9 (26.8)	−6.1 (21.0)	−8.0 (17.6)	−12.2 (10.0)
Average precipitation mm (inches)	57.5 (2.26)	44.1 (1.74)	37.5 (1.48)	40.6 (1.60)	42.1 (1.66)	48.9 (1.93)	43.3 (1.70)	55.5 (2.19)	49.9 (1.96)	65.8 (2.59)	66.0 (2.60)	57.2 (2.25)	608.5 (23.96)
Average precipitation days (≥ 1.0 mm)	11.3	9.6	8.4	8.4	7.8	8.3	7.3	8.5	8.0	10.4	11.0	10.6	109.5
Mean monthly sunshine hours	56.8	78.1	120.4	168.0	202.9	203.2	212.8	196.4	153.5	111.8	64.2	50.8	1,618.9
Source 1: Met Office
Source 2: Starlings Roost Weather

== Nearest places ==
- Twickenham
- Sunbury
- Fulwell
- Hanworth
- Teddington
- Whitton
- West Molesey
- East Molesey
- Esher
- Hampton Wick
- Kingston

== Notes and references ==
=== Sources ===
Barnfield, Paul (2001). When the Bombs Fell: Twickenham, Teddington and the Hamptons under Aerial Bombardment during the Second World War. Paper 80. London: Borough of Twickenham Local History Society. ISBN 0903341735.

Batey, Mavis; Buttery, Henrietta; Lambert, David; Wilkie, Kim (1994). Arcadian Thames: The River Landscape from Hampton to Kew. London: Barn Elms. ISBN 1899531009.

Calabria, Verusca; Carney, Sarah (2014), Hampton Nurserylands Factsheet (PDF), Jam Yesterday, Jam Tomorrow – History of Market Gardens in Middlesex

Cockburn, J S; King, H P F; McDonnell, K G T, eds. (1969). A History of the County of Middlesex: Volume 1, Physique, Archaeology, Domesday, Ecclesiastical Organization, the Jews, Religious Houses, Education of Working Classes To 1870, Private Education From Sixteenth Century. London – via British History Online.

Fowler, G. Herbert (1914). "De St Valery". Genealogist. XXX: 1–17 – via Internet Archive.

Garside, Bernard (1951). The Manor Lordship and Great Parks of Hampton Court during the Sixteenth and Seventeenth Centuries (with a description of Hampton Wick Fields and the Thames Islands). Richmond: Dimblebys of Richmond.

Gover, J. E. B.; Mawer, Allen; Stenton, F. M. (1942). The Place-Names of Middlesex apart from the City of London. English Place-Name Society. Vol. XVIII. London: Cambridge University Press.

Hawkins, Duncan (Autumn 1998). "Anglo-Saxon Kingston: A Shifting Pattern of Settlement" (PDF). London Archaeologist. VIII (10): 271–278.

Heath, Gerald (1981). A Chronicle of Hampton 1956–1981. London: Hampton Residents' Association.

Heath, Gerald (2000). White, Kathy; Heath, Joan (eds.). Hampton Court: the story of a village. Hampton Court Association. ISBN 978-0953870004.

Historic England (2022). London Borough of Richmond – Archaeological Priority Areas Appraisal. London: Historic England.

Hodges, N. J .M.; Latham, E (1991). Hampton Village Study (Conservation Area no. 12) Hampton Court Green Study (Conservation Area no. 11) (PDF). London: London Borough of Richmond upon Thames.

Hugo, Thomas (1861). The History of Mynchin Buckland Priory and Preceptory, in the County of Somerset. London: J.R. Smith.

Kelsall, A. F. (1972). St. Albans, Hampton. Paper 25. London: Borough of Twickenham Local History Society.

Larking, Rev Lambert (1857). The Knights hospitallers in England: being the report of prior Philip de Thame to the grand master Elyan de Villanova for A. D. 1338. Ed. by the Rev. Lambert b. Larking, M. A., with an historical introduction by John Mitchell Kemble, M. A. (PDF). Camden Society.

London Borough of Richmond upon Thames (2022), Hampton Village: Draft Conservation Appraisal Conversation Area No 12

Museum of London Archaeology Service (2000). The archaeology of Greater London: An assessment of archaeological evidence for human presence in the area now covered by Greater London (PDF). London: Museum of London Archaeology Service. ISBN 1-901992-15-2.

Orton, Margery, ed. (1965). The Birth and Growth of Hampton Hill. Kingston upon Thames: The Parochial Church Council of St. James's Church.

Page, William, ed. (1911). A History of the County of Middlesex: Volume 2, General; Ashford, East Bedfont With Hatton, Feltham, Hampton With Hampton Wick, Hanworth, Laleham, Littleton. London – via British History Online.

Phillips, Geoffrey (1981). Thames Crossings: Bridges, Tunnels and Ferries. London: David & Charles Inc. ISBN 0715382020.

Reynolds, Susan, ed. (1962). A History of the County of Middlesex: Volume 3, Shepperton, Staines, Stanwell, Sunbury, Teddington, Heston and Isleworth, Twickenham, Cowley, Cranford, West Drayton, Greenford, Hanwell, Harefield and Harlington. London – via British History Online.

Rice, Ken (2009). Hampton Grammar School in wartime 1939–1945. Hampton: Hampton School. ISBN 9780952211310.

Ripley, Henry (1883). The History and Topography of Hampton-on-Thames. London: Wyman & Sons.

Russell, Gareth (2023). The Palace: From the Tudors to the Windsors – 500 Years of History at Hampton Court. London: William Collins. ISBN 9780008436988.

Sargent, Andrew (2015). The Story of the Thames. Stroud: Amberley Publishing. ISBN 9781445646626.

Sheaf, John; Howe, Ken (1995). Hampton and Teddington Past. London: Historical Publications. ISBN 0948667257.

Sheaf, John (1997). Edwardian Hampton: The story of Hampton and Hampton Hill from 1900–1914. Paper 76. London: Borough of Twickenham Local History Society.

Sheaf, John (2005). Hampton 1915–1937: The story of Hampton from the First World War to the amalgamation with the Borough of Twickhenham. Paper 86. London: Borough of Twickenham Local History Society.

Sheaf, John (2014). The Changing Face of Station Road, Hampton – Developments in the Area since the 1860s and a Short History of Every Building in Station Road. Paper 93. London: Borough of Twickenham Local History Society. ISBN 9780903341929.

Sheaf, John (2015). Hampton 100 Years Ago. Paper 95. London: Borough of Twickenham Local History Society.

Sheaf, John (2017). Images of Hampton in the 1920s and 1930s – the Roads and Buildings, Businesses and Shops, the River and Recreation. Paper 100. London: Borough of Twickenham Local History Society. ISBN 9780903341998.

Sheaf, John (2019). Pictures of Hampton in the 1940s, 1950s & 1960s: The Roads and Buildings, Businesses and Shops, the River and Recreation. Paper 104. London: Borough of Twickenham Local History Society. ISBN 9781911145042.

Sheaf, John (2021). Images of Hampton in the 1970s & 1980s: The Roads and Buildings, Businesses and Shops, The River and Recreation. Paper 106. London: Borough of Twickenham Local History Society. ISBN 9781911145066.

Stevenson, Bruce (1972). Middlesex. London: B.T. Batsford Ltd. ISBN 0713400706.

Sullivan, David (1994). The Westminster Corridor: The Anglo-Saxon story of Westminster Abbey and its lands in Middlesex. London: Historical Publications. ISBN 0948667249.

Thurley, Simon (2003). Hampton Court: A Social and Architectural History. London: Yale University Press. ISBN 0300102232.

Urwin, A. C. B. (1982). Commercial Nurseries and Market Gardens. Paper 50. London: Borough of Twickenham Local History Society.

White, Kathy; Foster, Peter (1997). Bushy Park: Royals, Rangers and Rogues. East Molesey: Foundry Press. ISBN 0953024504.
