= Molesey Lock =

Lock on the River Thames in Surrey, England

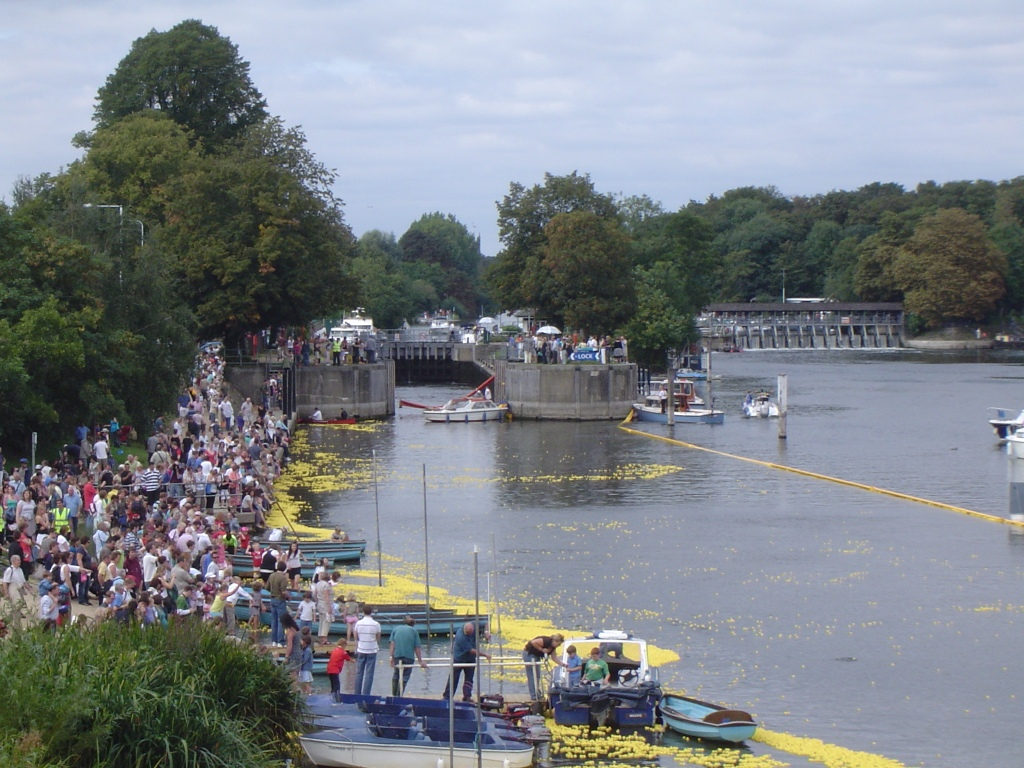
- The lock after the release of 160,000 Rubber ducks at the start of the Great British Duck Race in September 2007
- Interactive map of Molesey Lock
- 51°24′17″N 0°20′45″W
- Waterway: River Thames
- County: Surrey
- Maintained by: Environment Agency
- Operation: Hydraulic
- First built: 1815
- Latest built: 1906
- Length: 81.78 m (268 ft 4 in)
- Width: 7.56 m (24 ft 10 in)
- Fall: 1.85 m (6 ft 1 in)
- Above sea level: 20 ft (6.1 m)
- Distance to Teddington Lock: 4.8 miles
- Power is available out of hours

Molesey Lock is a lock on the River Thames in England at East Molesey, Surrey on the right bank.

The lock was built by the City of London Corporation in 1815 and was rebuilt by the Thames Conservancy in 1906. It is the second longest on the river at 81.78 m (268 ft 4 in); it is the second lowest of the non-tidal river and third-lowest including Richmond Lock on the Tideway. Upstream of the lock are moorings for small boats, specifically skiff, paddleboard, small speedboat and open kayak hire, a tour boat pier, a kiosk and van parking space for ice cream and soft drinks. A few metres upstream is a combined side weir and front weir followed by an attached ait, Ash Island. A low backwater against the opposite bank which forms the waterside to homes sometimes called the Hampton Riviera continues to a small upper weir.

Molesey Lock is within sight of the walls of Hampton Court Palace in southwest London on the opposite bank through the arches of Hampton Court Bridge, designed by Edwin Lutyens (220 m away).

== Boat hire and touring ==
The lock's proximity to Hampton Court and boat hire at the site made it a popular venue for spectators in the Victorian and Edwardian eras, the tree-lined lock attracts large numbers of visitors for nine months of the year. Hire boat companies and ice cream sales attract visitors in all months apart from winter.

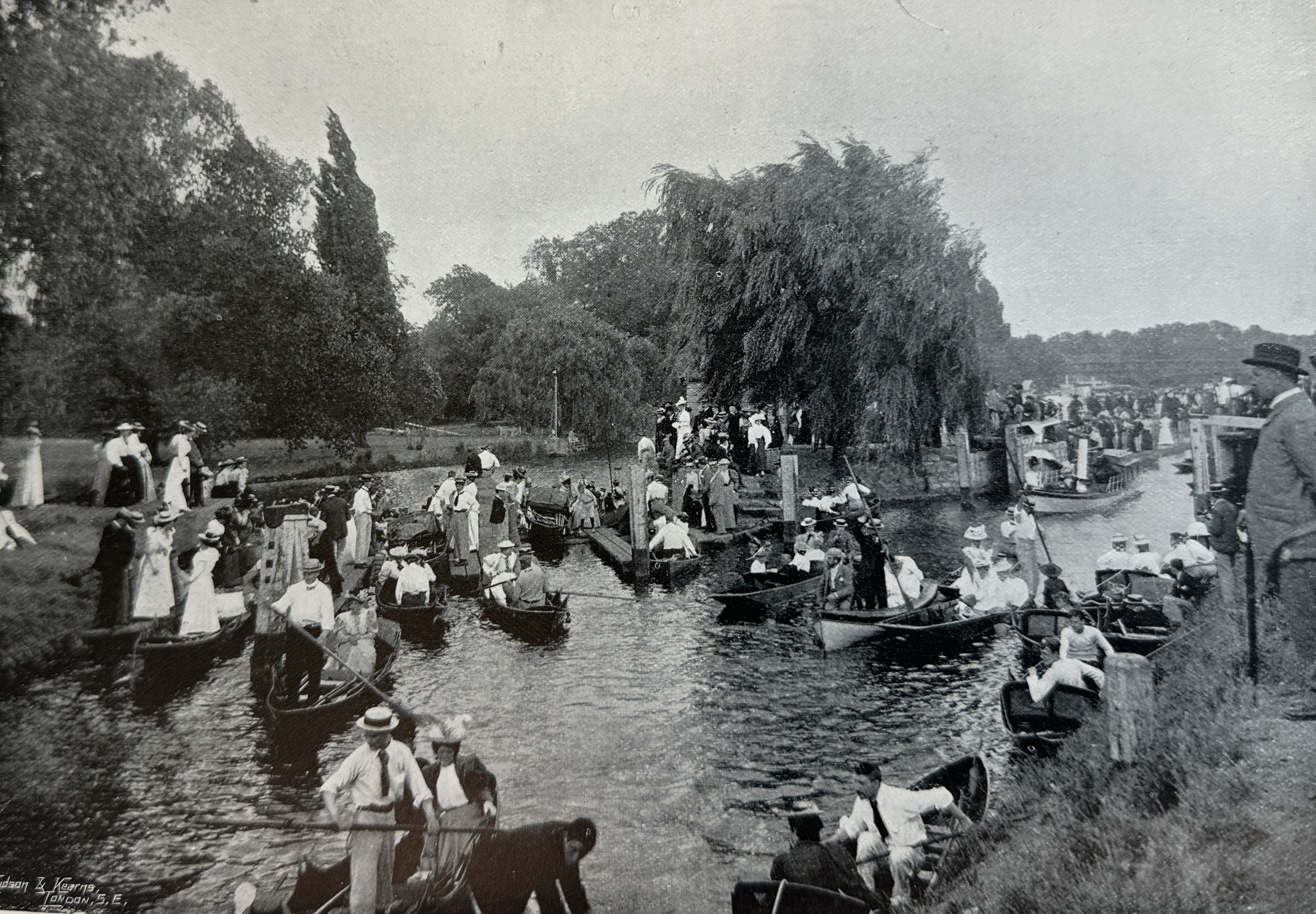
Molesey Lock c1897

== History ==
A lock was first proposed in 1802 because of then-shallows upstream at "Kenton Hedge and Sundbury Flatts above" — nothing came of the suggestion. In 1809 the proposal was resubmitted Parliament passed the Act for construction of the lock in 1812. Building began in 1814 and it opened in 1815 with an Italianate lockhouse. The first lock keeper was killed in a horse race at Moulsey Hurst and his successor discharged after incidents of stealing from barges. In 1853 changes were made to the lock in anticipation of lower water levels caused by the extraction of water upstream. Fish ladders were added to the weir in 1864 and the boat slide built in 1871. Such was the popularity of boating that in 1877 the navigation commission stationed a boat and crew in busy days above the weir in case of accidents. The lock was rebuilt in 1906. On the small lock island is a plaque commemorating Michael J Bulleid whose work for salmon conservancy allows them to scale the river.

== Access to the lock ==
The lock is 220 metres (720 ft) upstream of Hampton Court Bridge on the right bank, which is here the south side. It is immediately accessible from Hurst Road/Riverbank (A3050) with pavements and a sloped approach and is 330 metres (1,080 ft) from the platform at Hampton Court railway station terminus on the same bank.

== Reach above the lock ==
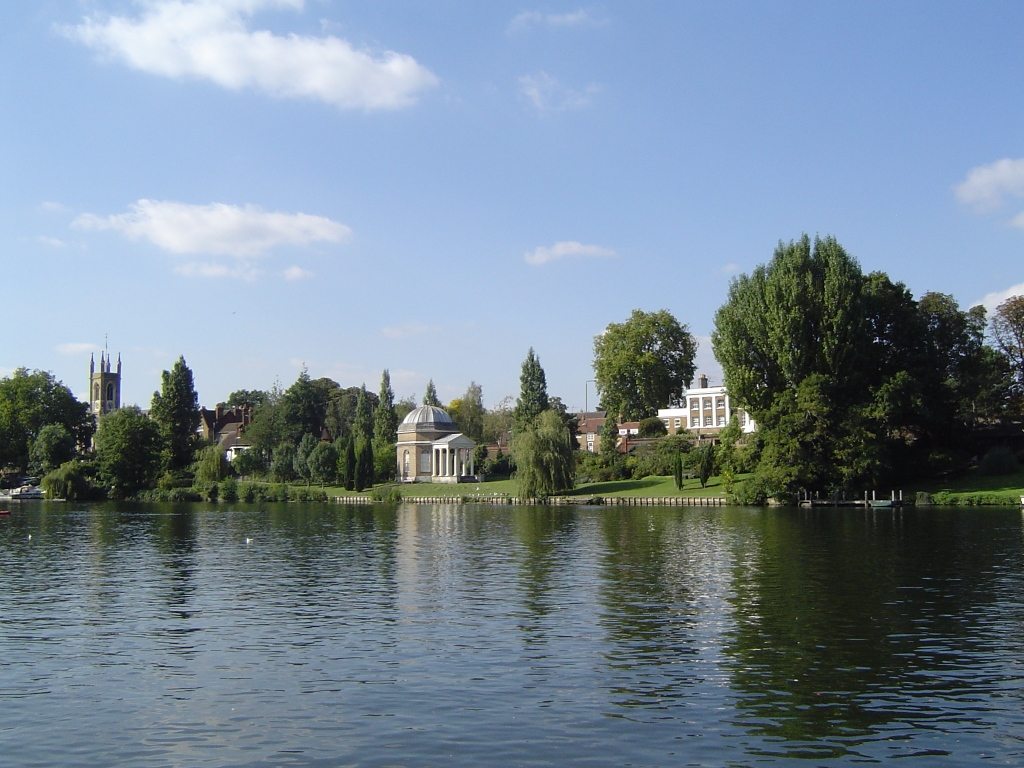
The Thames at Hampton

After the lock cut is Tagg's Island which provides mooring for houseboats some of which are three storeys high. On the Surrey bank here is the "Eights Tree" a tall metal sculpture outside Molesey Boat Club. The left bank here is sometimes marked as the Hampton Riviera featuring the Swiss Cottage, the Astoria Houseboat and an array of period buildings at Hampton such as Rotary Court. Garrick's Ait similar in size to Ash Island, is residential, by the Hampton-Molesey Hurst Ferry, which runs in the summer between Hampton and Moulsey Hurst park on the right bank.

Left bank proceeding in reverse to flow

Benn's Island, the second-smallest named island in the Thames, lies upstream of the lock, opposite the original village conservation area of Hampton facing St Mary's Church and The Bell Inn, and is entirely covered by Hampton Sailing Club. Further upstream is Platts Eyot, where Motor Torpedo Boats were built during World War I and World War II. At Platt's Eyot on the left bank is Hampton Water Treatment Works and reservoirs, alongside Millennium Boat House jointly operated by Hampton School Boat Club and Lady Eleanor Holles School Boat Club. Grand Junction Isle has a footbridge and a few chalets on it followed by riverside houses at Sunbury and Sunbury Court Island. Upstream of these is Rivermead Island an expanse of public open space. The area of Sunbury Weir pool is used for kayaking and the narrow Creek backwater runs on the left bank adjoining Wheatley's Ait which has two sources: the River Ash and a minor tumbling bay-weir fed branch of the Thames which naturally formed the large residential island.

Right bank proceeding in reverse to flow

On the right bank is the large stretch of open ground at Moulsey Hurst, which has a heritage marker and an information panel opposite Platt's Eyot. Beyond the Eyot on this bank are the Molesey Reservoirs behind the towpath to Walton-on-Thames, trees, high brick walls and a patch of meadow before Sunbury Lock.

Sports and public regattas

The stretch is home to two sailing and three rowing clubs, one of which is skiffing and one for two large independent schools. Molesey Regatta takes place from Platts Eyot in July and Sunbury Amateur Regatta is held alongside Rivermead Island in August.

=== Sports clubs on the reach ===
- Molesey Boat Club
- Hampton School Boat Club (shares Millennium Boathouse with LEH School)
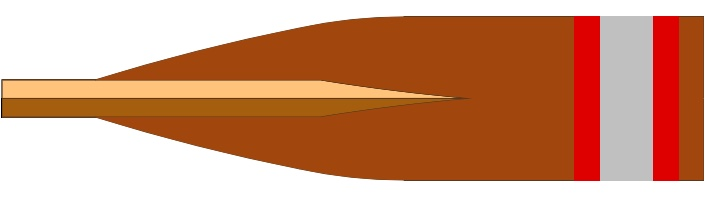
- Sunbury Skiff and Punting Club
- Lady Eleanor Holles School Boat Club (shares Millennium Boathouse with Hampton School)
- Hampton Sailing Club
- Aquarius Sailing Club
- Hampton Canoe Club
- 1st Molesey (Jaguar) Sea Scout Group
- 1st Hampton Hill (Achilles) Sea Scout Group

=== Waterworks and reservoirs ===
There are reservoirs on both sides of the river above Sunbury Lock, created after the 1852 Metropolis Water Act made it illegal to take drinking water for London from the tidal Thames below Teddington Lock because of the amount of sewage in the river. The Hampton Waterworks were built on the northern bank in the 1850s by three companies — the Grand Junction Waterworks Company, the Southwark and Vauxhall Waterworks Company, and the West Middlesex Waterworks Company. The reservoirs at Molesey on the southern bank were established in 1872, by the Lambeth Waterworks Company, followed three years later by the Chelsea Waterworks Company. Both companies had previously built their reservoirs at Seething Wells below Molesey Lock, but the turbulence caused by the River Mole, River Ember and The Rythe meant there was too much mud brought in with the water.

=== Thames Path ===
The Thames Path stays on the Surrey bank (right bank) to Sunbury Lock. The next bridge is half-way along the long reach upstream, Walton Bridge. A large tank trap from World War II is visible beside the right-bank reservoirs.

== Literature and the media ==
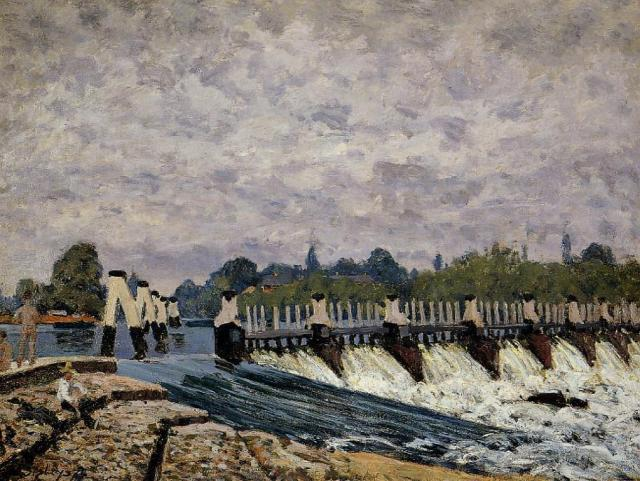
Alfred Sisley's painting of the weir in 1874

- Jerome K. Jerome wrote in the 1880s "I have stood and watched it sometimes, when you could not see any water at all, but only a brilliant tangle of bright blazers, and gay caps, and saucy hats, and many-coloured parasols, and silken rugs, and cloaks, and streaming ribbons..."
- The lock featured in an episode of the gardening make-over programme Ground Force, broadcast in December 2024.

== See also ==
- Locks on the River Thames
- Rowing on the River Thames
- Sailing on the River Thames
- London water supply infrastructure

Next lock upstream	River Thames	Next lock downstream
Sunbury Lock; 4.79 km (2.98 mi)	Molesey Lock; Grid reference: TQ150686	Teddington Lock; 7.74 km (4.81 mi)
