= Tagg's Island =

Island in the River Thames in London, England

Coordinates: 51°24′32″N 0°21′8″W

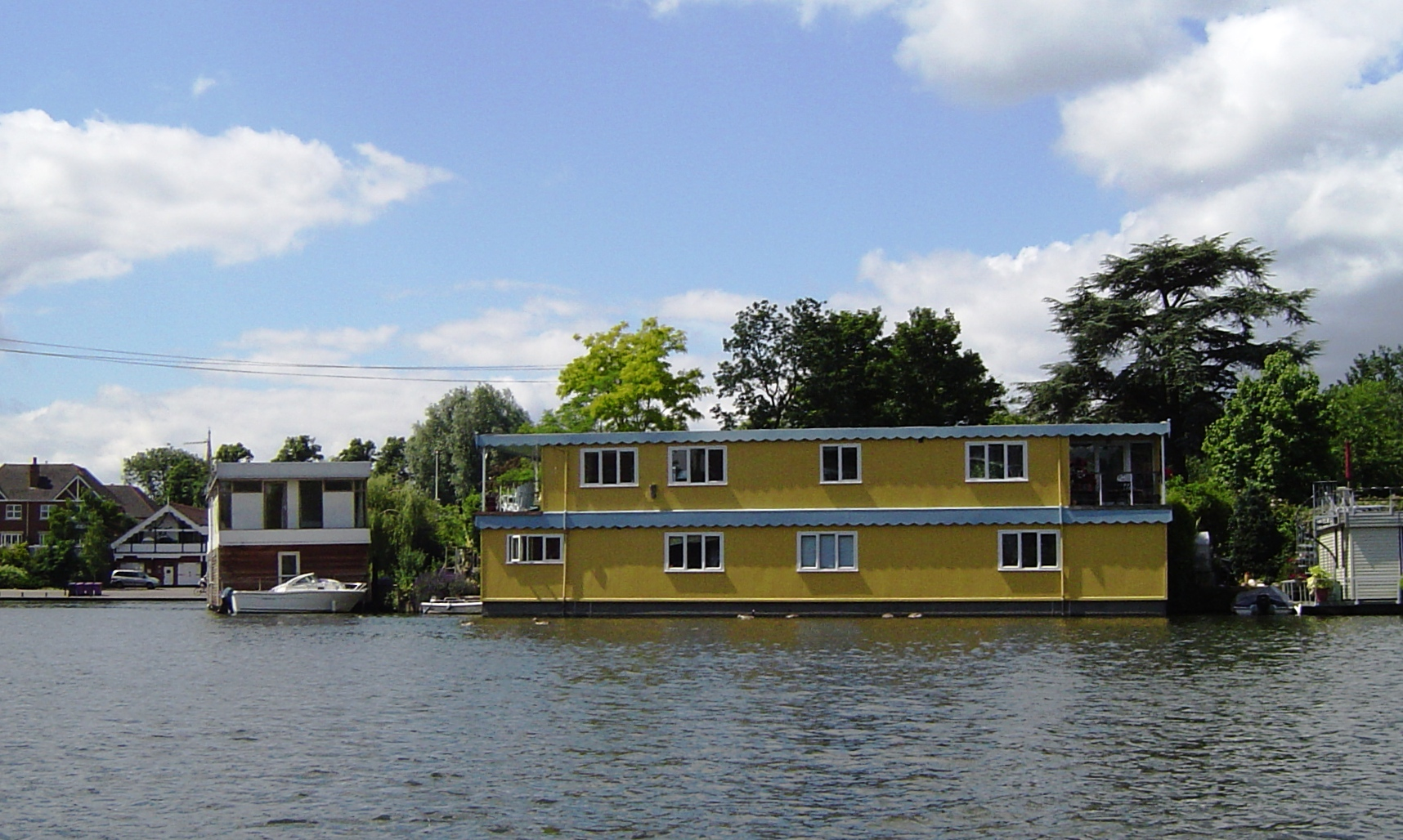
Lower end of Tagg's Island with Molesey Boat Club beyond

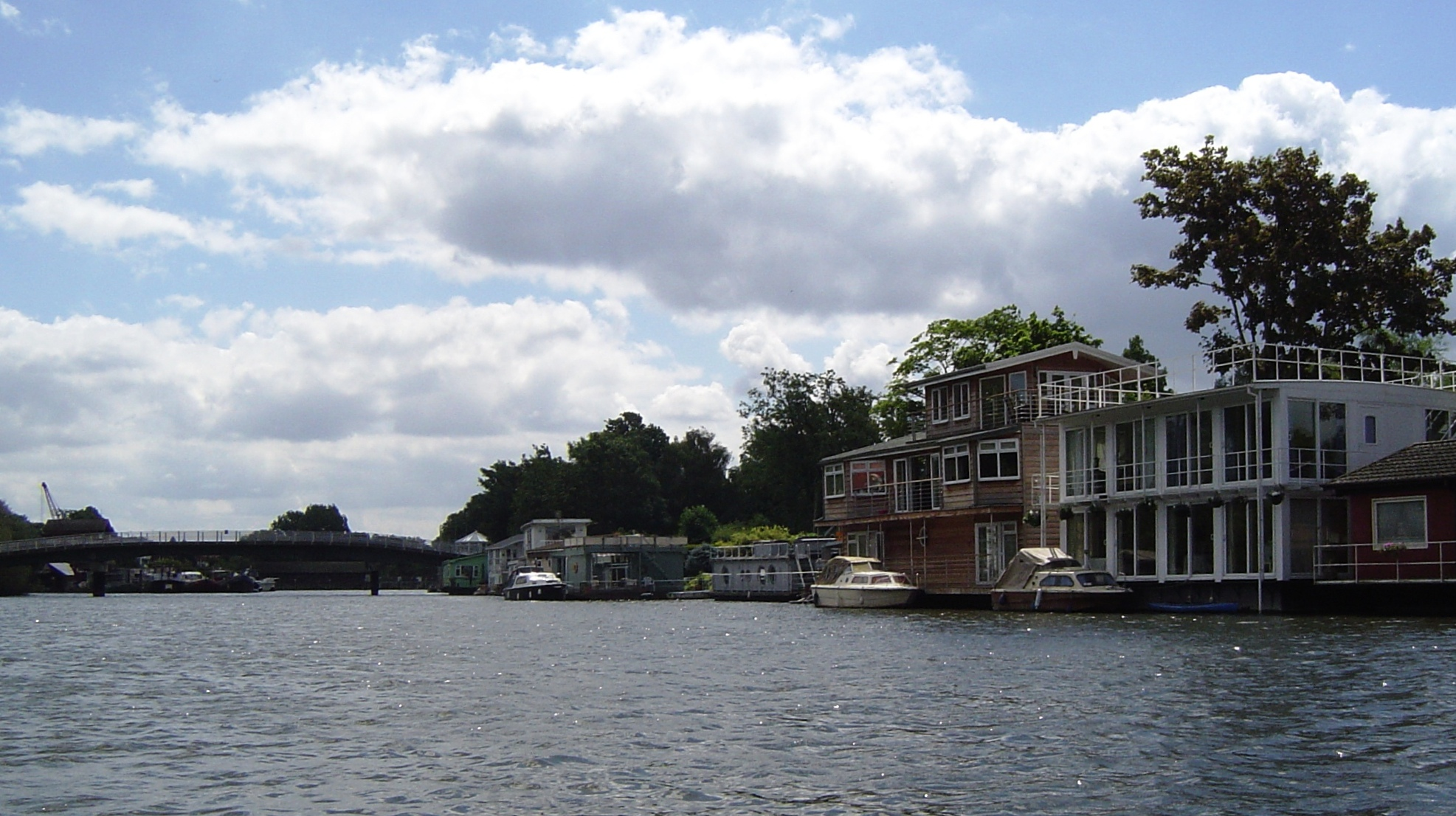
Tagg's Island from upstream with large houseboats and the road bridge to the island

Tagg's Island is an ait (island) on the River Thames on the reach above Molesey Lock and just above Ash Island, located in the London Borough of Richmond upon Thames and part of Hampton. The island is roughly 400 metres long by 90 metres wide at its widest point, covering 6 acres (including its central lagoon). Although close to the Surrey bank near East Molesey, the island is connected to the further Middlesex bank by a single track road bridge, being the only island on the non-tidal Thames accessible by car.

Houses are not permitted to be built on the island and it is surrounded by houseboats whose owners, in acquiring their mooring land, have the right to belong to the island's residents' association, which owns the island. Some of the Thames' most expensive houseboats are on this stretch of the river and are up to three storeys. The centre of the island has a lagoon with river access and private moorings surrounded by trees and crossed by a small footbridge.

Historically the island had been the site of multiple hotel and resort developments, including the Island Hotel established in 1872 by Thomas Tagg (after whom the island is named), and the famous Karsino hotel built by impresario Fred Karno in 1913 which, following Karno's 1926-27 bankruptcy, became known as the Thames Riviera under various further owners. The island was bought by car manufacturer AC Cars in 1940, which converted the skating rink and tennis courts into factory space for wartime munitions and then switched to producing Invacars there for the Ministry of Pensions from 1948 until the mid-1960s.

== History ==
Originally Crown land and part of the Manor of Hampton granted to Walter of Saint-Valéry following the Norman Conquest, the island was historically known as Walnut Tree Ait. The island was purchased around 1850 by Francis Jackson Kent, a Hampton solicitor and property speculator (who bought and developed most of the land in East Molesey following the opening of the Hampton Court branch line), during which period the island came to be known as Kent's Ait. Kent evicted the inhabitants, who had subsisted by growing osiers used for basket making, and leased one part of the island to Joseph Harvey, who established a pub called 'The Angler's Retreat', and another part to Thomas George Tagg, who came from a local family of boat builders.

Ordnance Survey map (1897) showing Kent's Ait and the Island Hotel

=== Thomas Tagg and the Island Hotel ===
Tagg eventually took out a lease of the whole island, and in September 1872 took over the licence for the pub. After negotiations with Kent, Tagg swiftly rebuilt the pub into The Island Hotel with "an entrance hall, bars, coffee room, smoking room, and bedrooms for guests, each with a verandah with views out over the river", and which "... during the season ... [presented] a very gay and lively appearance ... much resorted to by literary and theatrical celebrities". The hotel became a favoured venue of London high society, frequented by the likes of: Edward, Prince of Wales (the future King Edward VII); the Duke and Duchess of Fife; and the actresses Emily Soldene and Sarah Bernhardt.

In the 1880s the island became an anchorage for (predominantly seasonal) (Note: The 1901 Census recorded 4 inhabited houseboats and 16 'Uninhabited' houseboats (which were later crossed out).) houseboats, which by this time were "exuberant floating juggernauts" with multiple storeys and comprehensive amenities, and had famous residents including writer J.M. Barrie, Gilbert & Sullivan exponent Henry Lytton, and a music hall actor known as Fred Karno.

With the advent of the house-boat an era of greater luxuriousness was inaugurated. At first the house-boat was a floating structure of small proportions and humble pretensions—the home of some artist or some devoted lover of the Thames who had become tired of camping out. But the possibilities of the thing were soon gauged by those to whom money was not very much of an object. The first of the house-boats on a really large and luxurious scale was built for Mr. O'Hagan of Hampton by Tom Tagg. — William Mackay, Bohemian Days in Fleet Street, 1913

Tagg died in 1897, and his son George Tagg took over control of the hotel and the island. Unfortunately the economic effects of the Boer War, the advent of the motor car, changing tastes, and a series of poor summers, led to a significant downturn in the fortunes of the hotel, and Tagg junior declared bankruptcy in 1904. The assets of the family business, including the lease of the hotel, were put up for auction (with limited success). The hotel began to fall into disrepair, and residents of the island's houseboats impressed upon Francis Jackson Kent (who retained the freehold) to find a suitable buyer.

=== Fred Karno, the Astoria, and the Karsino ===
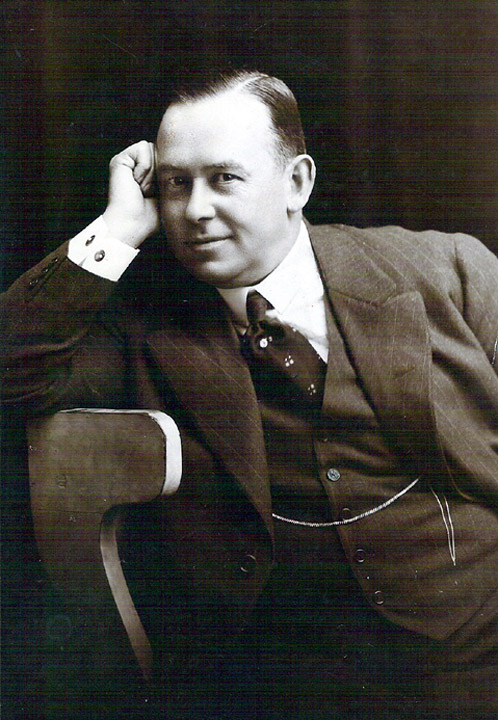
Fred Karno

In the meantime, Fred Karno, who had resided in his houseboat Highland Lassie since 1903, decided to upgrade his accommodations. Taking competitive inspiration from the then-grandest houseboat on Thames – Henry Hewitt's Satsuma, anchored upstream at nearby Platt's Eyot – Karno commissioned the construction of the palatial Astoria, with a sundeck 90 feet long by 18 wide, which could accommodate a full orchestra and dancefloor. Completed in 1913, the Astoria cost an estimated £20,000.

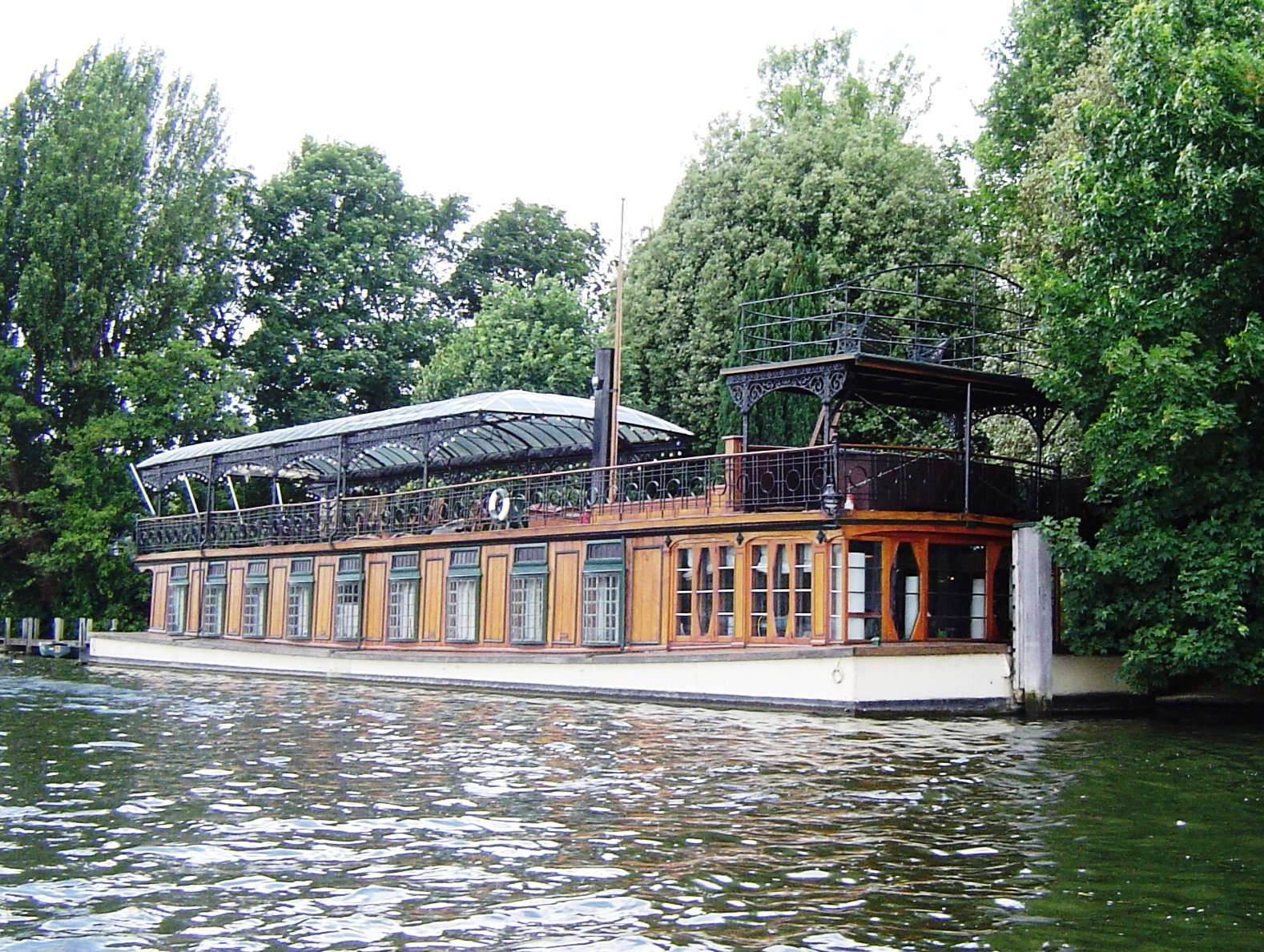
The Astoria

Karno, who as an impresario had reputedly discovered Charlie Chaplin, was approached by the other houseboat owners to reverse the hotel's fortunes, fearing that if the hotel failed, the island would be sold for building development and their mooring leases would not be renewed. After negotiations with Kent, Karno took on a 42-year lease over the island in Christmas 1912.

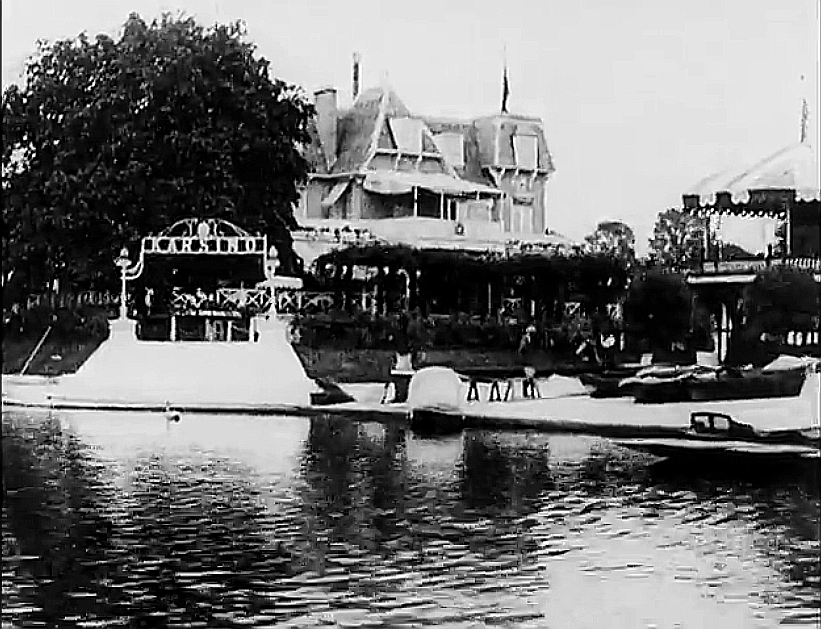
The Karsino hotel - still from Along Father Thames to Shepperton (1924)

Karno had the existing hotel building demolished, and employed the noted theatre architect Frank Matcham to design 'the finest and most luxurious river hotel in Europe', commissioning builders Allen & Co of Westminster and the West End decoration and furnishing specialists Messrs. Ropley to outfit the interior. The result was The Karsino, an opulent 26-bedroom hotel with a double verandah on three sides, a ballroom with a resident orchestra seating 350, billiard room, lifts to all floors and electric lighting throughout. Ferries were laid on for guests to get to the hotel and small boats provided for amusement. The gardens were landscaped, and tennis, croquet, bowls and badminton courts installed. The Karsino's opening on Sunday 22 June 1913 was mobbed by thousands of prospective attendees, most of whom remained on the riverside, with those in attendance facing an overwhelmed catering department. With performers press-ganged into the kitchens and dining room, disaster was averted and the opening deemed a success.

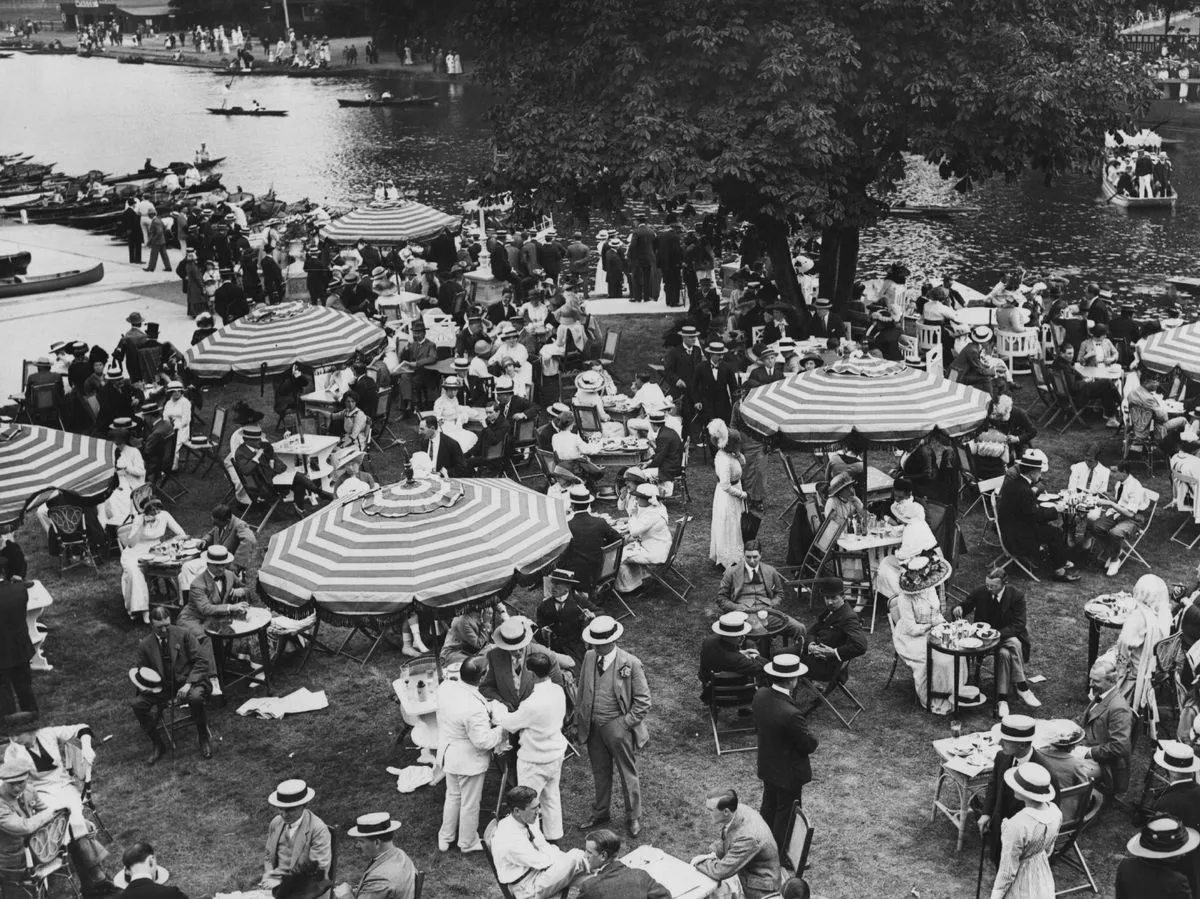
Karsino Hotel June 1913

In 1914 Karno expanded the hotel by constructing The Palm Court concert pavilion, which accommodated 800 people under a ceiling painted with scenes of the river between Hampton Court and Windsor. The stage was constructed with two prosceniums – one facing into the ballroom, the other facing out to the hotel grounds – allowing an outdoor performance to swiftly switch indoors if the weather turned inclement.

The outbreak of the First World War dampened the Karsino's prospects (with Continental clientele returning home), but it continued to entertain servicemen home on leave, airmen training at Hurst Park (which had been converted into an airfield for the Royal Flying Corps), and recuperating invalids. Following the Armistice, Karno enthusiastically re-opened the hotel, expecting his upper and upper-middle class patrons to return, but changing tastes and the dominance of the motor car saw his clientele seek pleasures further afield. The demise of music hall in an era of cinema and wireless saw Karno's personal fortunes decline. Having sold the Astoria at a significant loss, Karno sold the island's tenancy rights in 1926 to New Princes Ltd (formerly Princes Restaurant and Hotel until 1924), of Piccadilly, London for £2,500. Karno declared bankruptcy in the autumn of 1927.

The Karsino Hotel is featured in the 1916 Topical Budget newsreel Eccentric Club Entertain Wounded Soldiers, and also appears briefly in the 1924 film Along Father Thames to Shepperton, part of the Wonderful London series produced by Graham Wilcox Productions. The Karsino is referenced in the original lyrics of Jack Buchanan's "Battling Butler" (renamed Battling Buttler for its transfer to the US), where the song "Dancing Honeymoon" references the "old Karsino / We know on the Isle of Tagg".

=== Palm Beach, The Thames Riveria and the Casino Hotel ===
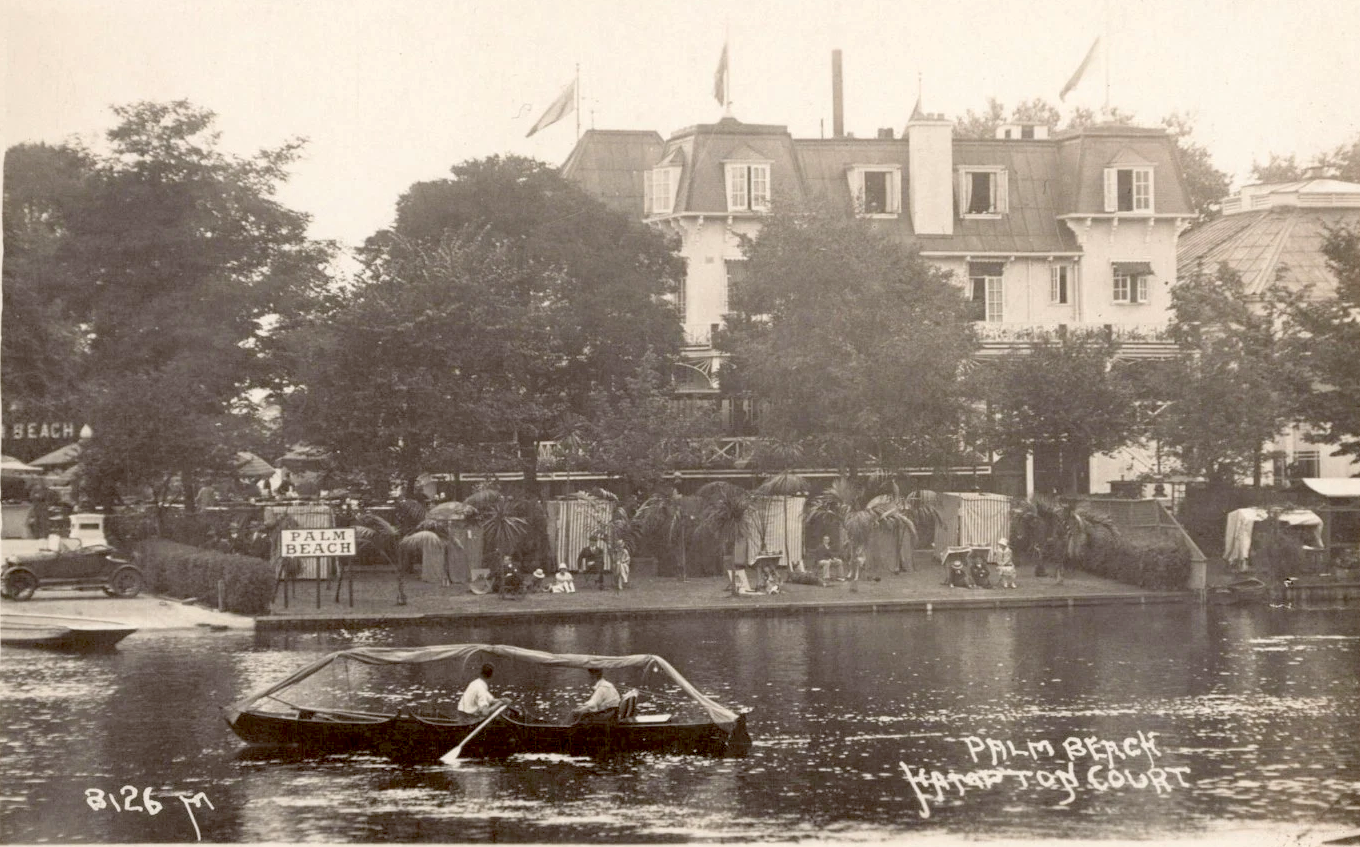
Palm Beach 1926

New Princes Ltd set about converting the island into a miniature Palm Beach, the managing director explaining their plan as: "a resemblance of America's most exclusive resort in Florida, thousands of tons of sand are to be placed on the island and hundreds of palms will be planted. There will be large sunshades, beach chairs, provision for the enjoyment of mixed bathing, and other items of amusement and relaxation generally associated with the fashionable resorts." The resort opened on 8 May 1926 with performances by touring baritone Whispering Jack Smith and the New Princes resident cabaret company (which included cabaret star Jean Rai).

The Palm Beach venture failed however, and in 1928 the lease was taken up by a former New Princes manager, Charles Pearce-Brown, now trading as impresario Herbert Cyril. Cyril's vision for the site was a 'Thames Riveria', with a sand "beach", flood-lit tennis court, and ice-skating rink. The venture failed within six weeks and Cyril was declared bankrupt.

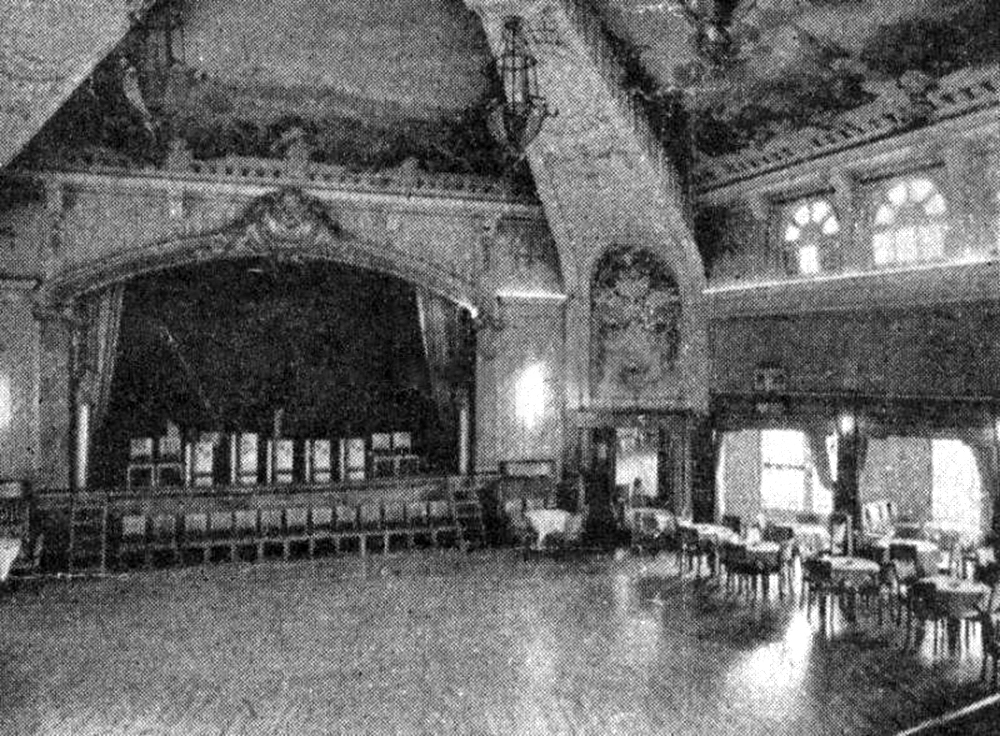
Casino Hotel ballroom c1940s

Cyril's mortgagee, the United Kingdom Advertising Company, took on the lease themselves, renovating the hotel and grounds, including a "charmingly appointed ballroom and theatre, with what is regarded as one of the finest floors in Europe, cosy alcoves for suppers and a restful balcony; .. covered tennis courts, badminton courts, putting greens, sea sand beach, pretty lawns and gardens, and facilities for bathing and boating, ... and access to the island for cars is made simple by a huge electrically-driven ferry". The Thames Riveria traded with mixed success for several years under different owners (including property magnate Charles Clore), being refurbished and re-opened as the Casino Hotel in 1935.

=== AC Cars, the Second World War and the Invacar ===
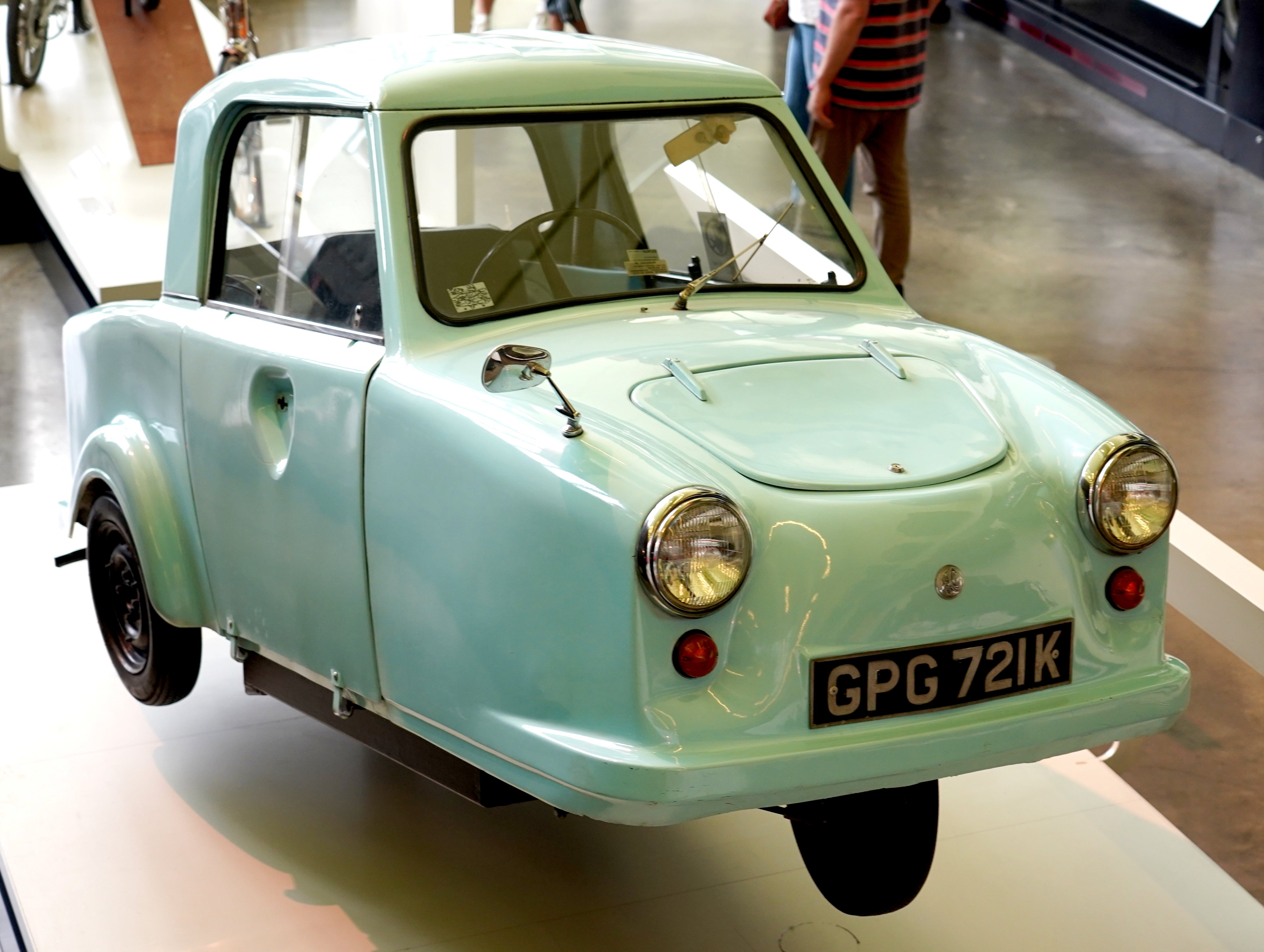
AC Cars invalid carriage

In 1941 British car manufacturer AC Cars purchased the island freehold from the Kent family, seeking space additional to its operations in Thames Ditton. The skating rink and tennis courts were converted to factory space, producing munitions, and a bridge built to connecting the island to the north bank.

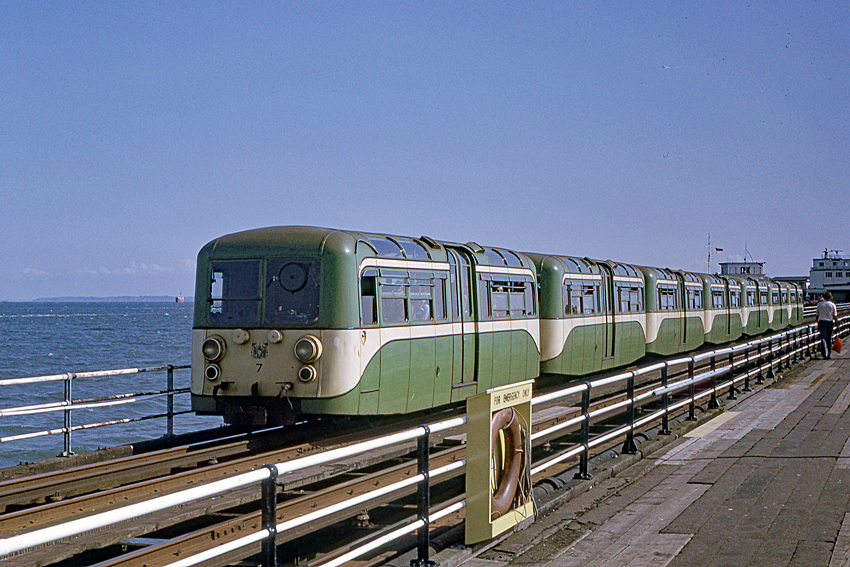
Southend Pier railcars

After the war, production shifted to producing three-wheeled vehicles for the Ministry of Pension's invalid carriage program (primarily providing vehicles to disabled servicemen). Carriages for the Pier railway at Southend were also manufactured (completed cars requiring removal of the factory wall for shipping). The company would use the Casino Hotel for product launches.

=== The Crawdaddy Club and demolition ===
Vehicle production ceased in the mid-1960s, and between 1965 and mid-1968 the Casino ballroom intermittently hosted the Crawdaddy Club, featuring bands such as Chris Farlowe & The Thunderbirds, Jimmy James and the Vagabonds, The Shotgun Express (including Rod Stewart, Mick Fleetwood and Peter Bardens) and Pink Floyd.

The Casino Hotel was ultimately abandoned. In 1970 Tommy Steele filmed part of his 1971 TV film In Search of Charlie Chaplin at the hotel, and in 1971 it was used as a set for A Clockwork Orange. The 'Billy Boy' gang fight at the start of the film was shot in the ruins of the Palm Court ballroom.

In 1965 the bridge to the north bank collapsed, and in 1971 the hotel was demolished in preparation for a new hotel proposed by American businessman Leon Bronesky (which was never built).

In the 1970s... [the island] remained desolate and overgrown, a bleak descendant of the glory it once was, with absolutely nothing to show for the millions of pounds which had been poured into it. As one stood and surveyed the ravaged scene, it was just possible that we might catch a glimpse of a group of shadowy figures, and among them recognise the features of Harvey and Kent, of Barrie, Tagg, Karno, Alexander, Cyril, Bundy, Charlie Clore and Leon Bronesky, all standing around and dropping fivers into a bottomless pit. For this surely was the most expensive piece of devastation in the whole world. It was constructed out of the debris of men's hopes and fortunes. And if we are prone to believe in legends we could even have seen circling above, the spirit of an evicted squatter, still cursing the men, the island, and all who were responsible for its being dispossessed of home and hearth many years ago. — Rowland G. M. Baker, Thameside Molesey, 1989

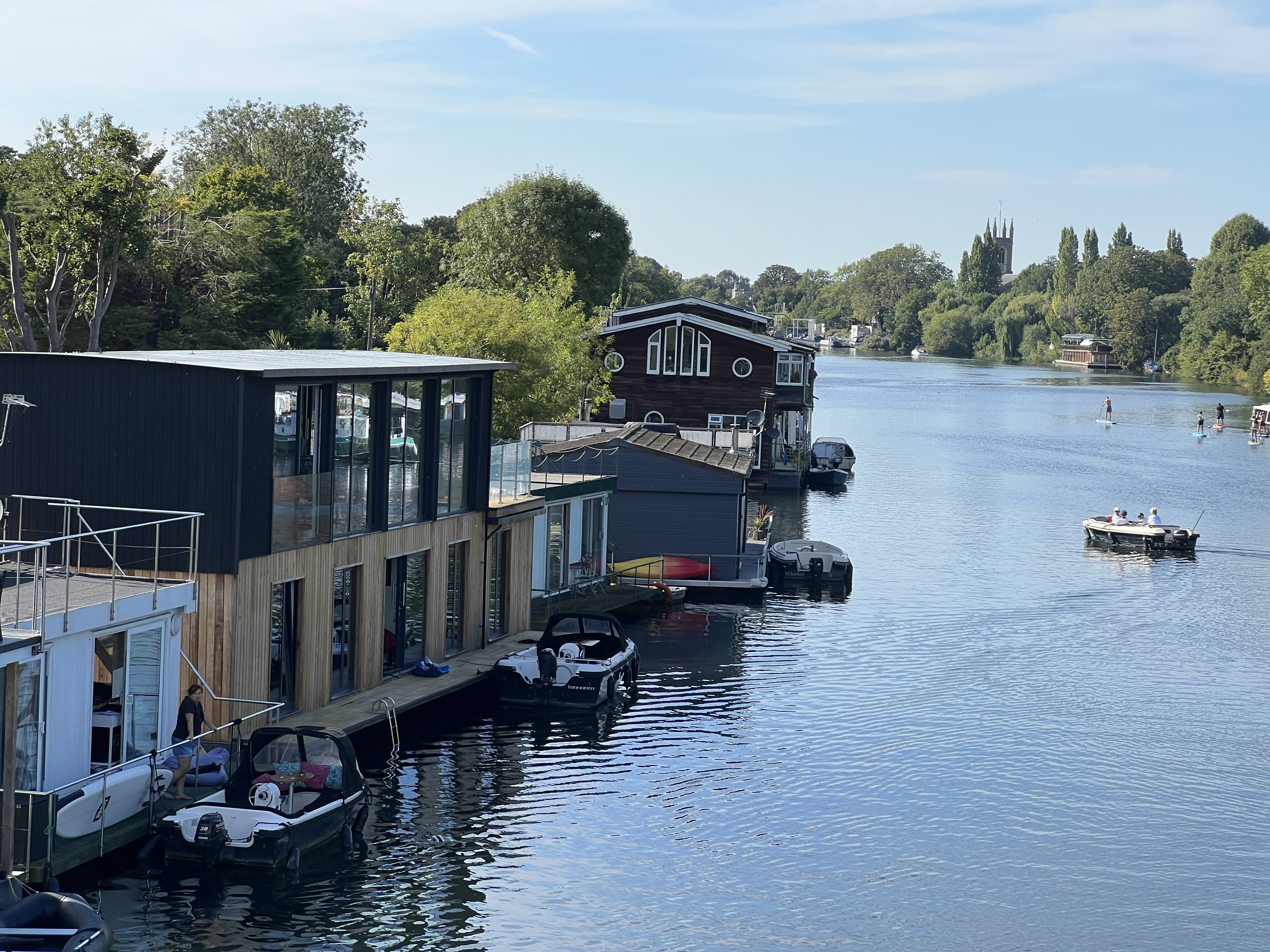
Tagg's Island houseboats, with the Astoria houseboat moored on the northern bank of the River Thames, and St Mary's Church, Hampton in the distance.

=== Houseboat mooring ===
In 1980 houseboat owners Gerry and Gillian Braban bought the island, rebuilding a road bridge to the north bank in 1982, and excavating a lagoon in the centre of the island (increasing the number of houseboats by 20) in 1983. At present the island has 62 permitted houseboats, which styles itself as a community of artists and creatives.

The Astoria was purchased by Pink Floyd guitarist David Gilmour in 1986, and used by the band as a recording studio. The houseboat is visible from the island, now moored on the northern bank upstream.

On 18 July 2022, 14-year-old Brian Sasu of Feltham jumped off Tagg's Island bridge, injured his neck and drowned.

== See also ==
- River Thames
- Islands in the River Thames
- St Alban's Riverside (including Tagg's Island sundial)
- Platt's Eyot
- Garrick's Ait
- Benn's Island
- Ash Island
- Double Bunk (film)
- A Clockwork Orange (film)

== Notes and references ==
=== References ===
Next island upstream	River Thames	Next island downstream
Garrick's Ait	Tagg's Island	Ash Island
