= Garrick's Ait =

Island in the River Thames, England

Coordinates: 51°24′42″N 0°21′37″W

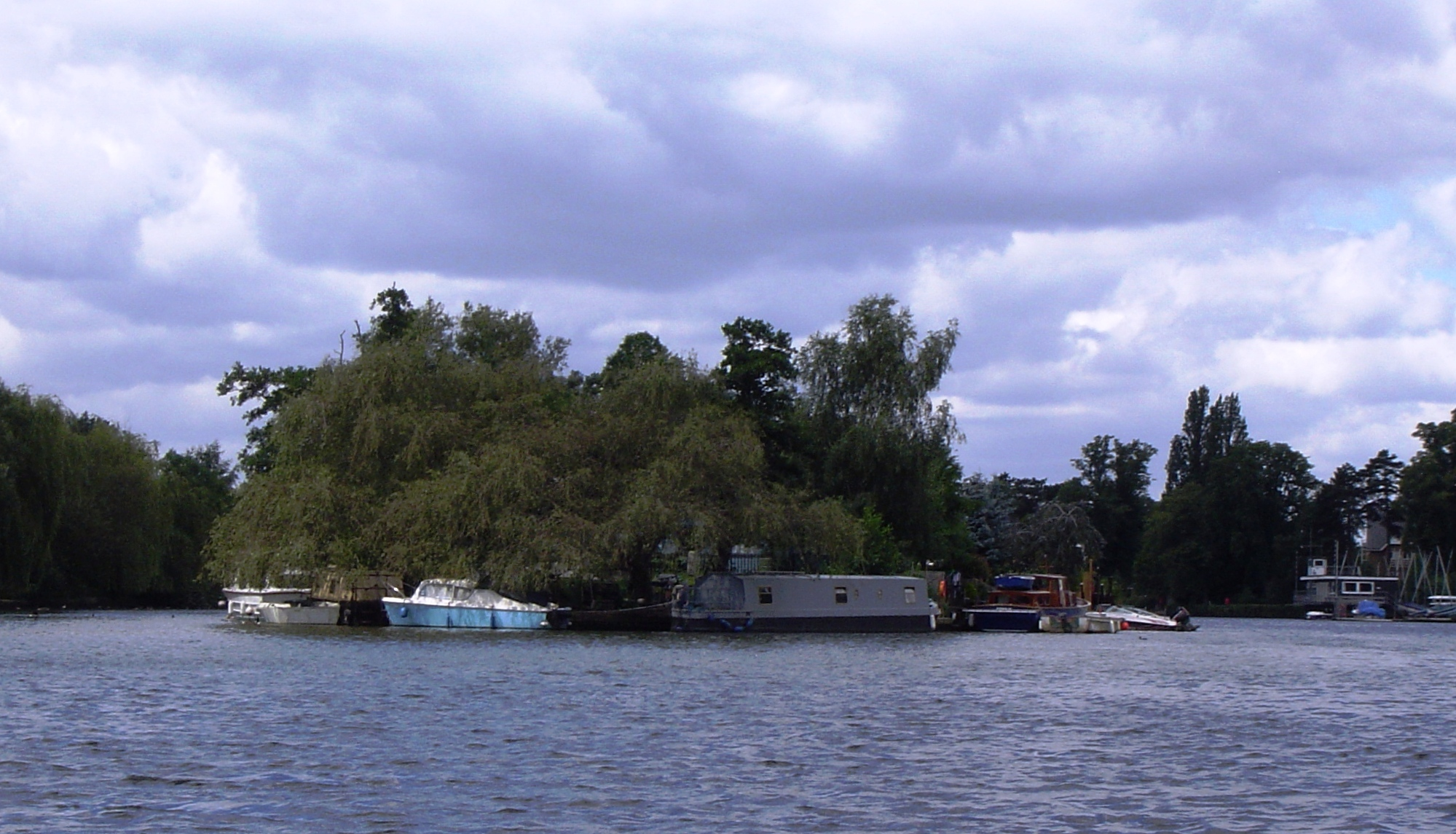
Garrick's Ait from the river downstream

Garrick's Ait (or Garrick's Eyot on Ordnance Survey maps), previously known as Shank's Eyot, is an ait in the River Thames in England on the reach above Molesey Lock, the nearest land being Moulsey Hurst (park) (Note: A long ellipse, distance to the near bank is 13 to 30 metres) on the Surrey bank and the opposite bank being a much narrower riverside park of Hampton. It is the only island in the United Kingdom named after an actor.

== Geography ==
It is 330 m upstream from Tagg's Island (Note: Distance is following the slight curve of the river to a bank-following line in line with the island tips; straight-line distance measures 310 m) which is more than twice the width and length. On the island are 20 houses, it being historically divided into 26 plots, but two of these, including the eastern tip, have always been trees and mooring space, respectively. Two of the approximately equal-sized plots, with few exceptions, have been combined into one. It is inaccessible except by boat.

== History ==
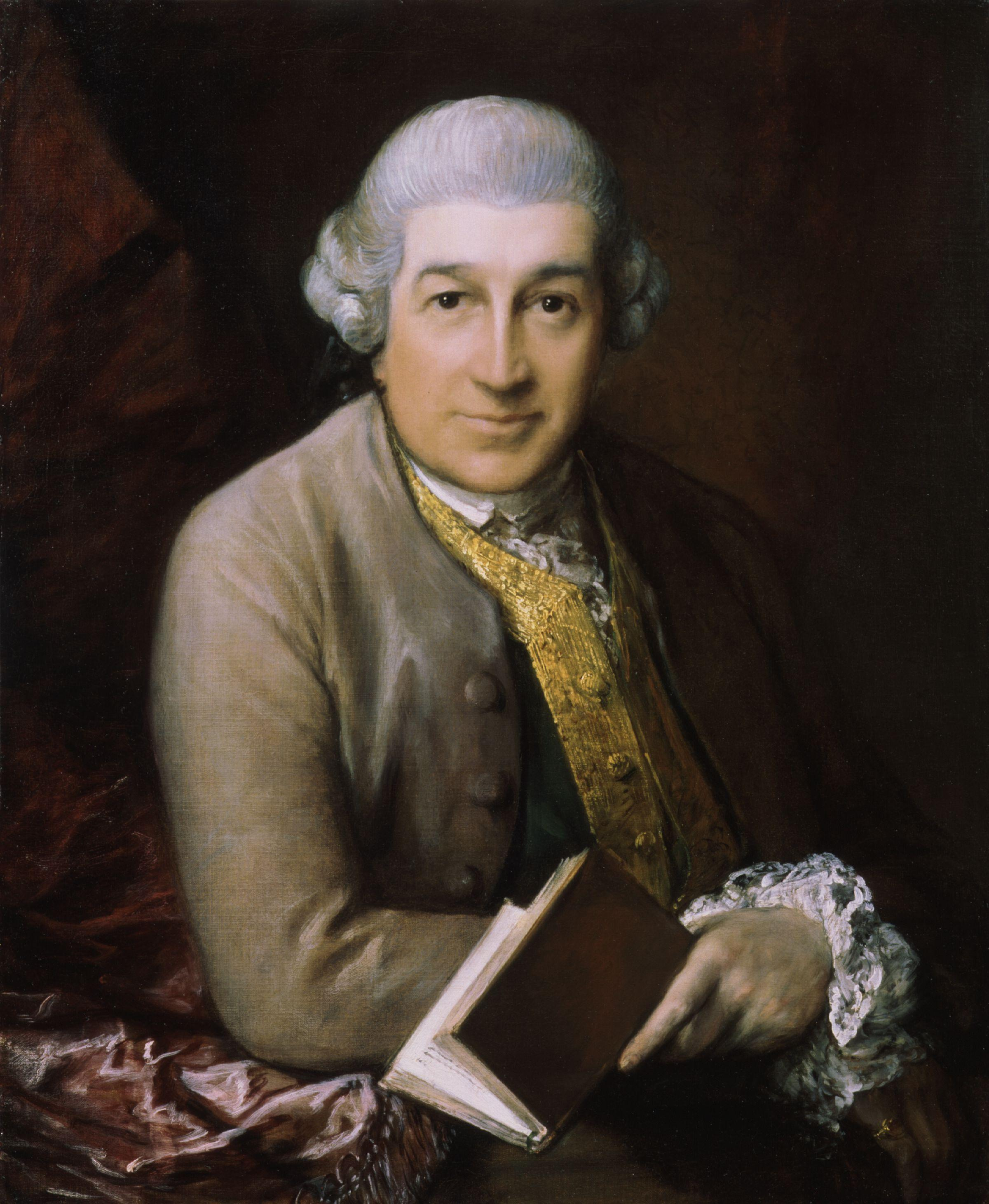
Portrait of David Garrick by Thomas Gainsborough

Garrick's Ait is named after David Garrick, the actor whose Temple to Shakespeare and Villa (house) are on the Hampton bank and as such is the only island in the country named after an actor. In common with most Thames islands near developed places, it became used for growing and harvesting willow/weeping willow trees when they arrived in the country in the 18th century. Wood from pollarding could be used for cricket bats, paddles, ladders, gun stocks, crates and poles for fences. Harvested branches, called osiers, are strong, flexible and resistant to rot – they were used for fish traps, basket making and for reinforcing riverbanks.

== See also ==
- Islands in the River Thames
- River Thames

== Notes and references ==
Notes

Next island upstream	River Thames	Next island downstream
Benn's Ait	Garrick's Ait	Tagg's Island
