= Sailing on the River Thames =

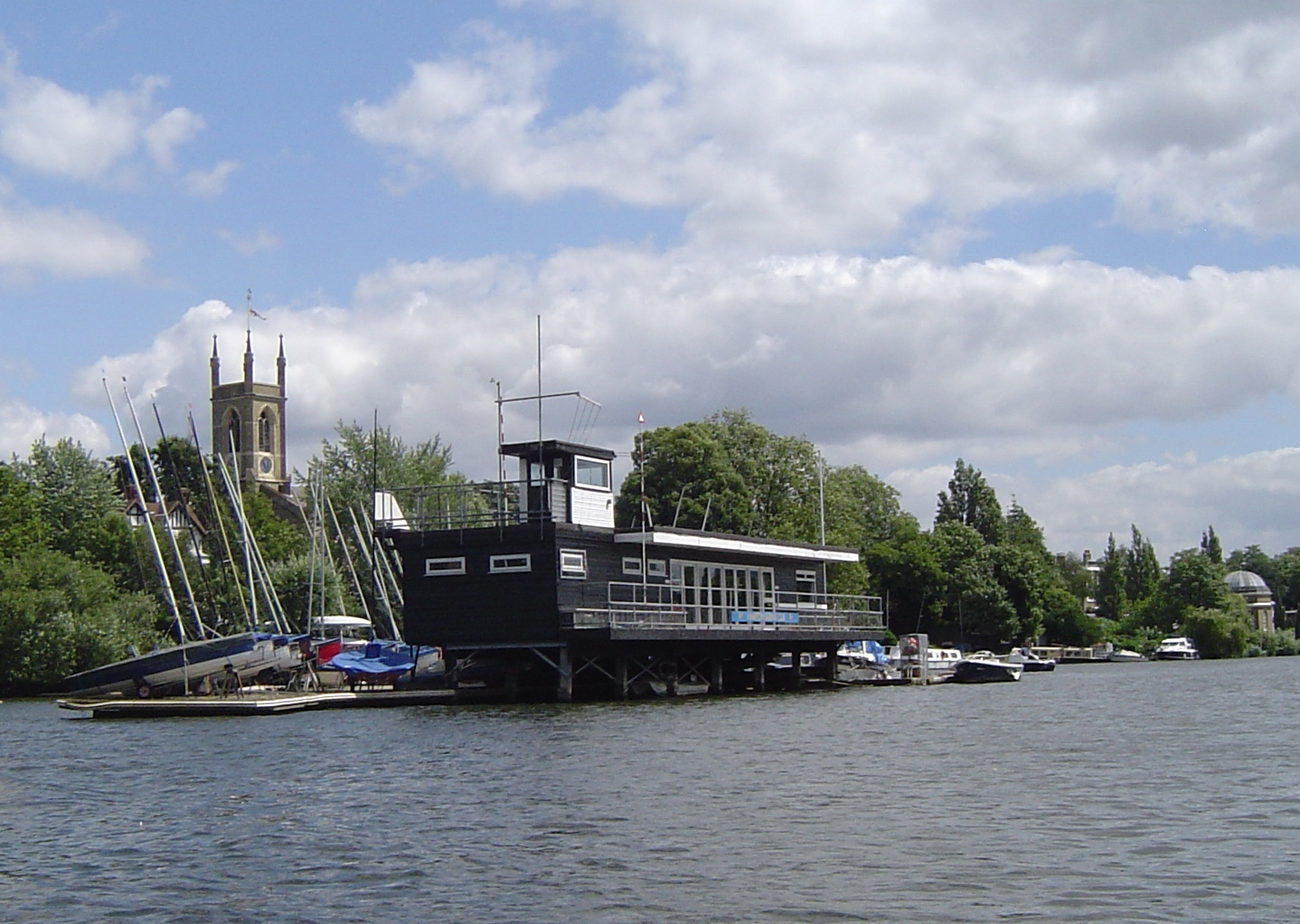
Hampton Sailing Club above Molesey Lock

Enterprises and Lasers racing on the Tideway

Sailing on the River Thames is practised on both the tidal and non-tidal reaches of the river. The highest club upstream is at Oxford. The most popular sailing craft used on the Thames are lasers, GP14s, Wayfarers and Enterprises. One sailing boat unique to the Thames is the Thames Rater, which is sailed around Raven's Ait.

Clubs in the Lower Thames (Thames Estuary) include:

- Gravesend Sailing Club in Gravesend, Kent
- Erith Yacht Club near Erith, Kent
- Thurrock Yacht Club in Thurrock
- Island Yacht Club in Canvey Island, Essex
- Leigh-On-Sea Sailing Club in Leigh-On-Sea, Essex

Clubs in and near the London section of the Thames include:

- Greenwich Yacht Club in Greenwich
- Docklands Sailing And Watersports Centre at Millwall Dock
- Capital Sailing School at Millwall Dock
- The Ahoy Centre in Deptford
- The Surrey Docks Watersports Centre at Surrey Quays
- Shadwell Sailing Club at Shadwell Basin
- Little Ship Club near Southwark Bridge
- Royal Thames Yacht Club in Knightsbridge
- South Bank Sailing Club in Putney
- Ranelagh Sailing Club in Putney
- London Corinthian Sailing Club near Hammersmith Bridge
- London Sailing Club in Central London
- Twickenham Yacht Club in Twickenham
- Strand on the Green Sailing Club in Strand on the Green, Chiswick

Clubs on the non-tidal Thames include:

- Tamesis Club in Teddington, London
- Lensbury Sailing Club at The Lensbury in Teddington, London
- Albany Park Canoe & Sailing Centre in Kingston-upon-Thames, London
- Thames Young Mariners in Ham, London
- Minima Yacht Club in Kingston-upon-Thames, London
- Thames Sailing Club in Surbiton, London
- BMYC Riverclub in Thames Ditton, London
- Hampton Sailing Club at Benn's Island in Hampton, London
- Desborough Sailing Club in Shepperton, Surrey
- Aquarius Sailing Club in Lower Sunbury Road in Hampton, London
- Staines Sailing Club in Staines-upon-Thames, Surrey
- Upper Thames Sailing Club in Bourne End, Buckinghamshire
- Goring Thames Sailing Club in Goring-on-Thames, Oxfordshire
- Dorchester Sailing Clubnear Dorchester-on-Thames, in Abingdon, Oxfordshire
- Medley Sailing Club in Oxford, Oxfordshire

See also:

- The Thames Sailing Barge Trust
