= St Albans Riverside =

Park in Hampton, London, England

Coordinates: 51.410°N 0.352°W

St Albans Riverside is a park in Hampton in the London Borough of Richmond upon Thames. It is linear with long sides between the Thames and Hampton Court Road. It runs from southeast of Garrick's Villa and his Temple to Shakespeare, Garrick's Lawn, Thames Street to a point 90 metres southeast of the interrupting small bridge that serves Tagg's Island.

== About ==
The area has much greenery and various seating areas. It is named after Aubrey Beauclerk, 5th Duke of St Albans (1740–1802) who moved to Hampton in 1796, living in St Albans Lodge (previously St Albans Bank) before taking up Hanworth Park House.

== Local area and landmarks ==
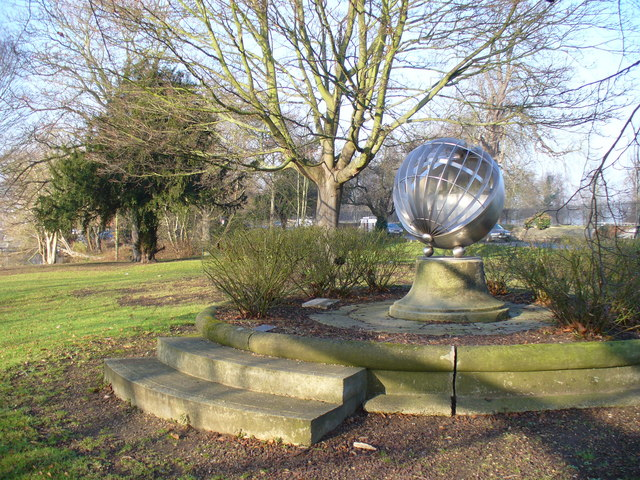
The sundial

A marina followed by sailing club is to the west and Hampton Court Green to the east. Hampton Court Palace is beyond the Green. In the park, is a sundial designed by David Harber in the shape of a steel globe. Below it is a plaque which reads:

This unique sundial designed specifically for Taggs Island consists of 13 fins, a hemisphere and rings which represent the Tropics of Capricorn and Cancer and the two polar circles. This dial has been made for the exact latitude and longitude of Taggs Island.

To read Greenwich Mean Time one must find the two opposing hour fins both bathed in sunlight. The shadow cast by these fins is shown on a band engraved at 13-minute intervals and as such at half past the hour the shadow will be to the left-hand side of the fin. When there is no shadow cast by a particular fin the time is on the hour.

David Harber Sundials
Henley-on-Thames

MCMXCIX

The sundial was commissioned by the widow of Gerald George 'Gerry' Braban (1931–1993), who lobbied for and co-funded the bridge to Tagg's Island that was built in the 1990s.

== Transport ==
The park is served by a cycleway linked with Bushy Park and buses:

- 111 between Kingston: Cromwell Road Bus Station and Heathrow Airport via Hounslow
- 216 between Kingston: Cromwell Road Bus Station and Staines: Bus Station via Sunbury Village
- R68 between East Molesey: Hampton Court Bridge and Kew: Retail Park via Teddington and Twickenham.

Footpaths reach across Bushy Park using the facing Hampton Gate to/from: Hampton Hill Gate, Hampton Wick Gate and Teddington (& Sandy Lane) Gates serving those three districts.
