= Platt's Eyot =

Coordinates: 51.4098°N 0.3716°W

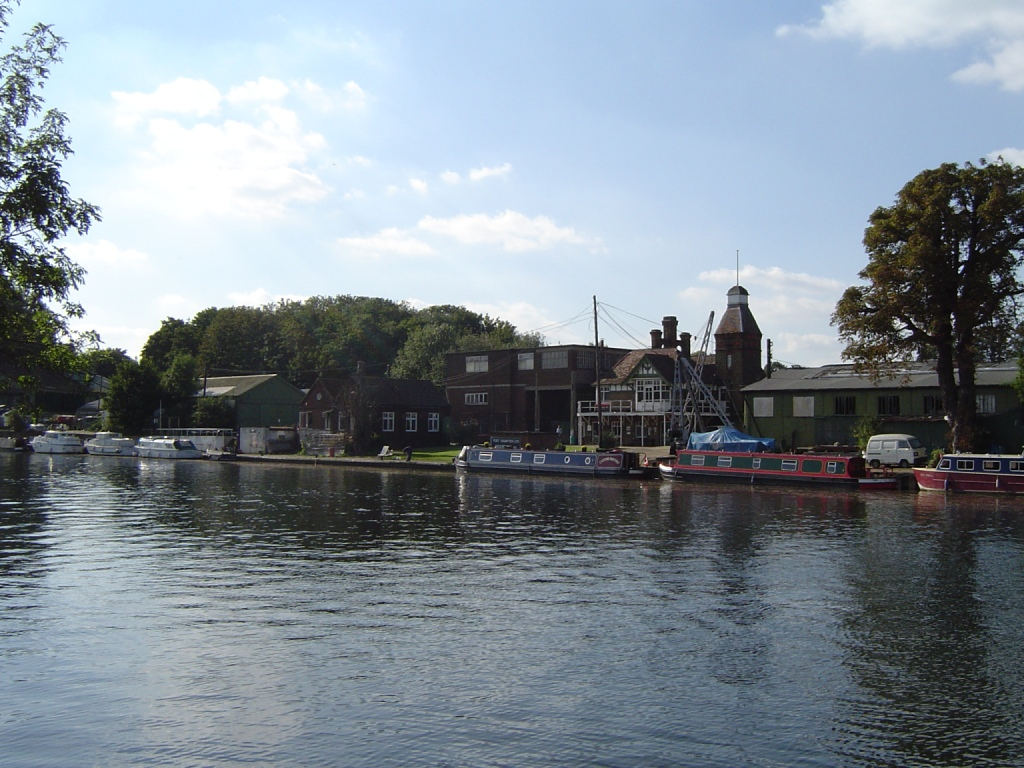
- Port Hampton on Platt's Eyot

- Location within Greater London
- OS grid reference: TQ133691
  - Charing Cross: 12.5 mi (20.1 km) ENE
- London borough: Richmond
- Ceremonial county: Greater London
- Region: London
- Country: England
- Sovereign state: United Kingdom
- Post town: HAMPTON
- Postcode district: TW12
- Dialling code: 020
- Police: Metropolitan
- Fire: London
- Ambulance: London
- UK Parliament: Twickenham
- London Assembly: South West

Platt's Eyot or Platt's Ait is an island on the River Thames at Hampton, in the London Borough of Richmond upon Thames, England, on the reach between Molesey Lock and Sunbury Lock.

== Geography ==
The island was a typical ait used for growing osiers added to by soil and sandy subsoil from excavation of the Stain Hill Reservoirs, creating the large hill as to the island's west. A suspension bridge links the island to Hampton.

The island is in the River Thames site of Metropolitan Importance for Nature Conservation. Its west part is in the Metropolitan Green Belt. It is the westernmost (and most upriver) island on the Thames in London, on a reach a full extra lock above Teddington Lock (where the upper estuary begins).

It is in a parish of the Church of England that is medieval, and did not change to reflect its links in 1970 (see below), West Molesey. It is geodesically within 850 metres (2,790 ft) of the medieval village hubs of Hampton and West Molesey.

== History ==
The name of the island is derived from Platt of Molesey who used it for growing withers.

Boatbuilding began on the island in 1868, when Thomas Tagg, who had been running a business since 1841 on Tagg's Island, about 1 km (0.62 mi) downstream, expanded by building a boatyard and house on the eastern end of Platt's Eyot. A waterworks and electrical works with a charging station were also constructed on the island; the latter was used to power electrically powered pleasure launches and canoes that were built on the island.

Around 1904 John Isaac Thornycroft set up the Hampton Launch Works on the island, an offshoot of the Chiswick boatyard that he had established in the 1860s. This boatbuilding works concentrated on cabin cruisers and speedboats, but the success of Thornycroft's operations on Platt's Eyot led to the award of contracts from the Admiralty. A new and larger facility was built in Southampton, which became Thornycroft's principal yard, but the Platt's Eyot yard continued to operate in both World Wars to build small naval craft. During the First World War, in 1916 the Admiralty commissioned a new type of fast torpedo-carrying motor launch which Thornycroft constructed secretly in its Platt's Eyot facility. Four new boat sheds were constructed on the island, probably in the same year (though the date is disputed by some), to a design by Augustine Alban Hamilton Scott. They were built using the Belfast truss system, developed during the First World War to roof wide structures such as aircraft hangars. Very few boat sheds were constructed using the technique, and these examples are now listed and inspected by Historic England.

During the Second World War, the boatyard was used to construct motor torpedo boats, motor launches and landing craft. Thornycrofts closed its boatbuilding operation on Platt's Eyot when it was taken over by Vospers in the mid-1960s. In 1960 the island was bought by Port Hampton Ltd., which diversified the use of industrial space.

Since 1941 the island has been connected to Hampton's left bank of the Thames, by a suspension bridge assembled by the Royal Engineers.

Reflecting the dominant north bank labour pool and its bridge, the island was transferred from Esher Urban District in Surrey to the London Borough of Richmond upon Thames in Greater London on 1 April 1970, by the minister's Order in Council mechanism (after due notice in The London Gazette and considering representations and whether to hold a local inquiry by the London Government Act 1963). The change was an administrative exchange, in that Thames Ditton Island transferred at the same time.

In the 21st century, several recording studios were established on the island.

On 3 May 2021, a large fire consumed the ex-industrial boat sheds.

== See also ==
- Islands in the River Thames

Next island upstream	River Thames	Next island downstream
Grand Junction Isle	Platt's Eyot	Benn's Ait
