= LCSC =

LCSC may stand for:

- Lewis–Clark State College, United States
- London Corinthian Sailing Club, England
