= Sunbury Court Island =

Island in the River Thames, England

Coordinates: 51°24′32″N 00°23′45″W

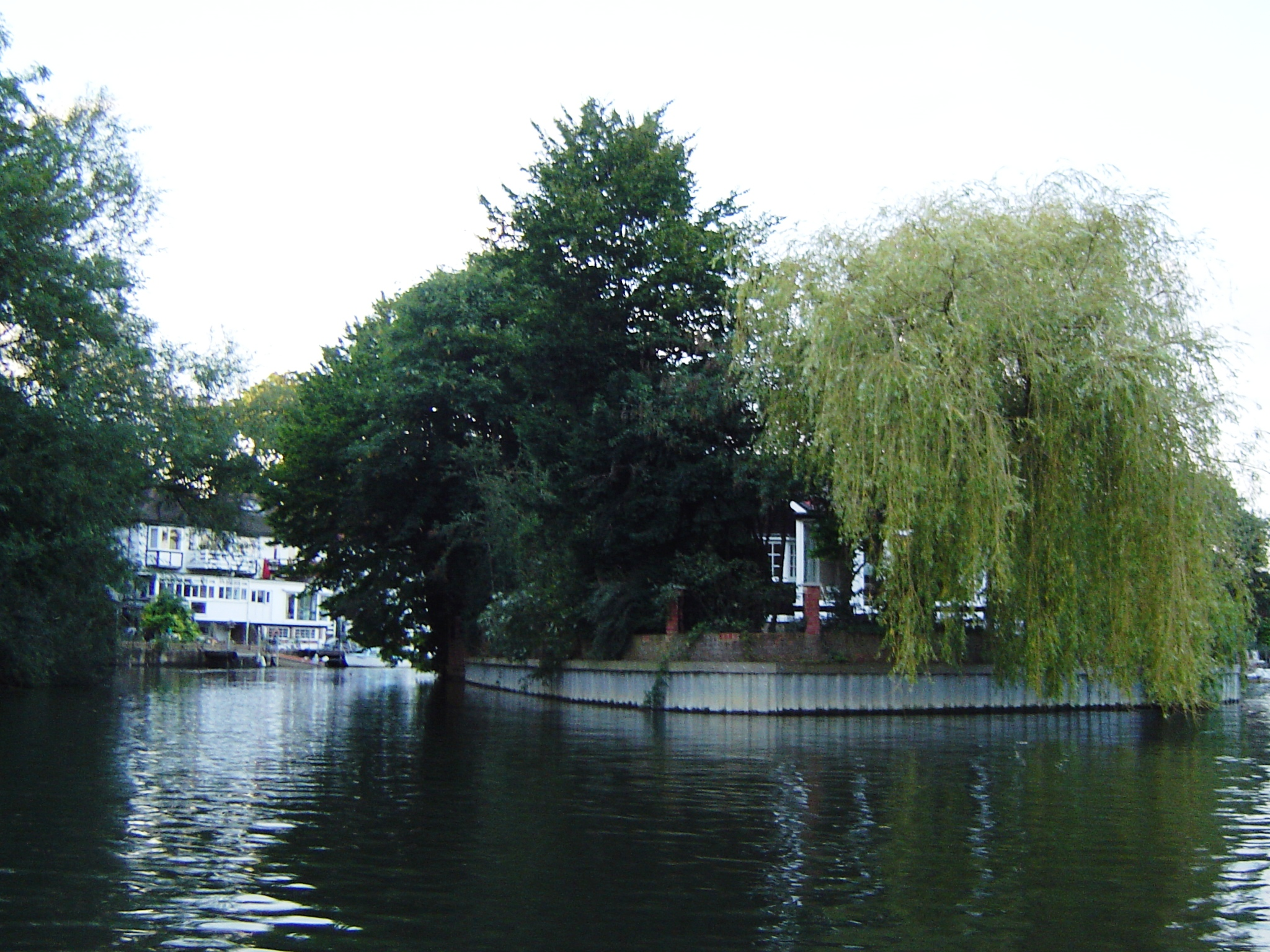
End of Sunbury Court Island from upstream

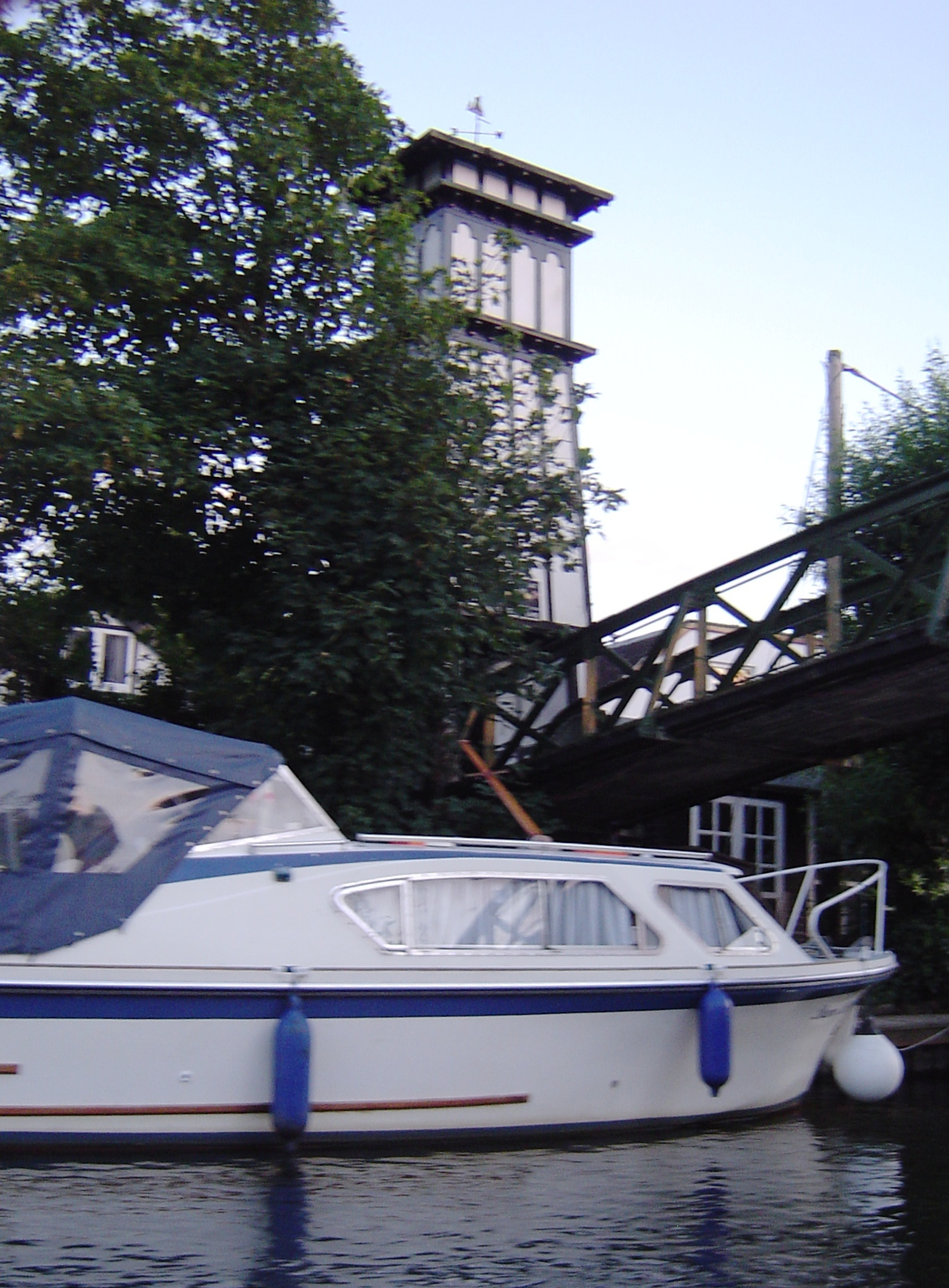
Tower by the bridge on the island

Sunbury Court Island is a long, pedestrianised residential island of houses and bungalows in the River Thames in England on the 'Sunbury and Hampton' or 'Molesey' reach, above Molesey Lock in Sunbury-on-Thames, Surrey, England.

== Attributes ==
=== Landscape and architecture ===
The island is linked to the eastern part of the developed riverside of Sunbury on the left, 'Middlesex', bank of the river. The island is pedestrianised and residential comprising 25 houses and bungalows in typically garden or patio plots with equal or smaller footprint to those homes. It is connected to a narrow point between homes on the bank by a flat iron footbridge with criss-crossed decorative railings surmounted by an ornamental Italianate square tower, pictured right.

=== Surroundings ===
From the bridge entrance the non-listed south wall, rather than railings, and entrance drive of Sunbury Court. Also visible are the higher part of the neo-classical conference centre in a grand former home, Sunbury Court, which is an international headquarters of the Salvation Army movement, Grade II* listed and dates to 1723 with later improvements and outbuildings, mainly of the present century. Rivermead Island, a park, is approximately 20 metres upstream. Sunbury Cricket Club is approximately 300 metres downstream set away from the river.

== History ==
The buildings date to summer homes of the early 20th century, before which the island was a long rural meadow. The earlier name for the island was "Hayes Ait".

== Level of flood risk ==
The island is as with most Thames-side properties in the highest category of risk identified by the Environment Agency, which means:

- The Island is assessed as having a 1 in 100 or greater annual probability of river flooding.
- The Agency will issue to individual residents flood warning alerts.

International headline-reported flooding of non-tidal stretches of the Thames took place during the 2013–2014 United Kingdom winter floods, forming its greatest single area of economic impact. Flooding reached waist depth across the island path on 7 January 2014 when a small number of residents were rescued by a large team of local emergency services called to the island's help. By 8 February 2014, approximately half of homes had been chosen to be evacuated by Fire and Rescue Services.

== See also ==
- Islands in the River Thames

Next island upstream	River Thames	Next island downstream
Rivermead Island	Sunbury Court Island	Grand Junction Isle
