= Greenwich Yacht Club =

- Burgee
- Short name: GYC
- Founded: 10 March 1908; 118 years ago
- Location: Pear Tree Wharf, Pear Tree Way, Greenwich, London
- Commodore: Nick Day
- Website: www.greenwichyachtclub.co.uk

Greenwich Yacht Club is a sailing club based in Greenwich, London. It was founded in 1908, and caters for cruiser sailors, dinghy sailors, motor-boaters, and rowers. Its officers include a commodore, vice-commodore, rear-commodore, secretary, and treasurer. The club is affiliated to the Royal Yachting Association.

== Clubhouse ==
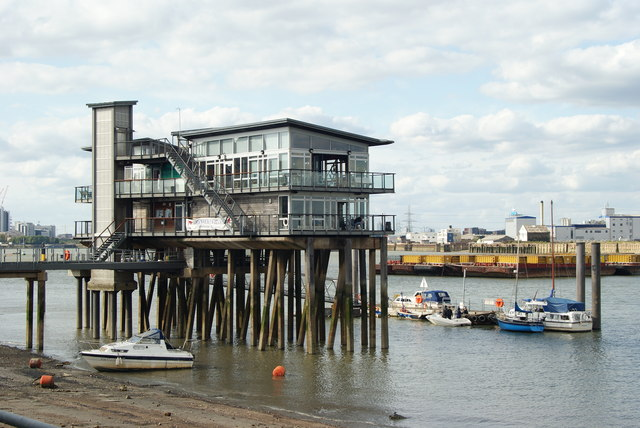
Greenwich Yacht Club clubhouse, viewed at low tide

The current clubhouse complex was designed by Fankl and Luty and was completed in 1999.The clubhouse is the only building built in the Thames itself being raised upon stilts above the waters below, and is open to the public each year as part of the London Open House. The complex includes an engineering/machining facility, sailoft, woodworking facility, an indoor work area with a capacity for two or more boats, a wedding and conference venue, plus a three-storey clubhouse situated on a dolphin in the tidal Thames reached by a bridge from landside. The complex is disabled access friendly.

== History ==
Thames watermen and river workers founded Greenwich Yacht Club in Yacht Tavern in Greenwich on 10 March 1908. For many years the club met at the tavern. Later, the Clubhouse was situated for many years on the beach adjacent to the current clubhouse. Originally, it was a beached Thames Sailing Barge "Iverna", then later a hut on the Mudlarks beach. In more recent times the club was based in what is known as the "old clubhouse" at the end of Riverway. That site was required by English Partnerships, as part of the preparation for construction of the Millennium Dome, and in exchange English Partnerships provided the club with new facilities on the previously redundant Peartree Wharf. Greenwich Yacht Club took occupation of the site early in November 1999 with a temporary clubroom in what is now the Wedding Venue. The new clubhouse was opened in June 2000.

The residential building directly behind the club has been named Iverna Quay, as a reference to the beached Thames sailing barge "Iverna".

== Membership ==
The club has more than 400 members.

== Training ==
The club is an official Royal Yachting Association training centre, and offers both shorebased and practical RYA courses, including Day Skipper Theory and Yachtmaster Theory.

== Cruising ==
The club has a strong contingent of active cruising yachts and motorboats, and organises an annual cruise to the East Coast of England.

== Racing ==
Throughout the year, the club organises and competes in a number of different races on the Thames for both dinghy and yachts.

As part of its centenary celebrations in 2008, an Extreme 40 Catamaran raced between the O2 and the club. Competitors included Dame Ellen MacArthur and Olympian Matthew Pinsent.

The club abides by the racing rules as set out by World Sailing.

== Regattas ==
- The Annual London Dinghy Regatta

== See also ==
- Sailing on the River Thames
- Yacht racing
