= Benn's Island =

Island in the River Thames, England

Coordinates: 51°24′44″N 0°21′48″W

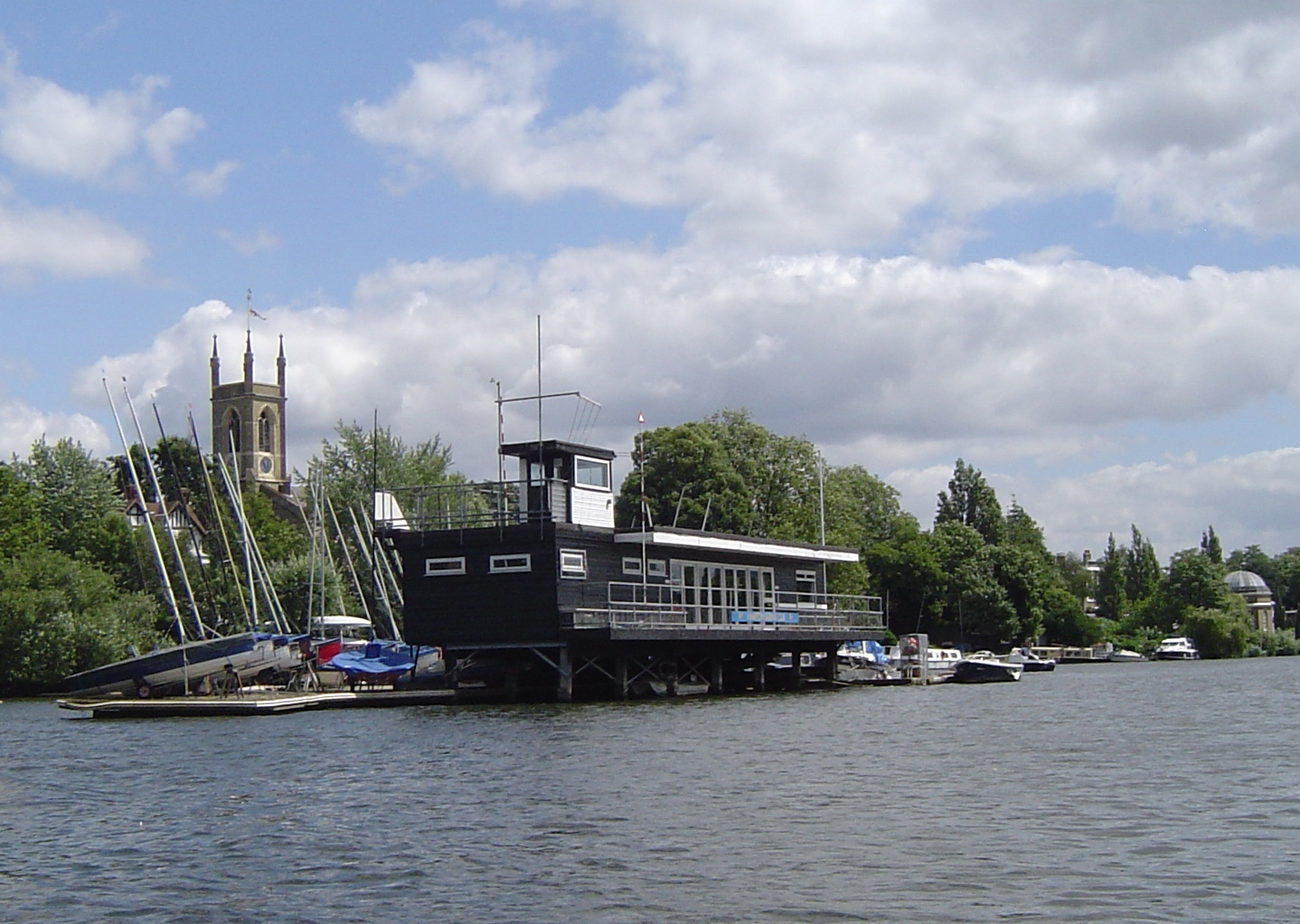
Hampton Sailing Club with boat landing stages occupies all of Benn's Island above Molesey Lock

Benn's Island, previously named Church Eyot, Kember's Eyot and sometimes referred to as Benn's Ait, (Note: It was called Church Eyot, then Kember’s Eyot around 1700, then became generally named after the family that owned Benn’s Boatyard on the left bank, which was demolished in 1947.) is a private 0.1-acre (0.040 ha) ait (island) on the River Thames south-west of London. It is among a string of narrow islands above Molesey Lock and due to its clubhouse and size – the second-smallest named island on the Thames – it has deep foundation pilings to raise the building more than 1 m above the water line.

== Location and access ==
Benn's Island, the second-smallest public map-named island on the Thames, is close to the left bank of the River Thames at Hampton, in the London Borough of Richmond upon Thames in England, on the reach above Molesey Lock, the second non-tidal reach of the river. The water between the island and the near bank is shallow and navigable with care to small vessels.

The clubhouse is linked to Benn's Alley, a narrow slipway on the northern bank by a manually operated pedestrian chain ferry at the downstream end. Hampton Ferry connecting to Molesey operates to the east of the island using a separate set of steps or slipway and directly facing to St Mary's Church.

== Use ==
In the 19th century the island was used by the then Thames Valley Sailing Club, transforming to the Middle Thames Yacht and motorboat club on Sunbury Lock Ait, whose then headquarters were a houseboat moored at Benn's Island and which was destroyed by fire in 1900. Since 1945 it has been leased by Hampton Sailing Club which also conducts some paddleboarding and shares the reach with two school watersports clubs and Molesey Boat Club. In 1962 the clubhouse was built on the piles at Benn's Island. Extensive building works and piling make on casual observance the island seem wholly artificial, disguising its natural small core with substantial extensions.

== See also ==
- Islands in the River Thames
- Sailing on the River Thames

== Notes and references ==
Notes

Next island upstream	River Thames	Next island downstream
Platt's Eyot	Benn's Island	Garrick's Ait
