= Grand Junction Isle =

Island in the River Thames, England

Coordinates: 51°24′35.5″N 00°23′18″W

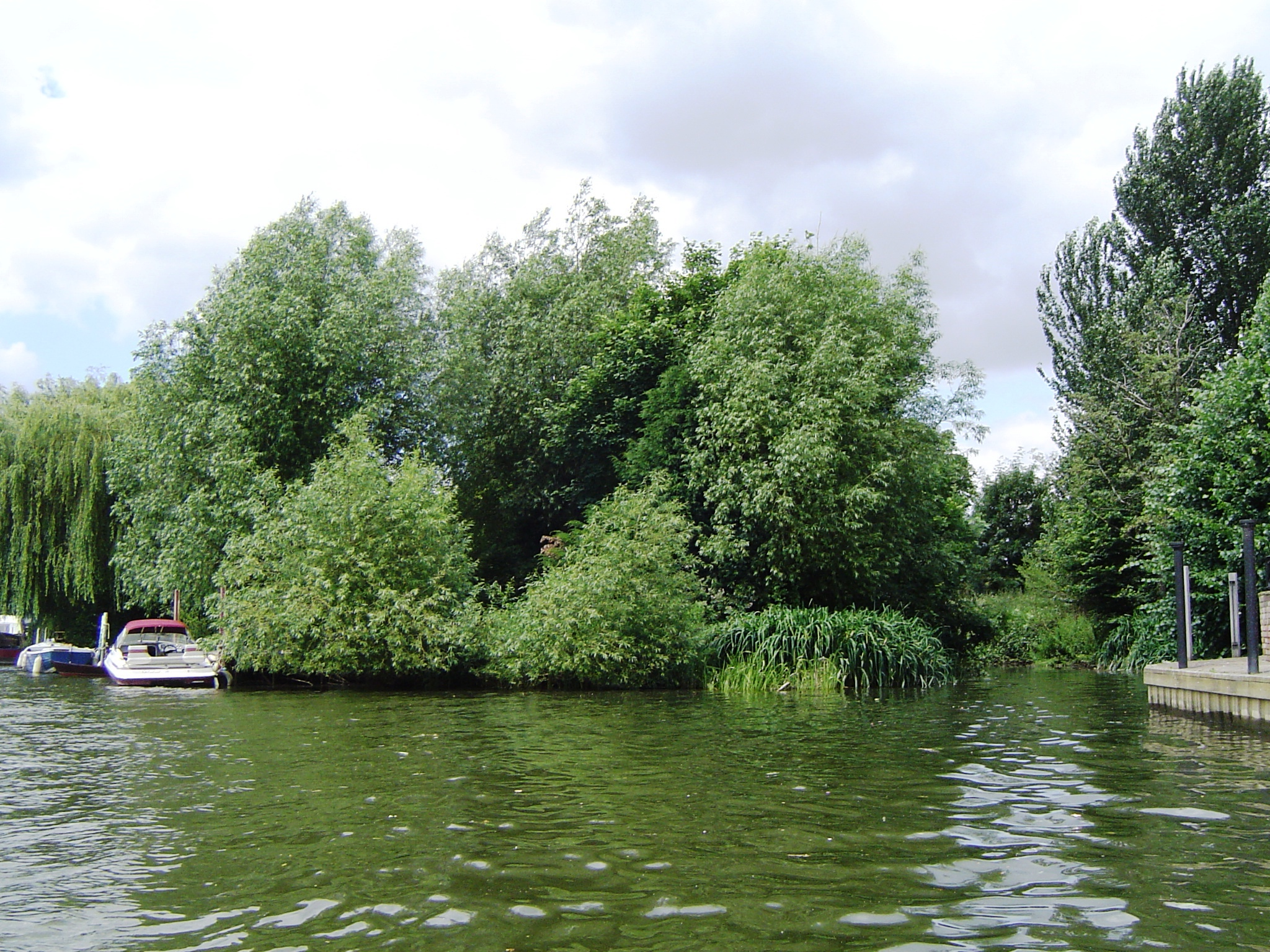
Grand Junction Isle from downstream

Grand Junction Isle is a small island in the River Thames on the reach above Molesey Lock at Sunbury-on-Thames, Surrey, England. It is just downstream of Sunbury Court Island, which is three times longer and also close to the north bank.

== Geography ==
The island is more of a lozenge than ellipse. At its greatest extent it is 35m long and 15m wide. Within the low lying, tree-covered, somewhat tenuous land of the island are six weekend chalets of garden summerhouse size with mooring spaces. It is linked to the northern bank, the residential far south-east of Sunbury, by a footbridge.

== History ==
The island takes its name from the Grand Junction Waterworks Company which was one of three companies operating its 'Hampton Water Works' which straddle the Hampton/Sunbury border such that the border has been moved to accommodate the westernmost reservoir within Hampton. The company built a water intake on the island to feed that reservoir and others, which in turn feed into filter beds, filters and advanced chemical and electromagnetic treatment works owned and operated by Thames Water. The island had been "Purvis Ait". It is currently owned by The Environment Agency.

== See also ==
- Islands in the River Thames

Next island upstream	River Thames	Next island downstream
Sunbury Court Island	Grand Junction Isle	Platts Eyot
