= Sunbury Amateur Regatta =

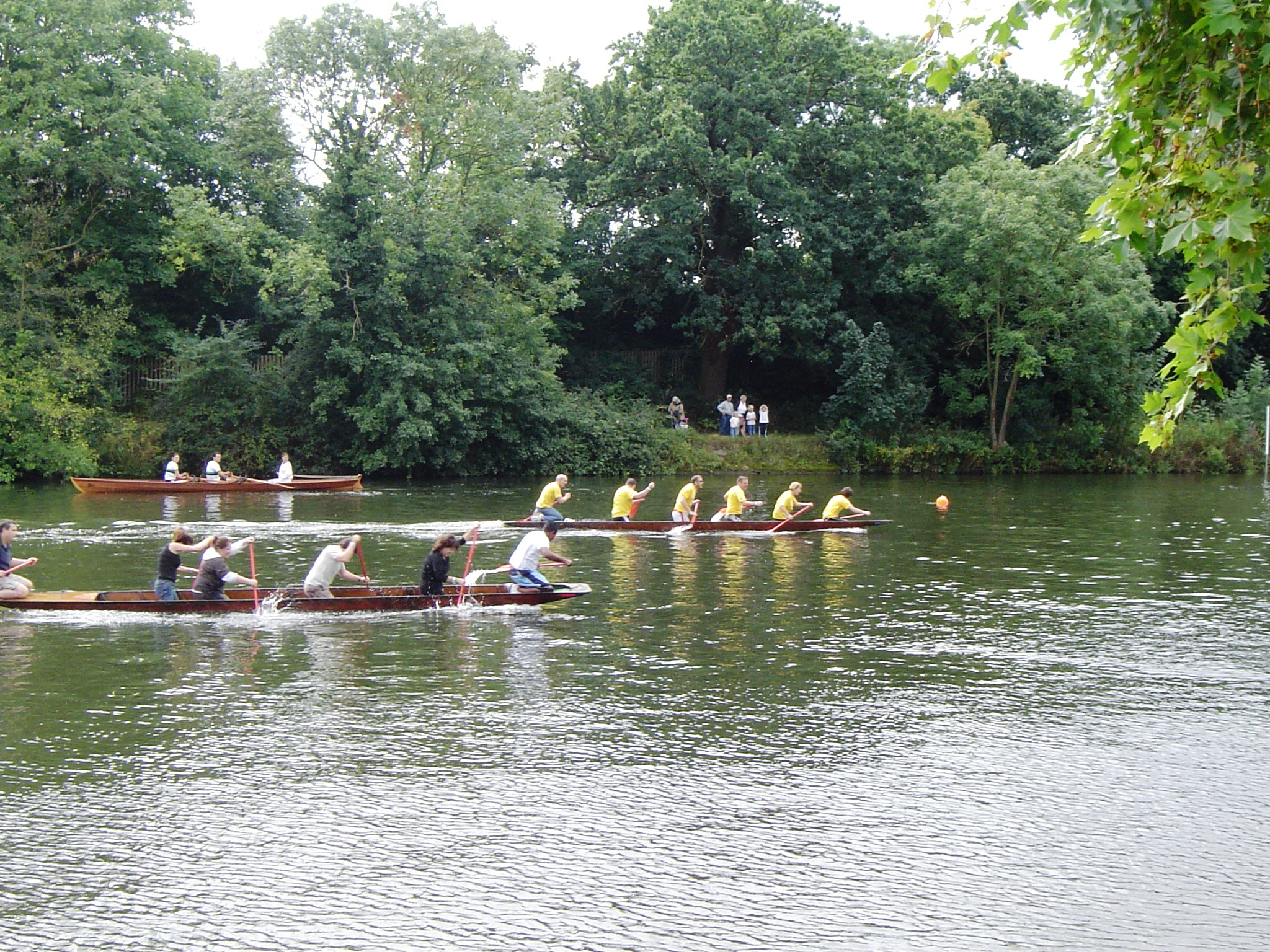
Dongola race at Sunbury Regatta

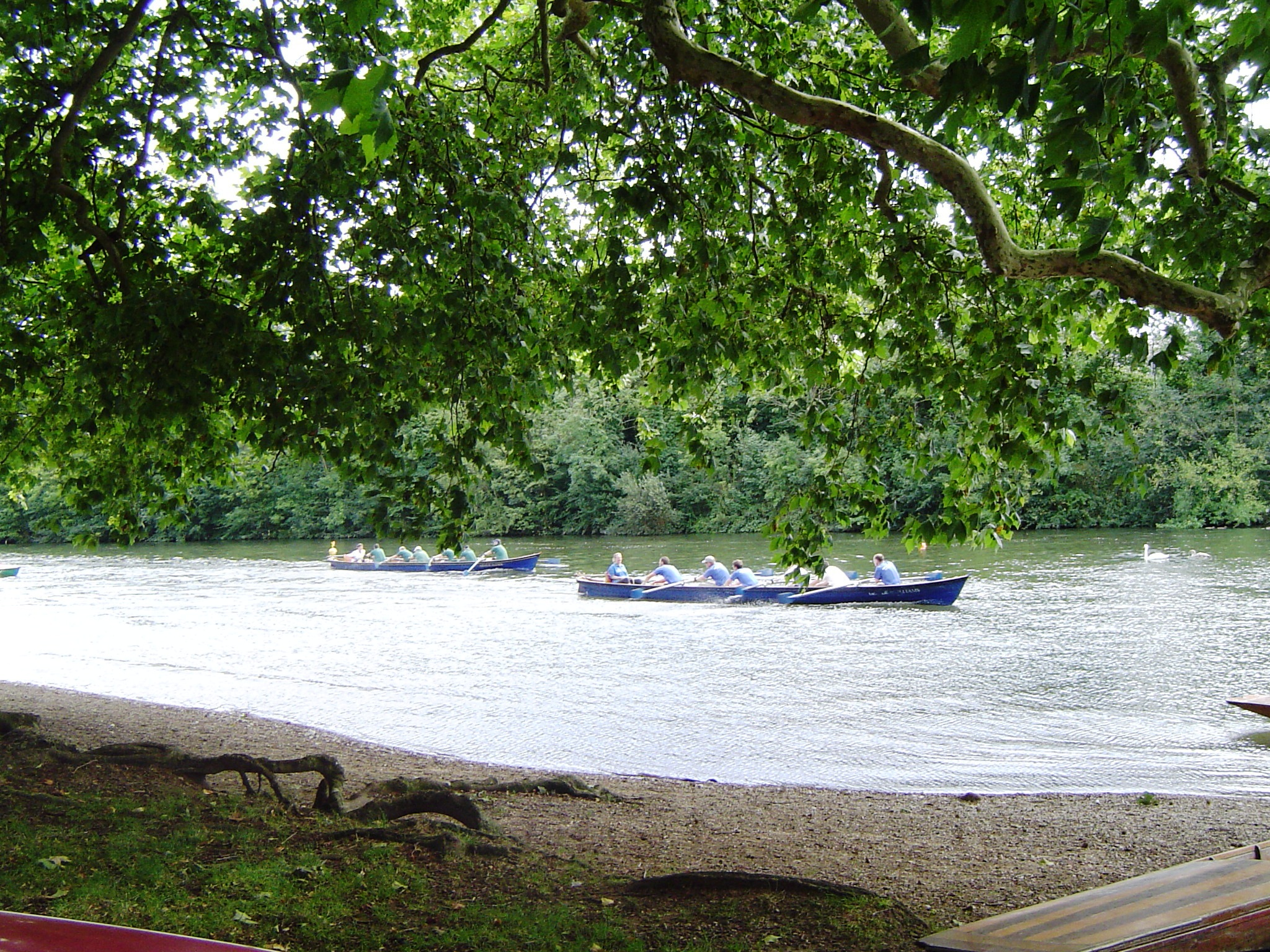
Cutter race at Sunbury Regatta

The Sunbury Amateur Regatta is a regatta on the River Thames at Sunbury-on-Thames, Surrey, England with a rare visitors' boats lights display and fireworks event. It is for mainly traditional wooden types of boats with a few events for small sculling boats since its instigation in 1877 (today known as racing shells) taking place by convention on a Saturday in early to mid August. The Edith Topsfield Junior Regatta takes place the following day.

== Location ==
This regatta's many land activities used to take place at Rivermead Island. Racing takes place on the Thames alongside from morning through to mid-and afternoon on the 'Sunbury and Hampton Reach' also known as 'Molesey Reach'. From 2025 the regatta has moved upstream to Desborough Sailing Club in Shepperton.

== Races ==
Races include British Rowing-conforming club events as follows, all of which require the competitors to vouch for a greater than 50m in full clothes swimming ability as a precondition of entry:

Boat class	Number of competitors	Wind and stream conditions	Whether requires a safety-regulated club/British Rowing membership
Punting	1	Reasonably good	yes
Dongola racing	Six people in a kneeling posture (including at least two ladies)	Reasonably good	no - helmsman and ability to swim required
Canoeing	1 & 2	To severe	no - case-by-case evidenced achievement-based
Sculling	1 & 2	To severe (category dependent)	yes

The sculling course culminates downstream at Sunbury Court Island.

== Land events ==
A lively atmosphere on the island includes stalls, children's entertainment, live music, tug of war competition and refreshments.

== Lights display ==
The regattas have long been among the last regattas in the rowing year due accommodating its firework finale at sunset and procession of illuminated boats including old small merchant vessels with masts and luxury motor cruisers.

== History ==
The regatta was inaugurated in 1877 with events for sweep-oar pairs, sculls (as racing shells), punts, canoes and swimming — for the first fifty years Sunbury hosted a parallel Tradesmen's or Town regatta for professional watermen. The original course was downstream from the very end of the Sunbury Reach beside Sunbury Lock. For some years at the end of the 19th century the regatta hosted the Thames Punting Club championships at that sport.

The event is followed on the Sunday by the Edith Topsfield Junior Regatta, founded in 1932 for children aged 7 to 16.

== See also ==
- Rowing on the River Thames
