= Ash Island =

Island in the River Thames, England

Coordinates: 51°24′26″N 0°20′56″W

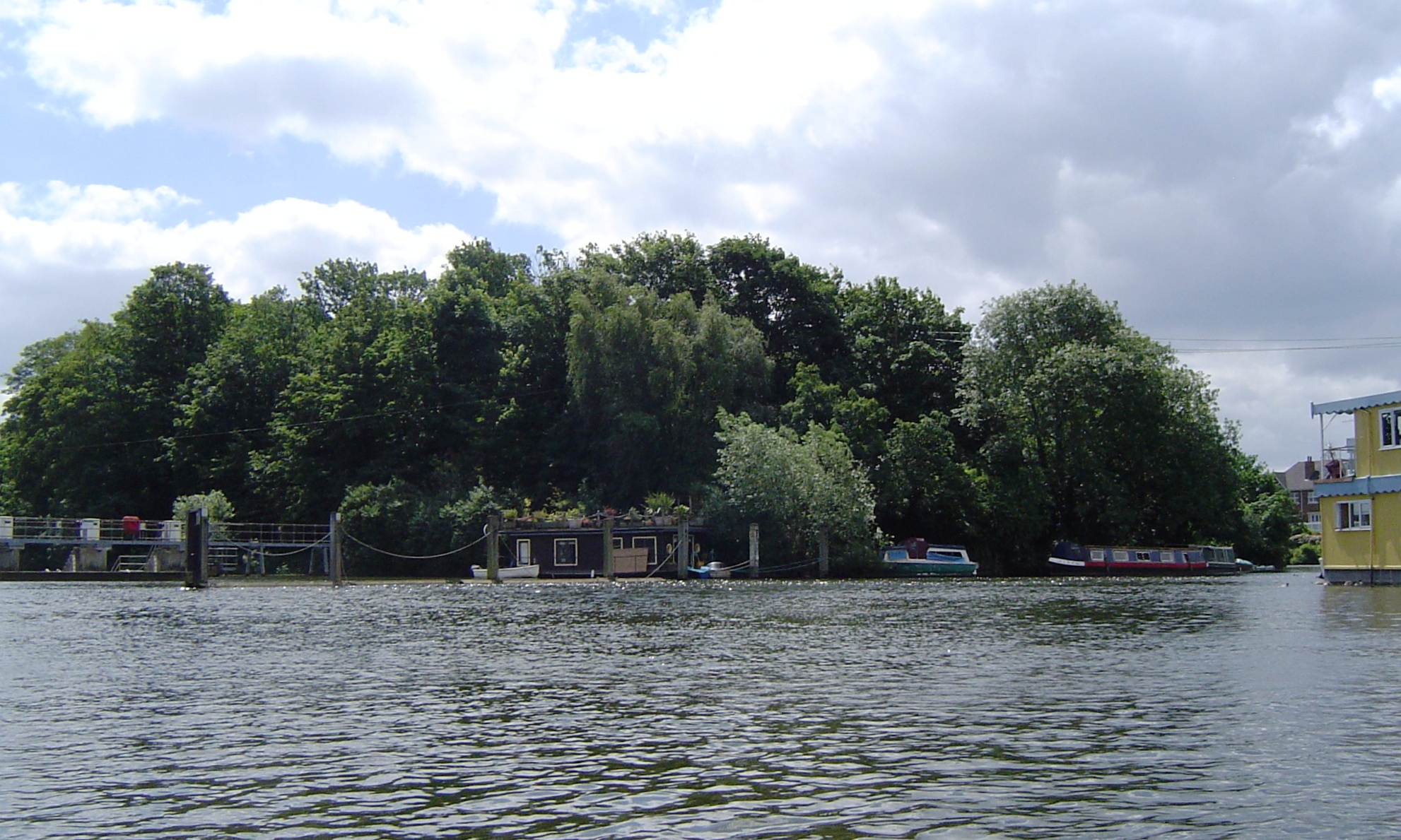
Ash Island from upstream

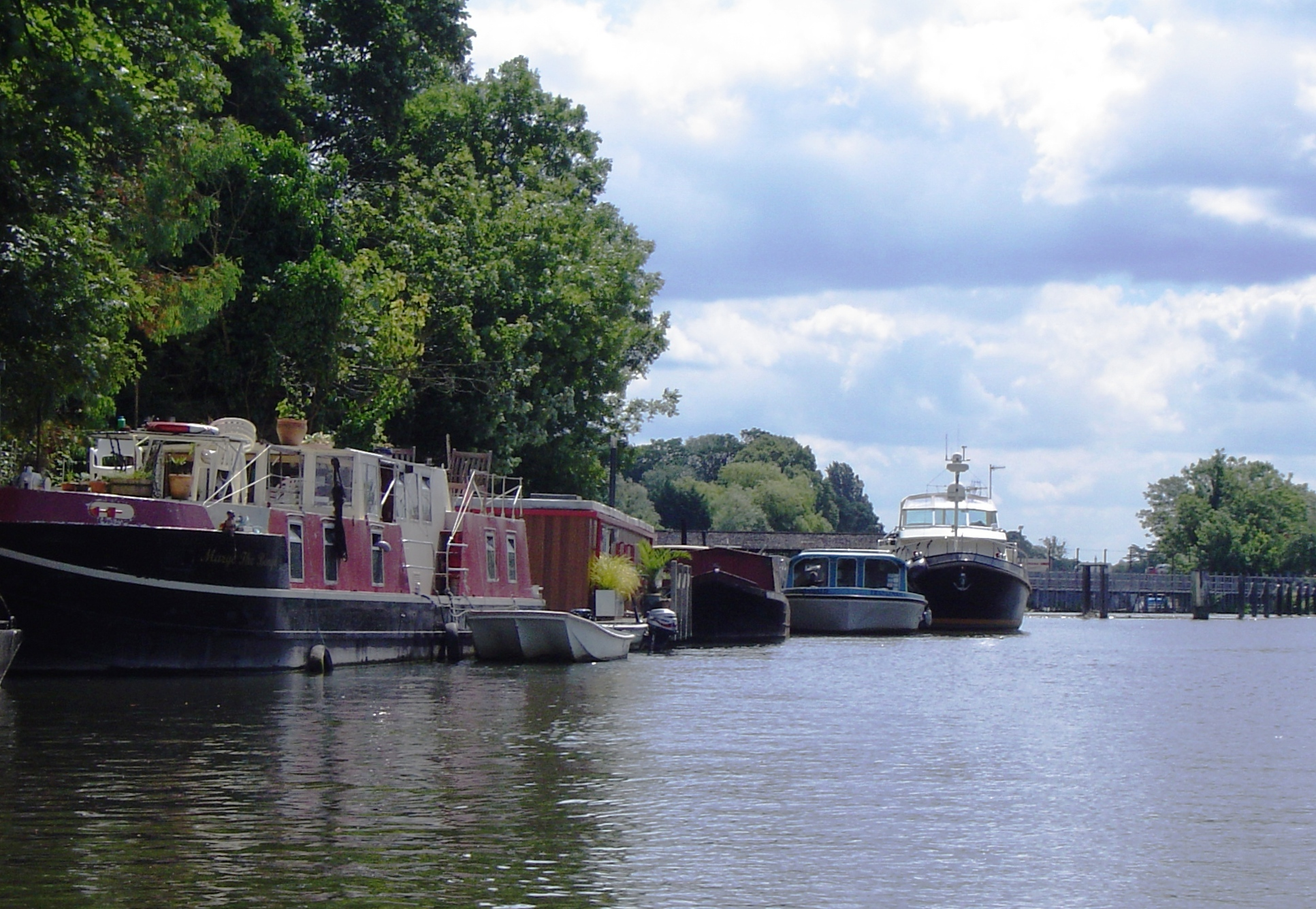
Boatyard at Ash Island above the main Molesey weir

Ash Island is a forested, drop-shaped island in the River Thames in England, across the weir of Molesey Lock within Greater London on its border.

In the same way as Hampton Court, Ash Island's post town is East Molesey (KT8) and the island is administratively within the London Borough of Richmond upon Thames. The main weir is at the downstream end of the island connecting to the lock; the second weir is at the upstream end and connects to the Hampton Court bank. Consequently, there is a difference of several feet in the water level surrounding the island.

The island is privately owned and has a boatyard on side towards the lock, and moorings on the lower side. Most of the island is densely covered in trees, its maximum length is 236m, maximum width 90m and it is 25m downstream of Tagg's Island.

== See also ==
- Islands in the River Thames

- Islands in the River Thames listed in order upstream from the sea.

Next island upstream	River Thames	Next island downstream
Tagg's Island	Ash Island	Thames Ditton Island
