= Rivermead Island =

Island in the River Thames

Coordinates: 51°24′25″N 0°24′04″W

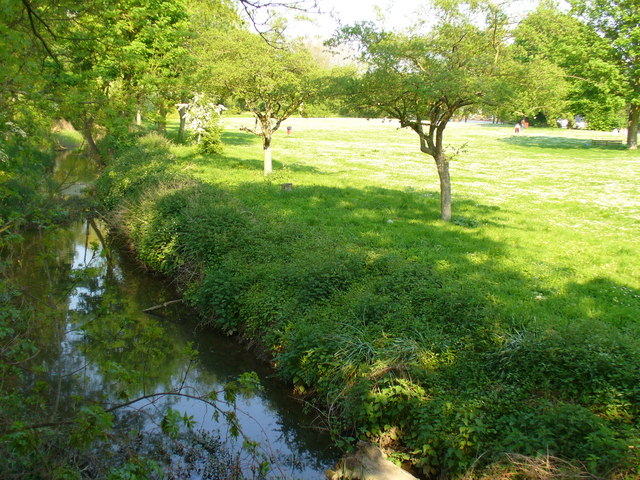
Part of Rivermead Island, a park and annual regatta celebration ground.

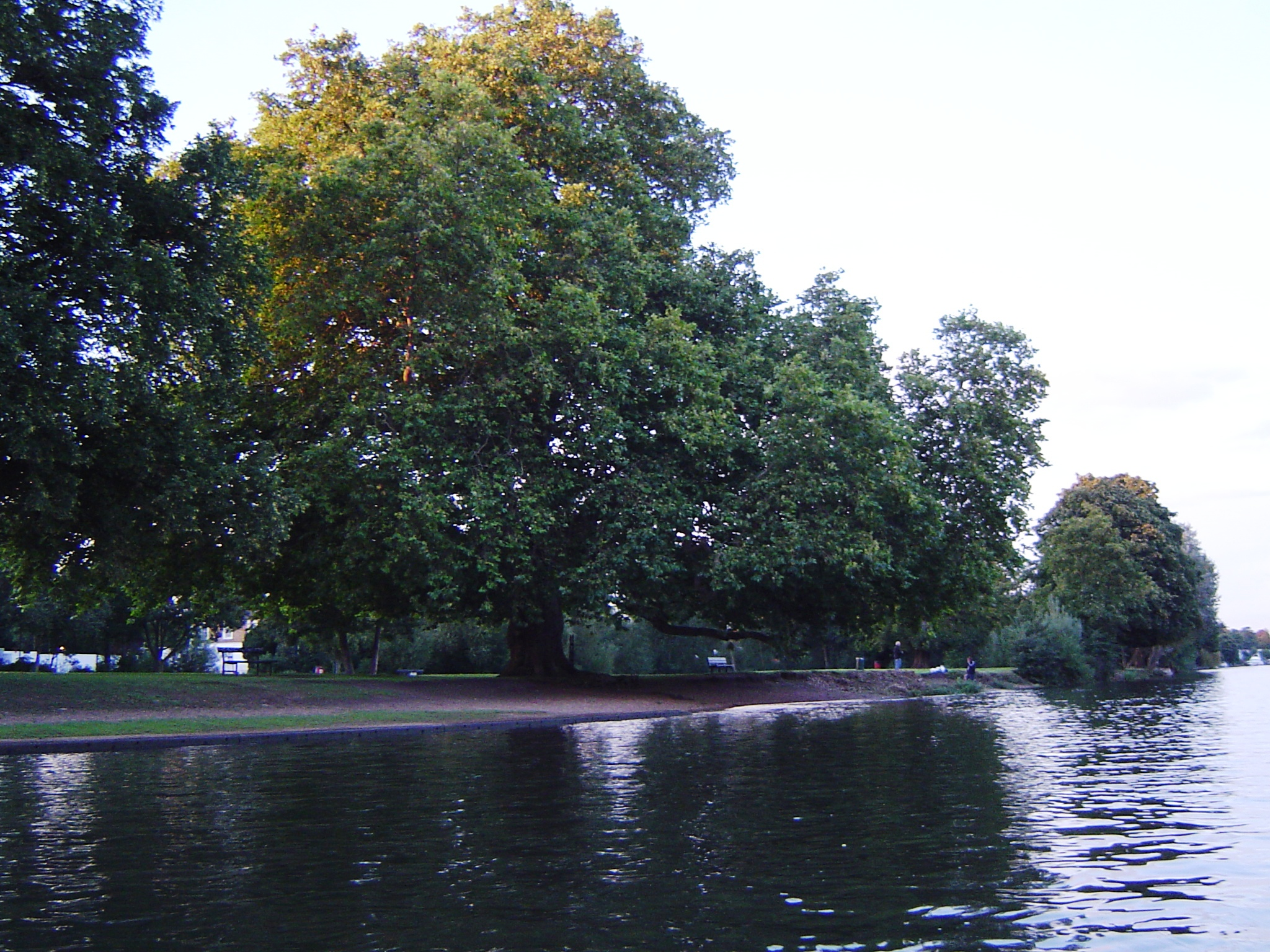
Rivermead Island from the river

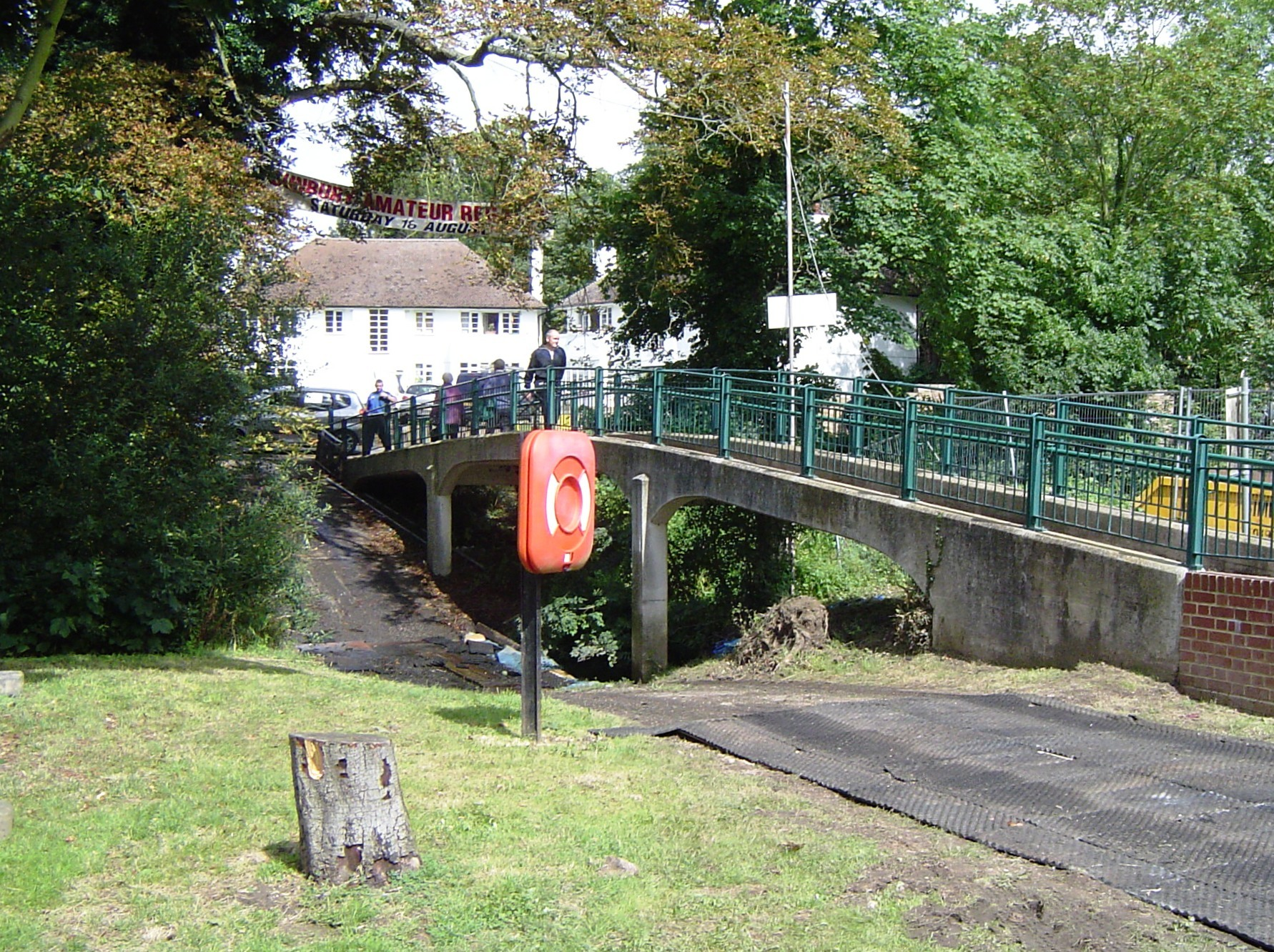
Footbridge and ford coming to the island

Rivermead Island is a flat grassy island in the River Thames on the reach above Molesey Lock at Sunbury-on-Thames, Surrey, England which is owned mostly by Spelthorne and as to a small part by Elmbridge Borough Council.

== Geography ==
The island is a meadow lightly covered with trees with dense patches, shrubbery and reeds at each end. The former common land meadow is publicly open and Metropolitan Green Belt. It is a long area of open riverside on the side of the river opposite the Thames Path — from here the point of Sunbury Lock Island can be seen. It is connected to the bank by an elegant arched footbridge with simple metal balustrades and separate painted round handrails and in dry periods four-wheel vehicle access is possible via a ford of the narrow backwater separating it from the land. Rivermead was originally two islands, the much smaller, downstream part being Swan's Rest, since the late 20th century completely joined, remaining part of Elmbridge as its fishing rights were anciently conferred to the parish south of the river.

=== Flood risk ===
At 9 metres above Ordnance Datum sea level whereas residential roads in Sunbury are at predominantly more than 10 metres, the island floods often when there is other non-tidal Thames flooding. In February 2014 the island was briefly completely submerged providing the main emergency flood meadow dealing with copious rainfall across the flood plain on the 'Sunbury stretch' of the Molesey Reach. Hurst Park on the 'Hampton stretch' of the reach is the other main flood meadow partly inhabited by tower block flat owners on the south bank, approximately 1.5 miles (2.4 km) downstream. Most other inhabited islands have more elevated plots preventing or reducing the extent of fluvial (riparian) flooding.

=== Nearby ===
To augment the conveniences of public houses and restaurants in the village on the thin strip of land north of the island a Borough Council-managed and owned car park is behind a low wall facing the upper end on the Sunbury bank.

== Annual event ==
The Sunbury Amateur Regatta which is a major Thames Skiff regatta takes place (as to its land activities) approximately in late August each year, attracting a funfair and local dignitaries.

== See also ==
- Lower Sunbury
- Islands in the River Thames

Next island upstream	River Thames	Next island downstream
Sunbury Lock Ait	Rivermead Island	Sunbury Court Island
