= The Ahoy Centre =

UK charity

The AHOY Centre
- A Charity Changing Peoples Lives Through Sailing
- Formation: 2004
- Legal status: Registered charity
- Purpose: Providing sailing for people with disabilities or disadvantaged backgrounds
- Location: Borthwick Street, Deptford, London
- Region served: United Kingdom
- Website: www.ahoy.org.uk

The AHOY Centre is a registered charity based in Deptford, London that helps disadvantaged children and people with disabilities to become involved in watersports and to gain certifications of the Royal Yachting Association (RYA) in activities such as sailing, powerboating and first aid. It has been identified as a major cultural project by the Greater London Authority.

== History ==
The name of the AHOY Centre is an acronym of Adventure Help and Opportunities for Youth Centre. It was officially opened in May 2004 by Anne, Princess Royal and, since then, the centre has assisted over 5,000 people to try sailing, to attend courses, and to gain recognised qualifications. The Princess Royal also revisited in 2011 to rename the specially adapted boat - which can be sailed solely by people with disabilities - The AHOY Freedom.

== Activities ==
The AHOY Centre works with partners such as the Metropolitan Police, the Safer London Foundation and local London boroughs to run a variety of sailing and powerboating courses for people otherwise unable to take part in watersports due to physical disability or social disadvantage.

The charity is an accredited RYA sailability centre and has instructors, boats and launching equipment that enable it to provide tailored sailing courses for people with serious disabilities, including those in wheelchairs. This equipment includes a 40 ft long power-boat, the first of its kind in the world, that is designed so that it can be crewed entirely by people with disabilities. The boat has CCTV cameras allowing the crew to easily view all angles around the craft, and state-of-the-art controls that can be used just with small finger movements.

In addition, the centre's partners in the probation service and the police refer to the centre youths identified as being at-risk due to their home circumstances or their association with gang violence or religious fundamentalism. Such youths benefit from the structured environment, the new and challenging activities, and the presence of strong role models. They may go on to gain qualifications and even become instructors in their own right. As one put it:

AHOY has helped me and my behaviour. I have started to clear up my life, started going back to school and not hanging around the 'mates' that always got me into trouble.

— 'Billie',

== Volunteers and staff ==
Around 230 volunteers of all ages assist at the centre, where they may take on a variety of roles. Younger children are taught to sail, with the aim of becoming instructors later, and also assist with centre maintenance and boat repairs.

Appropriately qualified adult volunteers may instruct sessions, drive a safety boat, or assist from the shore. Alternatively, they may help with a variety of administrative tasks.

A small number of paid, full-time staff manage the day-to-day running of the charity, including outreach, fundraising and managing volunteers. The overall running of the charity is done by a board of trustees.

== Fundraising ==
The AHOY Centre receives grants from Local Government bodies, including the Safer London Foundation. It has received around £170,000 in National Lottery funding over a number of years. It also relies heavily on independent fundraising and donations. In June 2010, two teams of rowers raised money for the centre by successfully rowing across the English Channel in Thames waterman cutters.
