= London Corinthian Sailing Club =

Coordinates: 51°29′26″N 0°14′20″W

LCSC Burgee

The London Corinthian Sailing Club is based on the river Thames at Hammersmith. Its activities include Dinghy sailing and racing on the river, and yachting in the Solent and further afield, as well as an active social side including 'Club Nights' every Tuesday evening.

An RYA-approved offshore training establishment with a full training programme is provided, including RYA theory and practical courses for Competent Crew, day skipper, coastal skipper and yachtmaster.

Dinghy racing takes place most weekends throughout the year and some evenings during the summer. Mostly dinghies raced are Enterprises and Lasers. In addition to sailing at Hammersmith, there are regular events against other dinghy clubs on the Thames and clubs further afield.

The yachting programme includes cruises (around the UK, cross-channel, in the Mediterranean and the Caribbean), training weekends, treasure hunts and races organised by the club. The club also participates in winter and spring series racing in the Solent, Cowes Week, Round the Island Race, Cork week, offshore JOG races, RORC races, the Fastnet race and some member-organised events.

The clubhouse is a Georgian building with river views and full facilities.

== See also ==
- Sailing on the River Thames
