= Garrick's Villa =

Coordinates: 51.4126°N 0.3587°W

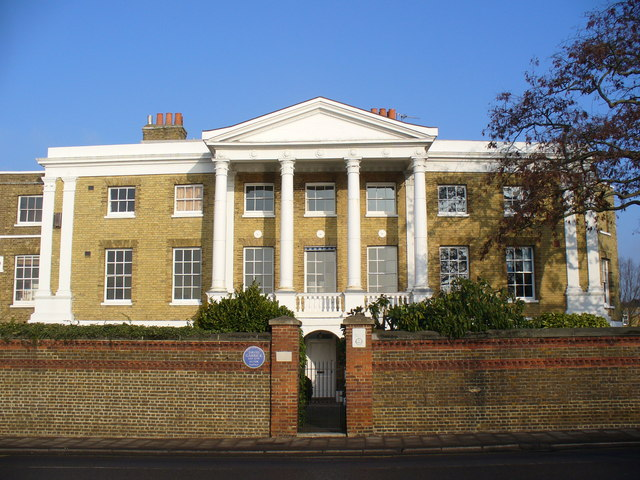

- Location within London Borough of Richmond upon Thames

General information
- Type: Country house
- Architectural style: Neoclassical architecture
- Location: Hampton Court Road, Hampton, Richmond upon Thames, London, England

Design and construction
- Architect: Robert Adam

Listed Building – Grade I
- Official name: Garrick's Villa
- Designated: 2 September 1952
- Reference no.: 1193477

Garrick's Villa is a Grade I listed country house located on Hampton Court Road in Hampton in the London Borough of Richmond upon Thames. Its park and gardens are listed at Grade II by Historic England in the Register of Historic Parks and Gardens of special historic interest in England.

The house was originally constructed in the Middle Ages. The country house was initially listed as Hampton House prior to its acquisition by the actor and theatre manager David Garrick (1717–1779) in about 1754. Numerous alterations were made to it during Garrick's tenure by the neoclassical architect Robert Adam (1728–1792), including the portico, the building of an orangery and the construction of a tunnel under the road to connect with his riverside lawn. A wing was added to the west side of the house in 1864.

In the late 19th century, the house belonged first to the preacher John Chippendall Montesquieu Bellew (1823–1874) and then to his son, the actor Kyrle Bellew (1850–1911).

During the early part of the 20th century the house was the family home of Sir (James) Clifton Robinson (1848–1910), Managing Director and Chief Engineer of London United Tramways, and a single private tram track leading into the grounds was constructed. The house was converted into flats in 1922 and redeveloped again in 1969.

On 25 October 2008, during building works on the house, a fire broke out and was brought under control five hours later.
