= Ait =

Small river islands (British English)

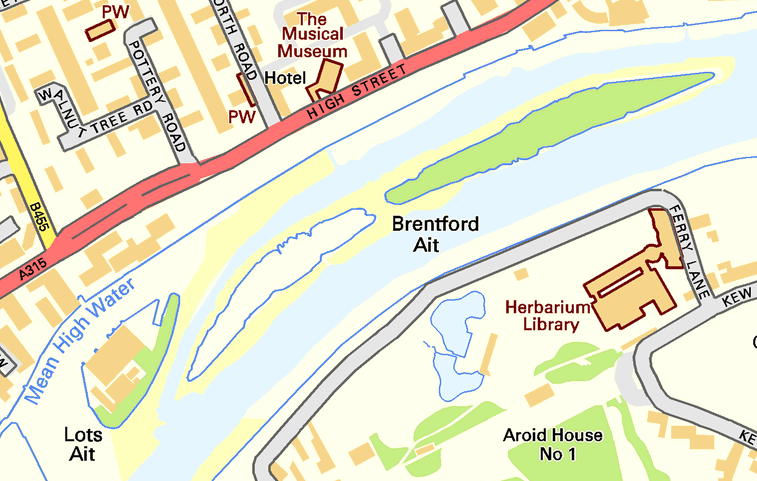
Aits on the River Thames

An ait (/eɪt/, like eight) or eyot (/aɪ(ə)t, eɪt/) is a small island. The term is especially used to refer to river islands found on the River Thames and its tributaries in England.

Aits are typically formed by the deposit of sediment in the water, which accumulates. An ait is characteristically long and narrow, and may become a permanent island should it become secured and protected by growing vegetation. However, aits may also be eroded: the resulting sediment is deposited further downstream and could result in another ait. A channel with numerous aits is called a braided channel.

== Etymology ==
The word derives from Old English iggath (or igeth); the root of the word, ieg, meaning island, with a diminutive suffix.

== References in literature ==
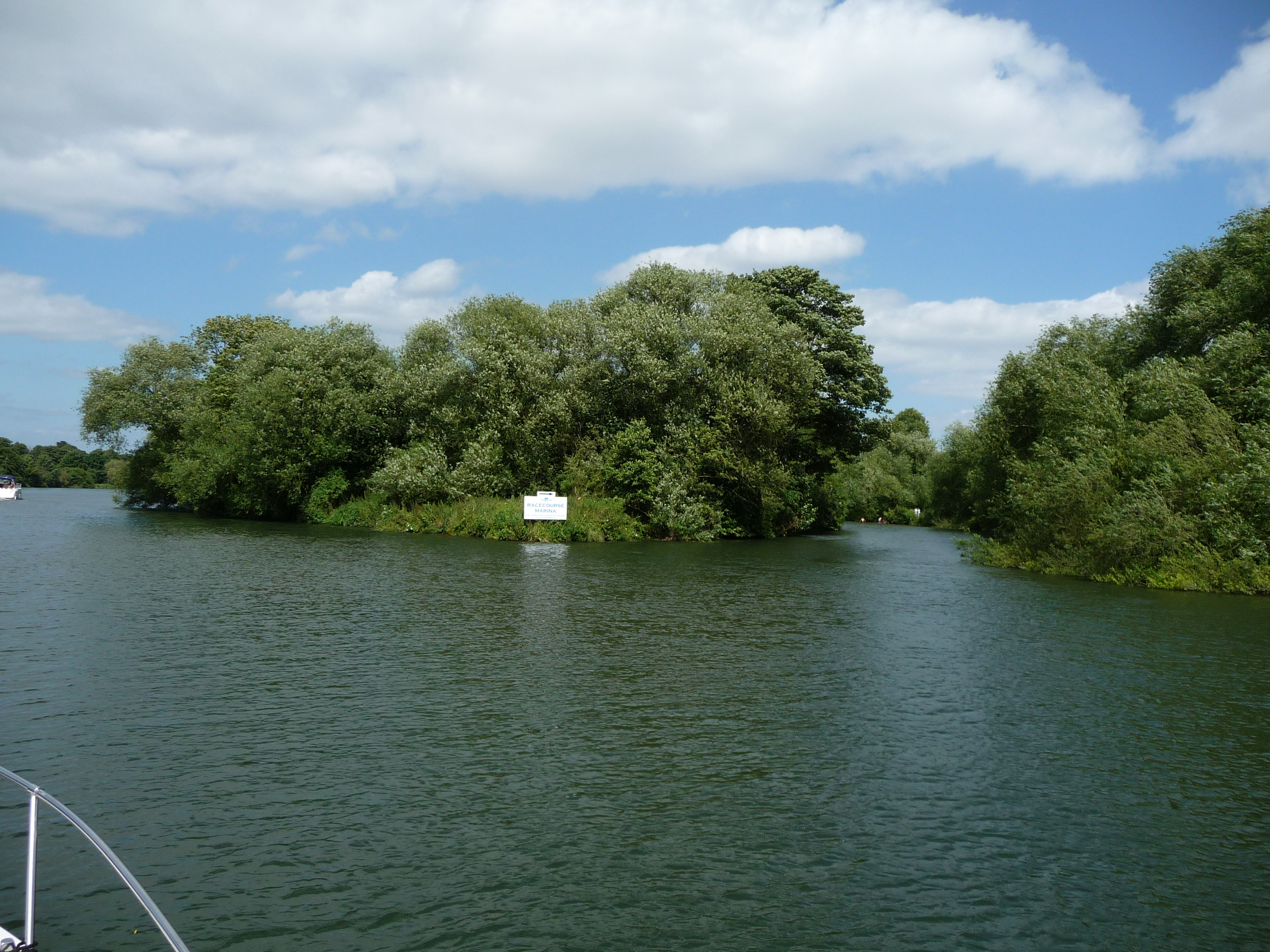
Bush Ait on the River Thames in Berkshire. Growing trees and other plants have secured the material that makes up the ait, protecting it from erosion.

Although not common in 21st-century English, "ait" or "eyot" appears in J. R. R. Tolkien's The Lord of the Rings, Charles Dickens's Bleak House, and Thackeray's Vanity Fair.

Joyce Cary used "eyot" in The Horse's Mouth – "Sun was in the bank. Streak of salmon below. Salmon trout above soaking into wash blue. River whirling along so fast that its skin was pulled into wrinkles like silk dragged over the floor. Shot silk. Fresh breeze off the eyot. Sharp as spring frost. Ruffling under the silk-like muscles in a nervous horse. Ruffling under my grief like ice and hot daggers".

More recently, "eyot" was used by Terry Pratchett in the first of the Discworld books, The Colour of Magic. It also appears in The Pope's Rhinoceros by Lawrence Norfolk.

William Horwood used it in his 1995 novel Toad Triumphant.

== See also ==
- Braid bar – depositional landform in a river which splits a channel
- Islands in the River Thames
- Shoal – natural submerged sandbank that rises from a body of water to near the surface
- River island – exposed landmass within a river
