= Yachtmaster =

Certificate of sailing competence

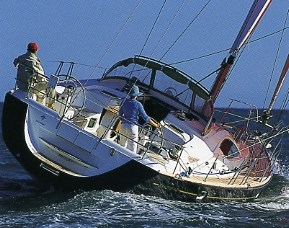
Modern Sailing Yacht

A Yachtmaster qualification is a certificate of competence of the ability to handle either a sailing boat or motor boat (as endorsed) in certain prescribed conditions. Three different titles are specified; Yachtmaster Coastal (previously - and in some countries still - called Coastal Skipper), Yachtmaster Offshore, and Yachtmaster Ocean which specify the level of competence required and the area of operation certified.

Certification may be sought for commercial recognition or as a confirmation of attainment of skills. The RYA Yachtmaster Coastal/Offshore qualification is widely accepted as part of the studies required for more advanced professional qualifications such as Officer of the Watch and Master 200.

The original training scheme and certification was established and is maintained by the Royal Yachting Association (RYA) in the UK and training to this scheme is carried out in many countries. Other countries such as Australia, have modified the scheme in partnership with the RYA so that it can be locally administered and operated by Yachting Australia.

== Training ==
The RYA set up a committee to govern its training activities in 1967 and the Yachtmaster Qualifications Panel was set up in 1971. Training is carried out in 58 countries and there are in excess of 25,000 RYA instructors across the world, (although many of these Instructors are not Yachtmaster Instructors but instruct in other disciplines (such as dinghy sailing, windsurfing and power-boating). More than 25,000 professionals are working on commercial vessels using RYA Certificates of Competence across 21 maritime flag states.

== Certificates of Competence ==
On behalf of the Maritime and Coastguard Agency (MCA), the RYA administers the Yachtmaster Scheme, examines candidates and issues Certificates of Competence. RYA/MCA Certificates of Competence are recognised and respected worldwide.

== RYA/MCA Yachtmaster Coastal Certificate of Competence ==
With effect from 1 January 2010 the former "Coastal Skipper" qualification has been re-designated as "Yachtmaster Coastal".

The Yachtmaster Coastal has the knowledge needed to skipper a yacht on coastal cruises no more than 60 nautical miles offshore in favourable conditions but does not necessarily have the experience needed to undertake longer passages.

=== Pre-Requisites ===
To take the practical examination, candidates must be aged 17 years or over and require:

1. Radio Operator's Qualification - A Restricted (VHF only) Radio Operator's Certificate or a GMDSS Short Range Certificate or higher grade of marine radio certificate.
2. First Aid - A valid First Aid Certificate from the RYA or by Police, Fire and Armed Services.
3. Minimum seatime - Candidates must have logged at least 30 days, 2 days as skipper, 800 nautical miles and 12 night hours. For candidates who hold the Certificate of Satisfactory Completion of the RYA/MCA Coastal Skipper Practical Course this is reduced to 20 days, 2 days as skipper, 400 nautical miles and 12 night hours. Half the qualifying sea time must be conducted in tidal waters.

=== Exam ===
The examination for Yachtmaster Coastal is practical and can be taken under sail or power and the certificate will be endorsed accordingly. It lasts 6–10 hours for one candidate or 8–14 hours for two candidates, and is conducted in a boat between 7 and 24 m (23 and 79 ft) in length.

The examination will include an assessment of the candidate's skippering skills, boat handling, general seamanship, navigation, safety awareness and knowledge of the IRPCS (collision regulations), meteorology, and signals. Candidates will be set tasks to demonstrate their ability as skipper and may also be asked questions on any part of the RYA syllabus for all practical and shorebased courses up to Yachtmaster Coastal level.

=== Commercial endorsement ===
The Yachtmaster Coastal Certificate of Competence can, subject to an ENG 1 or ML5 medical fitness test, be given a standard commercial endorsement that allows the holder to work on board British flagged vessels subject to the MCA's codes of practice for small commercial vessels up to 24 metres (79 ft) in length, operating in category 3, 4, 5 and 6 waters - that is up to 20 nautical miles from a safe haven. Additional requirements are completion of: (i) the RYA Basic Sea Survival course, or STCW Personal Survival Techniques; and (ii) the RYA Professional Practices and Responsibilities course.

== RYA/MCA Yachtmaster Offshore Certificate of Competence ==
The Yachtmaster Offshore is competent to skipper a cruising yacht on any passage during which the yacht is no more than 150 nautical miles from harbour.

=== Pre-Requisites ===
To take the practical examination, candidates must be aged 18 years or over and require:

1. Radio Operator's Qualification - A Restricted (VHF only) Radio Operator's Certificate or a GMDSS Short Range Certificate or higher grade of marine radio certificate.
2. First Aid - A valid First Aid Certificate from the RYA or by Police, Fire and Armed Services.
3. Minimum seatime - Candidates must have logged at least 50 days, 5 days as skipper, 2,500 nautical miles, including at least 5 passages over 60 nautical miles acting as skipper for at least two of these passages and two should involve overnight passages. Half the qualifying seamiles must have been conducted in tidal waters, and all qualifying sea miles must be within 10 years prior to the exam.

=== Exam ===
The examination for Yachtmaster Offshore is practical and can be taken under sail or power and the certificate will be endorsed accordingly. It lasts 8–12 hours for 1 candidate or 10–18 hours for 2 candidates, and is conducted in a boat between 7 and 24 m (23 and 79 ft) in length.

The examination involves a demonstration of skippering skills, boat handling, general seamanship, navigation, safety awareness and knowledge of ship construction, ballasting, radio, radar, collision regulations, meteorology and signals. Candidates will be set tasks to demonstrate their ability as skipper and may also be asked questions on any part of the RYA syllabus for all practical and shorebased courses except Yachtmaster Ocean.

=== Commercial endorsement ===
Standard commercial endorsement

The Yachtmaster Offshore Certificate of Competence can, subject to an ML5 medical fitness test, be given a standard commercial endorsement which allows the holder to work as a Master on board vessels sailing under the British flag subject to the MCA's codes of practice for small commercial vessels of up to 200gt in category 1 to 6 waters - that is up to 150 miles from a safe haven, or Master Category 5 operating up to 200 nautical miles offshore, depending upon country. Additional requirements are completion of: (i) the RYA Basic Sea Survival course, or STCW Personal Survival Techniques; and (ii) the RYA Professional Practices and Responsibilities course.

STCW endorsement

The Yachtmaster Offshore Certificate of Competence can subject to an ENG 1 medical fitness test and four additional courses

- Personal Survival techniques (RYA Basic Sea Survival certificate or STCW A-V1/1-1)
- Personal Safety and Social Responsibilities (STCW A-V1/1-4)
- Elementary first aid (STCW A-V1/1-3)
- Fire fighting and fire prevention (STCW A-V1/1-2)

be given the STCW endorsement that allows the holder to work under non-UK maritime authorities.

== RYA/MCA Yachtmaster Ocean Certificate of Competence ==
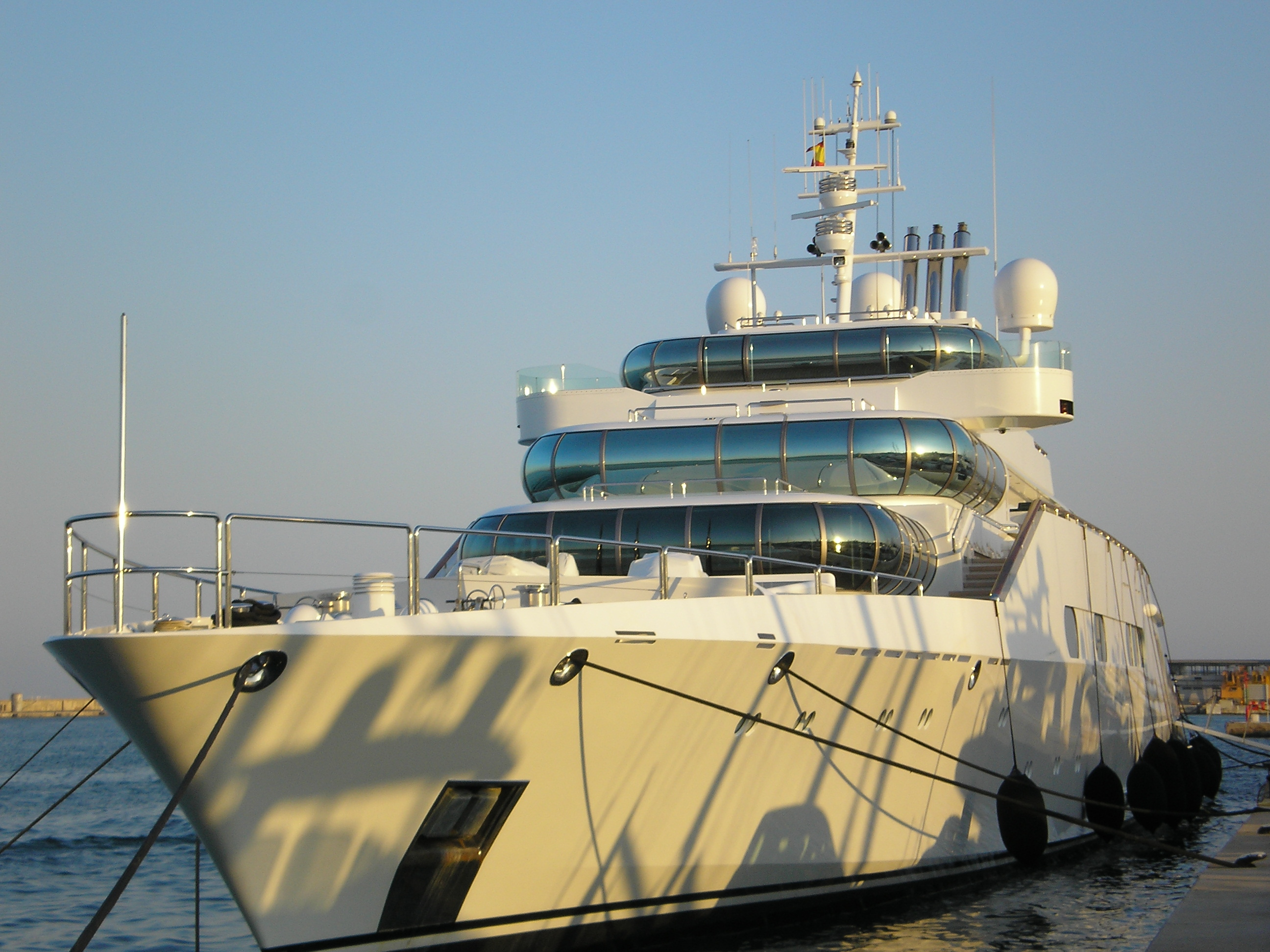
Super Motoryacht in Palma de Mallorca

The Yachtmaster Ocean is competent to skipper a yacht on passages of any length in all parts of the world.

=== Pre-Requisites ===
To take the examination, candidates are required to:

1. Previous certification - Hold an RYA/MCA Yachtmaster Offshore Certificate of Competence.
2. Minimum seatime - Have completed, as skipper or mate of watch, a qualifying ocean passage. The candidate must have been fully involved in the planning of the passage, including selection of the route, the navigational plan, checking the material condition of the yacht and her equipment, storing spare gear, water and victuals and organising the watch-keeping routine. A minimum non-stop distance of 600 nautical miles must have been run by the log, the yacht must have been at sea continuously for 96 hours, and the yacht must have been more than 50 nautical miles from land while sailing a distance of at least 200 nautical miles. All qualifying seatime must be within 10 years prior to the exam.

Due to the level of competence required, the Yachtmaster Ocean exam is a comprehensive test of a skipper's ability.

=== Exam ===
The Yachtmaster Ocean examination consists of an oral and a written test of the candidate's knowledge of ocean passage making including planning, navigation, worldwide meteorology, crew management, yacht preparation, maintenance and repairs. The candidate will also be questioned on the sights taken at sea during an ocean passage.

Oral - The candidate must provide the examiner with an account of the planning and execution of the qualifying passage. He/she must also provide navigational records showing that he/she navigated the yacht without the use of electronic navigational aids. The records must include as a bare minimum: planning, reduction and plotting of a sun run meridian altitude sight, and a compass check carried out using the bearing of the sun, moon, a star or planet.

During the oral test the candidate may be required to answer questions on all aspects of ocean passage making in a yacht, including passage planning, astro navigation, worldwide meteorology, crew management, yacht preparation, maintenance and repairs.

Written - The written examination includes questions on sights and sight reduction and worldwide meteorology. Candidates who hold the Certificate of Satisfactory Completion of the RYA/MCA Yachtmaster Ocean Shorebased Course, a Royal Navy Ocean Navigation Certificate or an MCA Certificate of Competence as a Deck Officer are exempt from the written examination.

=== Commercial endorsement ===
Standard commercial endorsement

The Yachtmaster Ocean Certificate of Competence can, subject to an ENG 1 medical fitness test, be given a standard commercial endorsement that allows the holder to work as a Master on board British flagged vessels subject to the MCA's codes of practice for small commercial vessels of up to 200gt in all waters around the world with no legal restrictions on how far he may sail from land. This is known as an unrestricted, worldwide certificate. Additional requirements are completion of: (i) the RYA Basic Sea Survival course, or STCW Personal Survival Techniques; and (ii) the RYA Professional Practices and Responsibilities course.

STCW endorsement

If commercially endorsed, the Yachtmaster Ocean Certificate of Competence can, subject to completion of four additional courses listed below, be given the STCW endorsement that allows the holder to work under non-UK maritime authorities:

- Personal Survival techniques (RYA Basic Sea Survival certificate or STCW A-V1/1-1)
- Personal Safety and Social Responsibilities (STCW A-V1/1-4)
- Elementary first aid (STCW A-V1/1-3)
- Fire fighting and fire prevention (STCW A-V1/1-2)

The RYA Yachtmaster Ocean Certificate of Competence can be used commercially in its own right, but is also a pre-requisite for the MCA's Master 200, Chief Mate, Master 500 and Master 3000 qualifications.

== Yachtmaster of the Year ==
The RYA Yachtmaster of the Year award is a prestigious annual honor bestowed by the Royal Yachting Association upon an outstanding sailor who has demonstrated exceptional skill, knowledge, and competence during their Yachtmaster examination. The winner is selected by RYA examiners from over 3,000 candidates and receives the RYA Yachtmaster Trophy at the luncheon at Trinity House.

This award recognizes the best candidate of the year. It is usually given to someone who has demonstrated exceptional sailing, navigation, and, above all, outstanding skippering skills under pressure and often in challenging conditions. Winners receive the RYA Yachtmaster Trophy, which was originally established by the Royal Institute of Navigation.

Nominations are submitted exclusively by the worldwide team of RYA Yachtmaster examiners and are not accepted through public applications. The trophy is often awarded to individuals who have distinguished themselves in their training or profession, for example, in the merchant marine or the armed forces.

The award ceremony, which is usually attended by high-ranking dignitaries such as Her Royal Highness Princess Anne, helps to enhance the reputation of the RYA's training standards. The award serves to showcase top talent in watersports and encourage others to pursue high-level certification.

The first ever awarded (in 2002) was Nick Bubb, the first female awarded (in 2016) was Zara Roberts and the first Non-Brit awarded (in 2012) was Rainer Holtoff.

== See also ==
- International Certificates for Operators of Pleasure Crafts
- International Certificate of Competence
- Competent Crew
- Day Skipper
- Coastal Skipper
