= Autonomous and Remote Navigation Trial Project =

A-Navigation Trial Project

Autonomous and Remote Navigation Trial Project (ARNTP, a-Navigation Trial Project) is the trial of maritime autonomous surface ships (MASS) in commercial operations hold within 2020 in three different sea water areas of Russia.

Dedicated to the trial, three ships belonging to three shipping companies were duly fitted with the required technological equipment, the proper Remote Control Centres were installed by the involved shipping companies. The trial was supported by the federal authorities of Russia who considered and approved necessary legal requirements and rules for the project to follow.

The results of the project proved the effectiveness of the technologies used and initiated the nationwide experiment on use of autonomous ships under the Russian flag by any shipping company.

== Mission ==
The project aimed to establish technical and legal conditions for the wide operation of Maritime Autonomous Surface Ship (MASS). The following goals were settled for the project:

- to develop legislation adopting autonomous navigation (a-Navigation) to the current maritime law, in compliance with the current conventional regulation and safety requirements;
- to install set of technical systems enabling a-Navigation to several vessels of different types;
- to test the installed technical systems at ships operating in real commercial conditions;
- to provide risk assessment;
- to prove safety and efficiency of a-Navigation;
- to prove the offered set of technical systems enable a-Navigation for existing ships.

== Milestones ==
The project was initially announced in November 2018 by Alexander Pinskiy, the project author, during the Transport Week Forum in Russia. It was supported by the Ministry of Industry and Trade and by the Ministry of Transport.

On 30 January 2019, to implement the announced trial on a-Navigation, a group of the Russian shipping companies, technology companies, and maritime institutes have established the joint working group under the umbrella of Industry Association MARINET.

The group involved Rosmorport, SCF, Pola Group as shipping companies providing ships for the trial; Sitronics KT (general contractor and system integrator), Air and Marine Electronics, Russian Satellite Communications Company, SCANEX as a technology companies providing equipment, software, and communication channels; Research Institute of Special Projects, Gentral Research Institute KURS, Maritime State University named after admiral G.I. Nevelskoy, Admiral Makarov State University of Maritime and Inland Shipping, Peter the Great St. Petersburg Polytechnic University as maritime institutes providing proper investigation; and Russian Maritime Register of Shipping providing technical verification and assessment.

Within 2019, the system architecture, system prototypes, and the basic methodology titled as "the complete functional equivalence principle" were developed, tested, and passed risk assessment procedures.

In September 2019, Sitronics KT signed with the Ministry of Industry and Trade of the Russian Federation the 4,5 MUSD R&D contract "The unmanned navigation for merchant fleet" supporting the trial project.

By September 2020, the project team developed the proposals for national MASS regulation. Meanwhile, software solutions were tested ashore using simulators, experimental equipment was manufactured and installed onboard of four vessels under the supervision of the Russian Maritime Register of Shipping.

Within 2020, all three commercial vessels involved in the project were duly equipped. The first stage of the trail operation started in October 2020, it included collection of field data from experimental ships and analysis of systems operation. At that stage, the ships were controlled by crew on board only, without access of new systems to ships’ actuators.

Later on, the project was widely supported by the Agency for Strategic Initiatives. and high level authorities of Russia and received regulatory development. – On December 5, 2020, the Government Decree on Wide National Experiment on a-Navigation was approved.

In February 2021, Rosmorport unveiled the first video confirming the start of the second stage of the trial operation: use of automatic and remote control of ships in real conditions under the supervision of the crew. Later on, other videos of the trial operation of ships participating in the a-Navigation Trial Project were distributed.

At the beginning of 2020, Russia notified the International Maritime Organization (IMO) on holding the Autonomous Navigation Trial Project with the probation of the full range of autonomous navigation systems on several ships in real operation conditions. In March 2021 Russia reported to the IMO on ARNTP interim results (MSC 103/5/9) and development of the national MASS regulation (MSC 103/5/7, MSC 103/5/8).

In February 2022 Russia reported to the IMO on ARNTP results including details of 28 commercial voyages made in 2021 with use of remote and autonomous control (MSC 105/INF.12).

== Ships involved ==
POLA ANFISA, general cargo ship owned by Pola Rise, IMO: 9851115, MMSI: 273448220, home port; Saints Petersburg, project: RSD-59, currently operating in Caspian Sea and Black Sea.

RABOCHAYA, motor barge owned by Rosmorport, currently operating in Black Sea and Azov Sea together with REDUT dredger.

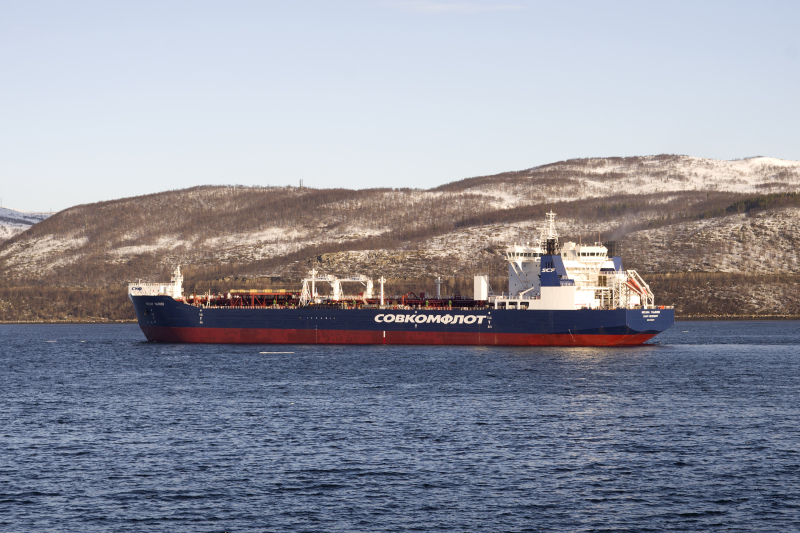
MIKHAIL ULYANOV, shuttle tanker owned by SCF, operating in Barents Sea

== Set of technical systems for a-Navigation ==
The a-Navigation (autonomous navigation) technology in its scheme uses not only new developments. It assumes the maximum use of existing technical and navigation systems on board, incl. mandatory ones. Thus, the widely used Unattended Machinery Spaces equipment, which does not require the constant presence of the crew in engine rooms and mandatory equipment on board are integrated in a single complex with the key a-Navigation systems

The system architecture is introduced at the picture.

=== Autonomous Navigation System (ANS) ===
The ANS performs the functions of automatic analysis of the environment, the passage along a given route (in automatic mode and remote control mode), offering automatic decision-making on maneuvering, while taking into account the parameters of the vessel and International Regulations for Preventing Collisions at Sea (COLREGs) provisions. The ANS includes Sensor Fusion Module (SFM), Automatic Collision Avoidance Module (ACAM), and ANS Client (representing an extended functionality of Electronic Chart Display and Information System (ECDIS).

The system architecture

The Sensor Fusion Module (SFM) integrates, synchronizes, and validates navigational data from various sources such as the radar, AIS, positioning, compass, weather station, etc., and the optical system. This is similar to an officer onboard who has to gather data from all of these navigational devices by his eyes and integrate them into a single picture in his mind.

The Automatic Collision Avoidance Module (ACAM) keeps to the route and calculates the maneuvers of the vessel to avoid collisions with other vessels and navigational hazards in accordance with rules determined by COLREGs. These detailed rules are provided as per clear official recommendations from the Russian Federal Agency for Maritime and River Transport for automatic collision avoidance systems. Strictly determined algorithms of this nature make MASS 100% predictable, even in comparison with a traditionally crewed ship.

The ANS Client integrates all the data from mandatory and additional electronic charts (such as ICE or SAT images) as well as any other available information and presents it via human interfaces that are similar to ECDIS.

=== Optical Surveillance and Analysis System (OSA) ===
The OSA is an optical system that detects and recognizes surrounding objects. It transmits this data in a machine-readable form to the ANS while also sending the processed video image to human interfaces (such as the Remote Control Station).

The OSA fulfills visual observation requirements in a completely autonomous mode while sitting in parallel to human-operated remote mode, which improves the situational awareness of the crew, both on board and in the RCS. Augmented Reality and even completely virtual models (in case of poor visibility or problems with the communication channel between the remote control and the vessel) may well become common everyday tools of navigators in the near future.

=== Remote Control Station (RCS) ===
The RCS is a workstation for a remote control operator and is designed to solve the entire range of remote monitoring and control tasks. It is located outside the controlled vessel and is the equivalent of a highly ergonomic ship's bridge and a central control station.

Also, the a-Navigation technological complex involves the use of such systems as:

=== Coordinated Motion Control System (CMS) ===
The CMS transmits ANS commands to the ship actuators. It, thus, performs the same functions as the helmsman who converts the officer's orders to actions regarding steering and engine control.

The existing ship heading or a trajectory control system are used as CMS in the a-Navigation complex. Currently CMS allows support through human control or follows a given trajectory with high accuracy while taking into account existing weather conditions and the ship model. Connection of CMS to ANS allows control of propulsion and steering systems, both automatically and remotely.

=== Communication systems ===
All a-Navigation systems are combined into one local area network, including a VPN tunnel between onboard systems and the Remote Control Station. This local network is protected from an unauthorized access using data encryption, a firewall to protect the perimeter, and controls and restricts sockets.

The data exchange between the onboard network segment and the remote systems is carried out by wireless communication channels. Depending on the MASS operation conditions, communication facilities may include:

- satellite communications (in any waters): VSAT, Inmarsat, Iridium, etc.;

- mobile communications (within the coverage area of mobile networks): CDMA, 3G, 4G;

- direct radio link (in the line of sight, for example, during Convoy Navigation).

=== Internal CCTV ===
Internal CCTV provides various tasks like indoor video recording, automatic control over the condition of rooms (movement, change of geometric parameters, etc.), equipment (change of indication, switch states, etc.), cargo (displacement, crumbling, tilt and other parameters), and the transmission of this video information to the Remote Control Station.

== Regulation development ==
In accordance with a-Navigation approach, to ensure the widespread use of MASS in real conditions, they must fully enforce the implementation of all existing management functions provided for by the current international regulation for the ship's crew. This will ensure, on the one hand, the uniformity of regulation in relation to the global fleet, and on the other hand, guarantee that MASS, when interacting with other actors, will be guided by and perform well-known and mandatory functions.

The principle of Complete Functional Equivalence presupposes the full performance of all functions prescribed for the crew on board by current safety regulation (SOLAS, COLREGs, STCW), regardless of control methods, including through the use of automatic and remote control.

Based on this approach the project participants have developed several legal documents:

- Federal Law "On Amendments to the Merchant Shipping Code of the Russian Federation and certain legislative acts in terms of legal relations arising from the operation of autonomous ships" prepared by the Ministry of Industry and Trade together with Industry Association MARINET.
- Decree by the Russian government approved the national experiment on a wide MASS trial operation, allowing any shipping company to equip its ship under the Russian flag with autonomous navigation systems and to use it in its regular activity
- Recommendation on COLREGs application for autonomous navigation issued by the Federal Agency on Maritime and River Transportation of the Russian Federation.
- Rules for MASS classification issued by the Russian Maritime Register of Shipping

In December 2020, the Russian Maritime Register of Shipping issued the Approval in Principle for the complex of a-Navigation systems
