= List of certificates for operators of pleasure craft =

This article contains information about licences to operate pleasure craft. For the international licence also known as ICC, see International Certificate of Competence.

== Europe ==
State	Inland waters	Close coastal waters	Close offshore	Extended offshore	Offshore	ICC included
Germany	Sportbootführerschein Binnen valid on inland waters	Sportbootführerschein See valid for offshore up to 3 miles and the channels marked by lateral marks up to 12 miles from the coast	Sportküstenschifferschein valid for offshore up to 12 miles	Sportseeschifferschein valid for offshore up to 30 miles and North Sea, Baltic Sea, Mediterranean Sea, Black Sea and English Channel, Bristol Channel, Irish Sea, Scottisch Seas	Sporthochseeschifferschein valid for offshore	yes
Austria	Schiffsführerpatent	Befähigungsausweis für Tages- und Wattfahrt valid for offshore up to 3 miles	Befähigungsausweis für Küstenfahrt valid for offshore up to 20 miles	Befähigungsausweis für Küstennahe Fahrt valid for offshore up to 200 miles	Befähigungsausweis für Weltweite Fahrt valid for offshore	yes
Spain	Licencia de Navegación: Sailable Distance: Up to 2 nm from a port or place of shelter.; Boat Length: Up to 6 meters.; Water Scooter: Up to Type C.; Navigation Time: Daylight only.	Patrón de Navegación Básica: Sailable Distance: Up to 5 nm from a port or place of shelter.; Boat Length: Up to 8 meters.; Water Scooter: No limit.; Navigation Time: No limit.	Patron de Embarcaciones de Recreo: Sailable Distance: Up to 12 nm from the coast.; Expandable for navigation to the Balearic Islands.; Boat Length: Up to 15 meters.; Expandable up to 24 meters.; Water Scooter: No limit.; Navigation Time: No limit.	Patrón de Yate: Sailable Distance: Up to 150 nm from the coast.; Boat Length: Up to 24 meters.; Water Scooter: No limit.; Navigation Time: No limit.	Capitán de Yate: Sailable Distance: No limit.; Boat Length: Up to 24 meters.; Water Scooter: No limit.; Navigation Time: No limit.	?
Switzerland	Schiffsführerausweis [Schiffsführerausweis] valid for inland waters				Hochseeausweis [Schiffsführerausweis] valid for Offshore	yes
United Kingdom	Boat Masters License (BML)	Day Skipper valid for Coastal Waters during daylight	Yachtmaster Coastal valid for Coastal Waters	Yachtmaster Offshore valid for Offshore up to 150 miles	Yachtmaster Ocean valid for offshore	yes
Israel			Grade 30 Authorization to operate a boat in coastal waters valid for coastal waters		Grade 60 Authorization to operade a boat on international voyages valid for offshore	no
Netherlands	Klein Vaarbewijs I valid for LOA > 15m max.25m or speed > 15 km/h valid for channels and lakes except IJsselmeer, Markermeer, IJmeer, Waddenzee, Westerschelde, Oosterschelde, Eems and Dollard Klein Vaarbewijs II valid for LOA > 15m max.25m or speed > 15 km/h valid on all inland waters including IJsselmeer, Markermeer, IJmeer, Waddenzee, Westerschelde, Oosterschelde, Eems and Dollard GPb (Grootpleziersvaarbewijs) valid for LOA max.40m	International Certificate for Operators of Pleasure Craft issued by CBR ICC Klein Vaarbewijs II LOA >15m max. 25m or speed > 15 km/h valid for offshore up to 3 miles ICC GPb(Grootpleziersvaarbewijs) valid for LOA max.40m	International Certificate for Operators of Pleasure Craft issued by CBR ICC Klein Vaarbewijs II LOA >15m max. 25m or speed > 15 km/h valid for coastal waters offshore up to 12 miles (territorial zone) ICC GPb(Grootpleziersvaarbewijs) valid for LOA max.40m	To sail the Contiguous and the coastal Exclusive Economic zone an ICC certificate is not obligatory although comprehensive knowledge is strongly recommended	To sail the International waters (outside territorial waters) an ICC certificate is not obligatory although extensive experience is strongly recommended	yes
Czech Republic	Vůdce malého plavidla (Small Boat Skipper)	Mezinárodní průkaz vůdce malého plavidla (International Small Boat Skipper) limits: within 3/4 mile from coastal line, wind below 4 bf, LOA < 20m	Yachtmaster grade C limits: within 20 miles from coastal line, wind below 6 bf, LOA < 16m	Yachtmaster grade B limits: within 200 miles from coastal line	Yachtmaster grade A unlimited	
Romania	International Certificate for Operators of Pleasure Craft Class D valid for: I - Inland waterways; M - Motorized crafts; S - Sailing crafts.; Pleasure craft not exceeding 24 m in length.	International Certificate for Operators of Pleasure Craft Class C valid for: C - Coastal waters up to 6 Nm; M - Motorized crafts; S - Sailing crafts.; Pleasure craft not exceeding 24 m in length.	International Certificate for Operators of Pleasure Craft Class B valid for: M24 - Maritime waters up to 24 Nm; M - Motorized crafts; S - Sailing crafts.; Pleasure craft not exceeding 24 m in length.		International Certificate for Operators of Pleasure Craft Class A valid for: All Zones - unlimited; M - Motorized crafts; S - Sailing crafts.; Pleasure craft not exceeding 24 m in length.	yes
Russia	Удостоверение на право управления маломерным судном / Certificate for operators of small craft [Категории_транспортных_средств#Удостоверение_(права)_на_управление_водным_транспортом] Certificate is issued by subdivisions of the State Small Vessels Inspectorate of the Ministry of Emergency Situations if there is the mark "внутренние воды" in the certificate - it's valid on inland waters without organized navigation if there is the mark "внутренние водные пути" in the certificate - it's valid on inland waterways (inland waters with organized navigation) and inland waters without organized navigation Categories (types of small crafts): personal watercraft (water scooter); motorized craft (motorboat with inboard or outboard engine); sailing boat; motor-sailing boat; hovercraft; special craft (airboat, submarine, wing-in-surface-effect ship and others); Small craft should not exceeding 20 meters in length (regardless of the type). [Маломерное_судно]	Удостоверение на право управления маломерным судном / Certificate for operators of small craft Certificate is issued by subdivisions of the State Small Vessels Inspectorate of the Ministry of Emergency Situations if there is the mark "внутренние морские воды и территориальное море" in the certificate - it's valid on internal maritime waters and territorial sea (limits: within 12 nautical miles from coastal line) Categories (types of small crafts): personal watercraft (water scooter); motorized craft (motorboat with inboard or outboard engine); sailing boat; motor-sailing boat; hovercraft; special craft (airboat, submarine, wing-in-surface-effect ship and others); Small craft should not exceeding 20 meters in length (regardless of the type).	Удостоверение на право управления маломерным судном / Certificate for operators of small craft Certificate is issued by subdivisions of the State Small Vessels Inspectorate of the Ministry of Emergency Situations if there is the mark "внутренние морские воды и территориальное море" in the certificate - it's valid on internal maritime waters and territorial sea (limits: within 12 nautical miles from coastal line) Categories (types of small crafts): personal watercraft (water scooter); motorized craft (motorboat with inboard or outboard engine); sailing boat; motor-sailing boat; hovercraft; special craft (airboat, submarine, wing-in-surface-effect ship and others); Small craft should not exceeding 20 meters in length (regardless of the type).	Удостоверение на право управления маломерным судном / Certificate for operators of small craft Certificate is issued by subdivisions of the State Small Vessels Inspectorate of the Ministry of Emergency Situations if there is the mark "морские воды IV категории сложности I разряда" in the certificate - it's valid on marine coastal waters (limits: within 20 nautical miles from coastal line) Categories (types of small crafts): personal watercraft (water scooter); motorized craft (motorboat with inboard or outboard engine); sailing boat; motor-sailing boat; hovercraft; special craft (airboat, submarine, wing-in-surface-effect ship and others); Small craft should not exceeding 20 meters in length (regardless of the type). The sailing in marine waters over 20 nautical miles from coastal line requires the professional certificate.	The sailing in marine waters over 20 nautical miles from coastal line requires the professional certificate.	no
Hungary	Nemzetközi kedvtelési célú hajóvezetői bizonyítvány (International Certificate for Operators of Pleasure Craft) Inland valid for: I - Inland waterways; M - Motorized crafts; S - Sailing crafts.; Pleasure craft not exceeding 20 m in length.	Nemzetközi kedvtelési célú hajóvezetői bizonyítvány (International Certificate for Operators of Pleasure Craft) Class IV: 3 nm from coastal line valid for: C - Coastal waters; M - Motorized crafts; S - Sailing crafts.; Pleasure craft not exceeding 20 m in length.	Nemzetközi kedvtelési célú hajóvezetői bizonyítvány (International Certificate for Operators of Pleasure Craft) Class III: 12 nm from coastal line valid for: C - Coastal waters; M - Motorized crafts; S - Sailing crafts.; Pleasure craft not exceeding 20 m in length.	Nemzetközi kedvtelési célú hajóvezetői bizonyítvány (International Certificate for Operators of Pleasure Craft) Class II: 200 nm from coastal line Pleasure craft not exceeding 20 m in length.	Nemzetközi kedvtelési célú hajóvezetői bizonyítvány (International Certificate for Operators of Pleasure Craft) Class I: unlimited Pleasure craft not exceeding 20 m in length.	yes
Canada	Pleasure Craft Operator Card (PCOC) Valid for operating all recreational motorized vessels in Canada. No limit to the pleasure craft size or power that can be operated with the Canadian PCOC. Can be obtained online from a Transport Canada accredited Pleasure Craft Operator Card provider.	No limit to pleasure craft size or distance from shore.	No limit to pleasure craft size or distance from shore.	No limit to pleasure craft size or distance from shore.	No limit to pleasure craft size or distance from shore.	no

== Asia ==
- India

=== East Asia ===
Non ICC included

- China：
  - Yacht Driving License
    - A1F - All
    - A1E - Motor only
    - A2F - All, length of 20 metres and below
    - A2E: Motor only, length of below 20 metres
    - B1F - All, only in navigable water area of inland river
    - B1E - Motor only, only in navigable water area of inland river
    - B2F - All, only in enclosed water area of inland river
    - B2E - Motor only, only in enclosed water area of inland river
- Hong Kong：
  - Pleasure Vessel Operator Certificate of Competence
- Macau：
  - Pleasure Boat Driver License
