= Autonomous cargo ship =

Crewless vehicles that transport cargo

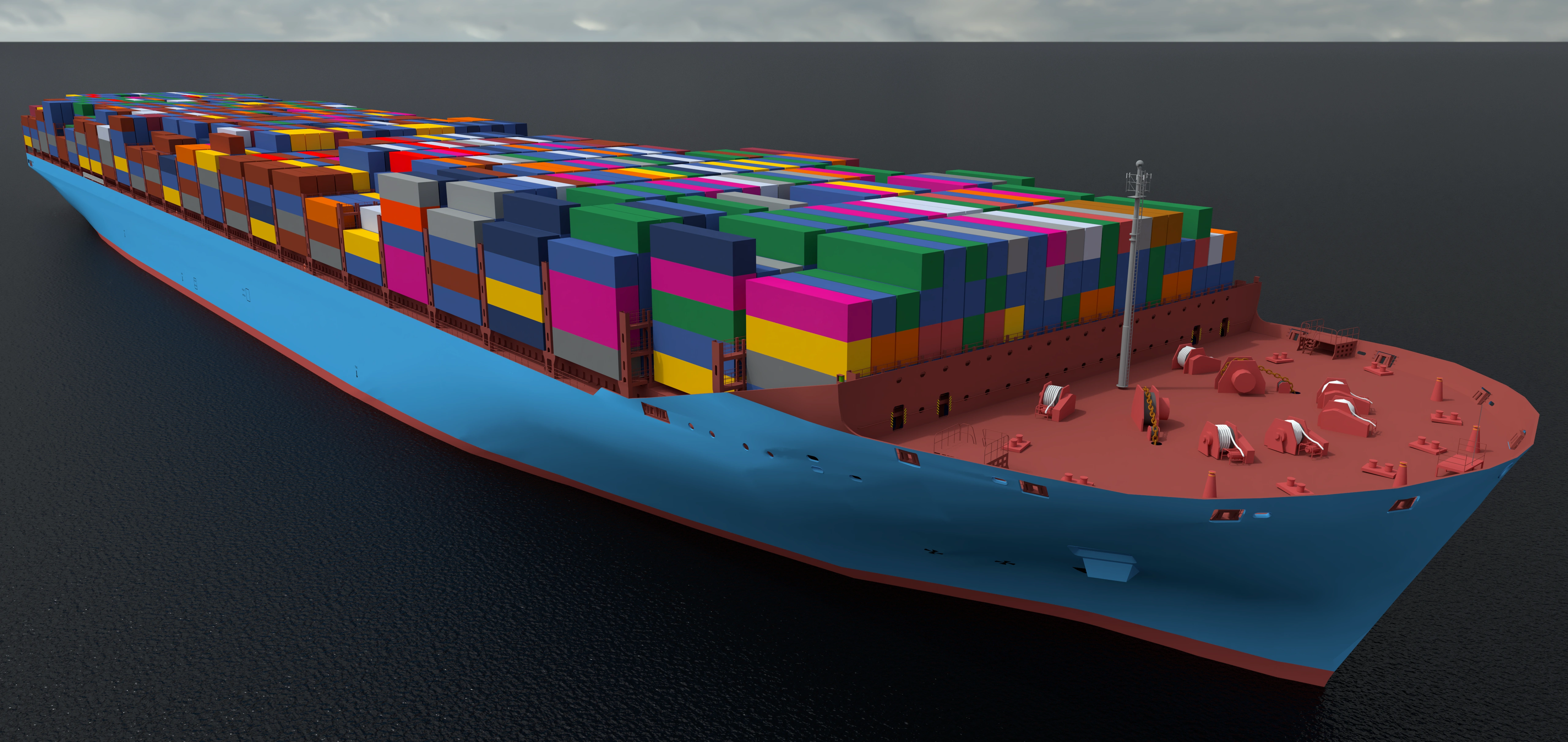
3D design of an autonomous container ship with no superstructure or smoke stacks

Autonomous cargo ships, also known as autonomous container ships or maritime autonomous surface ships (MASS), are crewless vessels that transport either containers or bulk cargo over navigable waters with little or no human interaction. Different methods and levels of autonomy can be achieved through monitoring and remote control from a nearby manned ship, an onshore control center or through artificial intelligence and machine learning, letting the vessel itself decide the course of action.

As of 2019, several autonomous cargo ship projects were in development, a prominent one being the construction of the MV Yara Birkeland, which was initially scheduled to enter trials in 2019 and operations in 2020. In Russia, a group of companies under the umbrella of Industry Association MARINET initiated the Autonomous and Remote Navigation Trial Project. Within the framework of the project, three existing ships were equipped to be controlled remotely and able to operate in remote mode when carrying out their actual commercial voyages. Shipping firms operating in the Great Lakes are also actively pursuing this technology in partnership with various marine technology firms.

As of 2020, Japan reported to the IMO on first MASS trial with the Iris Leader, pure car truck carrier. France reported on trials with "VN REBEL", the 80-meter-long merchant ship based in the Toulon harbour, which was remotely controlled from the Polytechnic School in the Paris region. China reported on trials conducted with the ship Jin Dou Yun 0 Hao, the 12.9-m vessel operated by automatic navigation technology and remote control, and powered from an electrical plant.

In 2021, Russian companies conducted trials of autonomous navigation systems during 28 commercial voyages. Due to promising results achieved, the maritime authorities of Russia have allowed any shipping company to equip its ships flying the flag of Russia with autonomous navigation systems and operate them in their regular activities as part of the national experiment, subject to some conditions.

Autonomous cargo ships are by some in the shipping industry viewed as the next logical step within maritime shipping, noting the general trend of automating tasks and reducing crews on ships. In 2016, Oskar Levander, Rolls-Royce's VP of Marine Innovation stated: "This is happening. It's not if, it's when. The technologies needed to make remote and autonomous ships a reality exist... We will see a remote controlled ship in commercial use by the end of the decade."

Others have remained more skeptical, such as the CEO of the largest shipping company in the world, Søren Skou from Maersk who remarked that he does not see the advantages of removing the already downsized crews from ships, adding: "I don’t expect we will be allowed to sail around with 400-meter long container ships, weighing 200,000 tonnes without any human beings on board […] I don't think it will be a driver of efficiency, not in my time." Regulatory, safety, legal and security challenges are viewed as the largest obstacles in making autonomous cargo ships a reality.

== Definition ==
The Maritime Safety Committee at the International Maritime Organization (IMO) has proposed a preliminary definition of autonomous ships as Maritime Autonomous Surface Ships (MASS) which includes the degrees of autonomy a ship can operate independently of human interaction:

- Degree one: Ship with automated processes and decision support: Seafarers are on board to operate and control shipboard systems and functions. Some operations may be automated and at times be unsupervised but with seafarers on board ready to take control.
- Degree two: Remotely controlled ship with seafarers on board: The ship is controlled and operated from another location. Seafarers are available on board to take control and to operate the shipboard systems and functions.
- Degree three: Remotely controlled ship without seafarers on board: The ship is controlled and operated from another location. There are no seafarers on board.
- Degree four: Fully autonomous ship: The operating system of the ship is able to make decisions and determine actions by itself.

== Concepts ==
Researchers from the University of Tromsø have proposed different concepts on how semi-autonomous and fully autonomous sailing might be organized.

Master-Slave System envisions that a single manned "master" ship is used to coordinate and supervise a cluster of non-manned autonomous "slave" ships that follows it. Personnel with traditional maritime, engineering, and ICT training will be present in order to deal with sudden events such as a communications breakdown, fire, or a search and rescue operation. The Captain on Land system envisions ships that can be monitored and navigated from a trained onshore crew at a command center. Audio-visual technology would aid the crew in gaining orientation of its surrounding. It would allow for the ship to be completely autonomous in low-traffic areas, but be controlled from the command center in high traffic areas such as the Suez Canal or Straits of Malacca. Fully autonomous operations would allow the ship to sail without any human interference, gathering information and data from its surroundings and enacting a decision based on it. It can also send and receive navigational and positional data from other autonomous ships similar to airborne collision avoidance system, allowing it to take safe action if needed.

The Industry Association MARINET introduced an approach based on Complete Functional Equivalence principle. The principle suggests that functions prescribed for onboard crew by current maritime regulation to be completely carried out automatically and under remote control. It allows gradual automation of the ship, automating functions one by one and in full extend.

== Technology ==
Autonomous ships achieve autonomy by the use of technologies similarly found in autonomous cars and autopilots. Sensors provide data with the help of infrared and visual spectrum cameras supplemented by radar, sonar, lidar, GPS and AIS which will be able to supply data for navigational use. Other data such as meteorological data and deep-sea navigation and traffic systems from onshore locations will help the vessel plot a safe course. The data would then be processed by artificial intelligence systems either on board the vessel itself or at an onshore location, proposing an optimal route and decision pattern.

The data from sensors listed above are processed by several systems, that is, autonomous navigation system, optical surveillance and analysis system, coordinated motion control system, engine controls, technical monitoring systems and human interfaces (remote control station and interfaces onboard).

== Potential benefits ==
=== Operational safety ===
A study by Allianz in 2018 estimated that between 75% and 96% of maritime-related accidents are caused by human error, due to employee fatigue, personal judgement errors, negligence and/or inadequate training. Human error caused a reported 2,712 casualties in 2018, and cost $1.6 billion in losses from 2011 to 2016; cargo ships accounted for 56% of all vessels lost. Working on deck, for example during mooring operations, is estimated to be 5 to 16 times more dangerous than jobs onshore. Several argue that the introduction of fully autonomous and semi-autonomous ships will reduce the number and severity of these accidents due to both a lack of crew on board and the better performance that autonomous systems deliver.

=== Reduction of costs ===
According to a study carried out by the Technical University of Denmark, it is estimated that an onboard crew member costs in the form of salaries, insurances and on-board provisions around 1 million DKK or $150,000 annually, with crew costs typically accounting for around 20–30% of the total cost for a cargo ships journey. Semi-autonomous or fully autonomous ships can potentially reduce and eliminate these costs, creating an incentive for shipping companies who strive for cost reduction in an increasingly competitive market. Autonomous ships may however increase onshore costs in the form of large upfront investments and upkeep of control and operations centers, sensors, data servers and communication assets such as high-bandwidth satellites.

=== Energy efficiency and environmental impact ===
The removal of human crews would allow the construction of ships without ship facilities needed for human operation such as the bridge or for human livability such as sleeping quarters, plumbing, mess hall and electrical wiring, reducing weight and increasing reliability. This would allow autonomous ships to be built lighter and use less of its size for the crew, reducing fuel consumption and environmental impact.

=== Piracy ===
Rolls-Royce have argued that low-tech piracy activities aimed towards ships and their crews will reduce as a result of ships becoming autonomous. Ships can be constructed so that it will be difficult to board them, with cargo access and manual controls being made unavailable. In the case of a piracy event, control centers can immobilize the ship or having it sail a specific course until naval authorities can reach it. Without the presence of a crew to hold hostage and ransom, the cargo ships are argued to be less valuable targets for pirates.

== Potential challenges ==
=== Reliability ===
Currently most crews on board commercial cargo ships primarily consist of navigational officers and engine crews who maintain the ship's propulsion machinery, auxiliary machinery, generators for procuring electricity, separators, pumps, cooling system. These systems are often quite complex and require regular maintenance. Increasing redundancy is seen as the solution, either by having two engine systems or by using different propulsion methods that contain fewer moving parts such as electricity on MV Yara Birkeland.

=== Regulation ===
International regulation is seen as one of the biggest challenges facing autonomous ships. Rule 5 in the International Regulations for Preventing Collisions at Sea (COLREG) requires there to be a lookout present in order to avoid collisions and the International Convention for the Safety of Life at Sea (SOLAS) require ships to be able to assist in search and rescue operations, such as picking up survivors in case of a shipwreck. Without any human on-board autonomous vessels, it will be a difficult task to comply with these regulations. The IMO has begun work to review the portions of the treatises that affect autonomous shipping, yet some argue that work is going too slow as advances are being made and autonomous ships already being prepared to be launched.

As of 2021, Maritime Safety Committee, Legal Committee, Facilitation Committee, and Marine Environment Protection Committee of the International Maritime Organization conducted Regulatory Scoping Exercise for the use of MASS.

There are states which already developed and implemented their national regulation on MASS. Among them, the Russian Federation adopted Government Decree No 2031, “On Carrying Out the Trials of Autonomous Ships Flying the State Flag of the Russian Federation”, “Guidelines on COLREG application on MASS”, and developed Federal Law on legal relationship arising from the use of autonomous ships.

=== Cyber security ===
Cyber attacks have become an increased threat in maritime shipping, where hackers have managed to compromise systems such as AIS, using cheap jammers to spoof GPS signals and hacking into the servers of container terminals in order to get shipping manifests. The maritime industry has been criticized for not being able to keep up with technological innovation, lagging 10–20 years behind other industries and leaving computer networks insecure and open for intrusion by organized crime and state actors.

Due to the increased reliance on information and communications technology in semi- and fully autonomous ships, cyber security becomes an even more serious issue that companies would need to address. On board ship controls and data might be compromised and vulnerable to cyber attacks as the autonomous ships require a constant connection to allow monitoring and control. The complexity of a ship design with various components from different providers can make it hard to detect and stop cyber attacks from occurring. If an autonomous ship would come under cyber attack, regaining control of the ship can become difficult because the lack of on-board crew that can take control manually. Specific systems and risk assessments for autonomous ships are proposed order to address this problem.

Another problem is that due to increased data transmission needed to be sent back and forth between ships and onshore command centers, it increases the chances of "data swamping," where vast amounts of raw data will be produced and transmitted. To achieve more efficient use of storage and communication capacity, smart pre-processing and compression schemes are needed in order to reduce the chances of "data swamping."

=== Safety concerns over insufficient training ===
While autonomous ships are expected to be a routine part of the world shipping industry, the transition phase will require human operation and intervention. At the moment, there is insufficient training for human operations involved in degrees one, two, and three of maritime autonomous surface ships, creating an insecure operational environment. The IMO’s principal regulatory convention includes an instrument titled “The International Convention on Standard of Training, Certification and Watchkeeping for Seafarers of 1978” that outlines the minimum standards of competence required for human operators. The STCW Code was last amended in 2018, therefore it is fairly outdated and lacks training standards related to any level of MASS autonomy.

Insufficient and improper education of autonomous ships rapidly increases the chances of ship collision. Currently, the main causes for manned and autonomous ship collisions are derived from inexperience, poor manning level, poor training, unfamiliarity with equipment, and bad decision- making. Positions such as unmanned vessel operators, autonomous ship supervisors, and watch officers are in high demand, however, the problem of nonstandardized training procedures must be resolved to be able to ensure that these individuals have a deep understanding of all of the capabilities, as well as limitations, of the autonomous and non-autonomous systems.

Cyber security training for the crew is another overlooked training that creates unstable safety environments. Presently, cyber security training for crew is not required. However, as cyber incidents increase in volume, their management has the potential to affect the fitness of manned and autonomous ships. The lack of proper cyber security training makes the vessel vulnerable to the plugging in of personal devices, jamming of safety-critical networks, spear-phishing, and system engineering. Simple cyber hygiene education regarding the difference between onboard networks for operational use and recreational can have considerable influence on the security of autonomous ships.

=== Liability and legal issues ===
It is unclear who would be liable in the event of an accident with an autonomous ship: several parties, such as the company, the software provider, hardware provider or the onshore monitoring stations might be at fault. Historically, captains are assumed to be in overall command of their ships and are the first to be put under scrutiny if anything happens. Without a clear leader in charge, international regulation must determine who is ultimately responsible for any incidents involving autonomous ships.

== See also ==
- Unmanned surface vehicle
- MV Yara Birkeland
