= Zara Roberts =

British sailor, watersports and fitness instructor

Zara Roberts is a British sailor, watersports and fitness instructor. She is best known for being the first woman to be named Yachtmaster of the Year by the Royal Yachting Association (RYA) in 2016.

== Career ==
Roberts grew up in Scarborough, England, where she began sailing through the Sea Cadets. She later trained as a watersports instructor, gaining experience in sailing, windsurfing, and powerboating.

Roberts worked as a sailing instructor in the United Kingdom and Australia, including time in Sydney. She trained through the UK Sailing Academy and later pursued studies in nutrition alongside her maritime career.

She also works as a model, fitness instructor and personal trainer.

== Yachtmaster of the Year ==
In 2016, Roberts passed the RYA Yachtmaster Offshore (Power) examination with an exceptional result and was nominated by her examiner. She was subsequently selected as the Royal Yachting Association's Yachtmaster of the Year from more than 3,000 candidates worldwide.

The award was presented by Anne, Princess Royal at the London Boat Show in January 2017.

Roberts was the first woman to receive the award.
