= Coastal Skipper =

A coastal skipper is a yachtsman or woman who has the ability to skipper a yacht in coastal waters by day or night. There is a shore-based course which provides the background knowledge required, a practical course which teaches the skills and techniques required, and a Certificate of Competence.

While the qualification originated in the United Kingdom, the course is taught worldwide. Recognised sailing Schools authorised to conduct the training can be found on the RYA website.

== RYA Coastal Skipper Practical Sailing Course ==
This is a course for potential skippers and those attending should already have a good knowledge of the theory of navigation and meteorology, and have a level of experience approaching that for the Coastal Skipper Certificate of Competence. The course may be taken in tidal and non-tidal versions.

=== Assumed knowledge ===
- Navigation to Coastal Skipper Shorebased standard.
- Sailing to Day Skipper Practical standard.
- 15 days sea time (2 days as skipper) - 300 miles, 8 night hours.

=== Course content ===
- Passage planning: Can plan a coastal passage including a consideration of the capabilities of the yacht, navigation, victualling, weather, ports of refuge, tidal heights and tidal streams, publications required and strategy. Knows customs procedures for most common circumstances.
- Preparation for sea: Aware of safety equipment required for offshore passages, and can prepare a yacht for sea including stowage, safety briefing, watch keeping, delegating responsibilities and equipment and engine checks
- Pilotage: Preparing a pilotage plan, with consideration of soundings, transits, clearing bearings, buoyage, port or harbour regulations and tidal considerations. Able to pilot a yacht by day and night.
- Organisational and skipper skills: Can take charge of a yacht and direct the crew, organise the navigation, deck work and domestic duties of a yacht on passage, awareness of the significance of meteorological trends, aware of crew welfare and can use electronic navigational equipment for planning and undertaking a passage, including the use of waypoints and routes.
- Yacht handling under power: Able to control the yacht effectively in a confined space under power, including all berthing and unberthing situations in various conditions of wind and tide.
- Yacht handling under sail: Can use the sails to control the yacht in a confined space, and capable of anchoring and mooring in various conditions of wind and tide.
- Adverse weather conditions: Understanding of preparations for heavy weather and yacht handling in strong winds, and navigation in restricted visibility.
- Emergency situations: Recovery of man overboard under power or sail, actions to be taken when abandoning to the liferaft and during helicopter and lifeboat rescues.

== RYA Coastal Skipper and Yachtmaster Offshore Shore-based Course ==
This course assumes that the student has already studied navigation to Day Skipper Shore-based standard. This is an advanced course in navigation and meteorology for candidates for the Coastal Skipper and Yachtmaster Offshore Certificate. The course lasts about 40 hours. It may be taken continuously over several days, or as evening or several weekends, or by distance learning.

== See also ==
- Competent Crew
- Day Skipper
- Yachtmaster
- Sportküstenschifferschein (German coastal sailing license)
