= Code Européen des Voies de la Navigation Intérieure =

European code for rivers, canals and lakes

The Code Européen des Voies de la Navigation Intérieure (CEVNI; European Code for Navigation on Inland Waterways) is the European code for rivers, canals and lakes in most of Europe.

Not all European countries use CEVNI for their inland waterways. The United Kingdom, the Nordic countries, Spain, Italy and the Balkans except Croatia have their own regulations.

CEVNI contains the core uniform rules applicable to the traffic on inland waterways, such as visual signs on vessels, sound signals and radiotelephony, waterway signs and markings, rules of the road, berthing rules, and prevention of pollution of water and disposal of waste.

Map of CEVNI countries

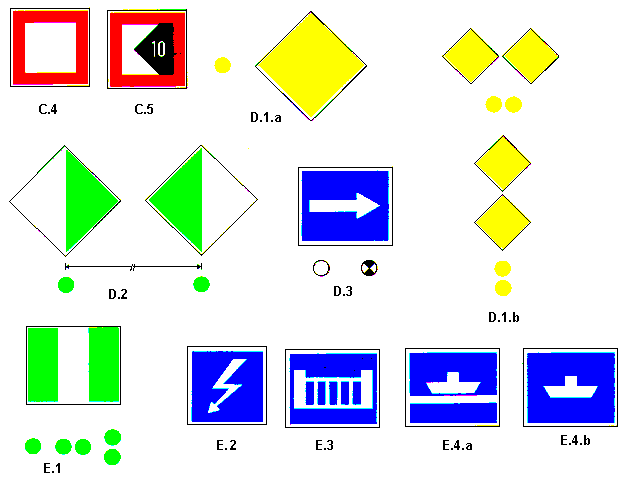
A set of CEVNI signs in the Czech Republic

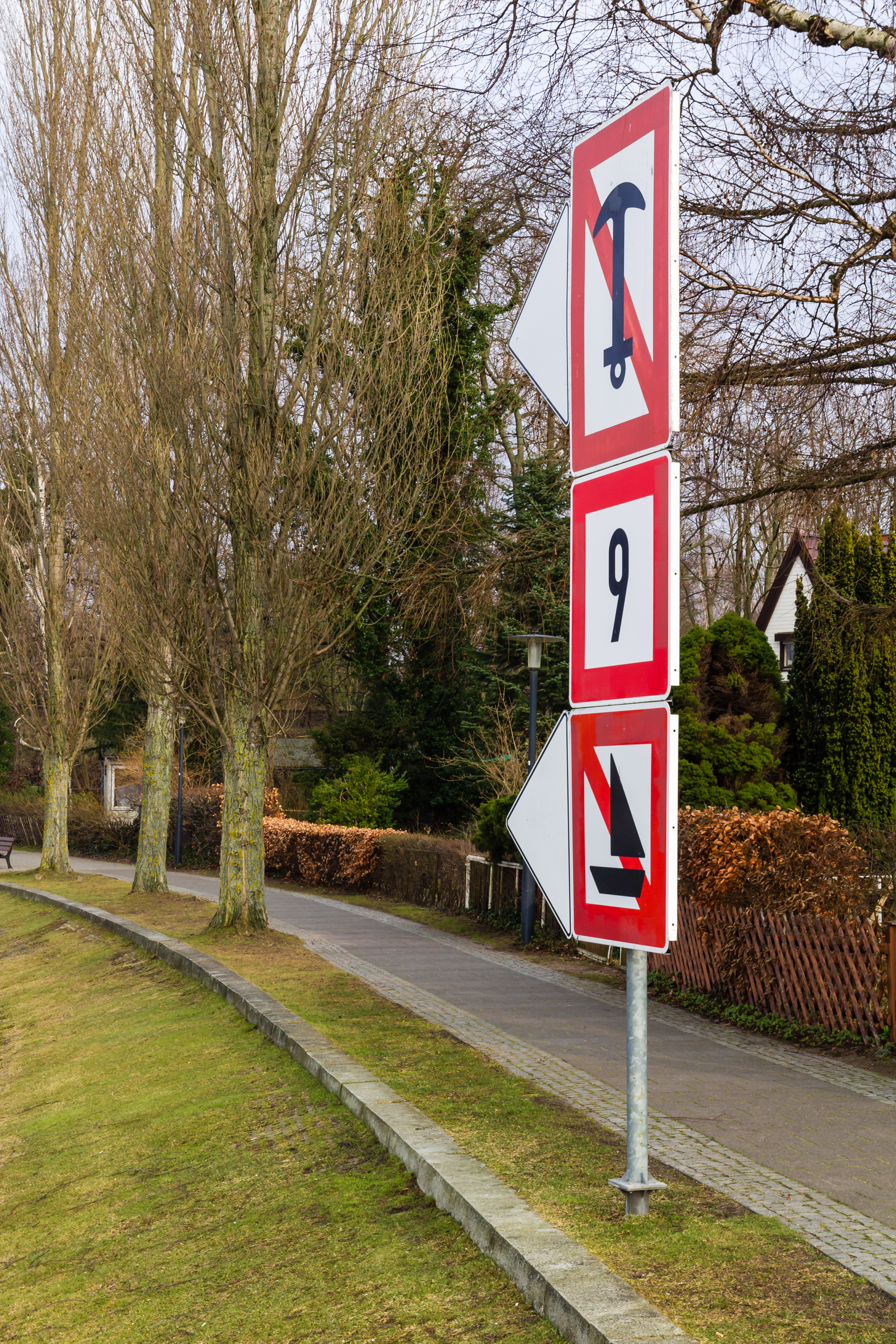
CEVNI signs displayed in Germany

== See also ==
- International Certificate for Operators of Pleasure Craft
- International Regulations for Preventing Collisions at Sea
