= International Yacht Training Worldwide =

Boating training organization

International Yacht Training Worldwide (IYT Worldwide) is an independent sailing and boating training organization which provides education and training standards for professional and recreational boaters and yachtsmen and women. It was originally based entirely in Fort Lauderdale, Florida, USA; it is now a British Columbia, Canada Corporation based in Kelowna. Its qualifications are similar to those of the Royal Yachting Association (RYA) at the recreational level, but IYT Worldwide also offers additional courses at the professional level. It is regulated by a number of Maritime Administrations and has an ISO Quality Management System to independently monitor and control all of its training standards. The IYT recreational yacht training system goes from introductory sailing through to Yachtmaster Ocean.

== History ==
IYT Worldwide was founded by Mark Fry in 1998 as a credible alternative to the RYA with the purpose of providing training for crews of superyachts by offering professional yachtsmen and women the opportunity to train for their career outside the UK, a first for the professional yachting fraternity. IYT Worldwide was approved, and its courses recognized by the UK Maritime and Coastguard Agency (MCA), in October 1999 and is now recognized as a world leader by multiple administrations due to its numerous (20 plus) international recognitions covering a large number of its courses. IYT has trained over 350,000 candidates in the last 22 years. Due to its dedication to high standards, quality training and the implementation of its ISO 9001:2015 Quality Management System, the company has enjoyed an international expansion which now includes more than 300 partner schools in 64 countries. No other yacht training organisation is as internationally recognised or accepted as IYT.

== Global spread ==
Initially recognized for its professional courses, IYT has successfully developed professional, recreational and other boating watersports courses delivered through licensed training schools. There are currently over 300 partner schools around the world in 64 different countries (November 2020). These include Australia, Austria, Bahamas, Barbados, Belarus, Brazil, British Virgin Islands, Brunei, Bulgaria, Canada, Cayman Islands, China, Croatia, Cyprus, Egypt, Estonia, Finland, France, French West Indies, Gibraltar, Greece, Honduras, Hungary, Hong Kong, Indonesia, Ireland, Israel, Italy, Kuwait, Latvia, Lebanon, Lithuania, Malaysia, Maldives, Malta, Moldova, Montenegro, Norway, Philippines, Poland, Portugal, Romania, Russia, Singapore, St Maarten, Slovakia, Slovenia, South Africa, Spain, St Lucia, Sweden, Switzerland, Taiwan, Thailand, Turkey, Ukraine, United Arab Emirates, United Kingdom and the United States.

== Membership ==
There are two membership levels, those partner schools offering recreational courses and those offering professional yachting courses such as Master of Yachts (MOY) and STCW, Basic Safety Training.

Two levels of qualification may be obtained from IYT Worldwide training providers:

Level 1

- Recreational boating courses from ‘Introduction to Boating’ through ‘Recreational Yachtmaster Coastal, Yachmaster Offshore and Yachtmaster Ocean’ ( Modules 1 to 21 in the IYT Passport booklet)
- VHF SRC Radio Operators Certificate
- Small Powerboat & RIB Master (includes VHF certification)
- Superyacht Deck Crew (includes Small Powerboat & RIB Master and VHF)
- Superyacht Interior Crew
- International Certificate of Competency (ICC)
- Personal Watercraft Operations

Level 2

- Master of Yacht Training (MOY) – Mate 200 Ton/Coastal, Master of Yacht 200 Ton Limited and Master of Yacht 200 Ton Unlimited
- STCW ‘95 Basic Training – (Standard of Training and Certification for Watchkeepers) 5 Modules over 6 days – required by the IMO (International Maritime Organisation) for employment on commercially operated yachts carrying passengers.
- Diveboat Master Level 1 and Level 2 (includes General Engineering Knowledge)

== International Certificate of Competence - ICC ==
International Certificate of Competence Also referred to as International Certificate of Competency, is intended to provide evidence of competence when requested by officials in foreign countries. It is often required to operate a vessel in EU waters, both coastal and internal.

An International Certificate of Competence (ICC) is a certificate which may be issued to anyone who has successfully completed certain national boating licenses or met the ICC Standards of Knowledge and practical competencies under UN Resolution 40. Almost all member states within the European Union have accepted the IYT World ICC.

Although only guaranteed to be accepted in countries that have adopted the relevant UN Resolution 40, the ICC is a useful document to carry and will generally be accepted where proof of competence is required.

In general terms an ICC is required for the inland waterways of Europe and for inland and coastal waters of Mediterranean countries. For the coastal waters of Northern Europe the ICC is generally not required, however to all of these generalizations there are exceptions.

If in doubt, be sure to check with the country administration you are visiting and the charter company that you are chartering with.
