= Brussels Collision Convention =

Multilateral treaty on collisions between ships at sea

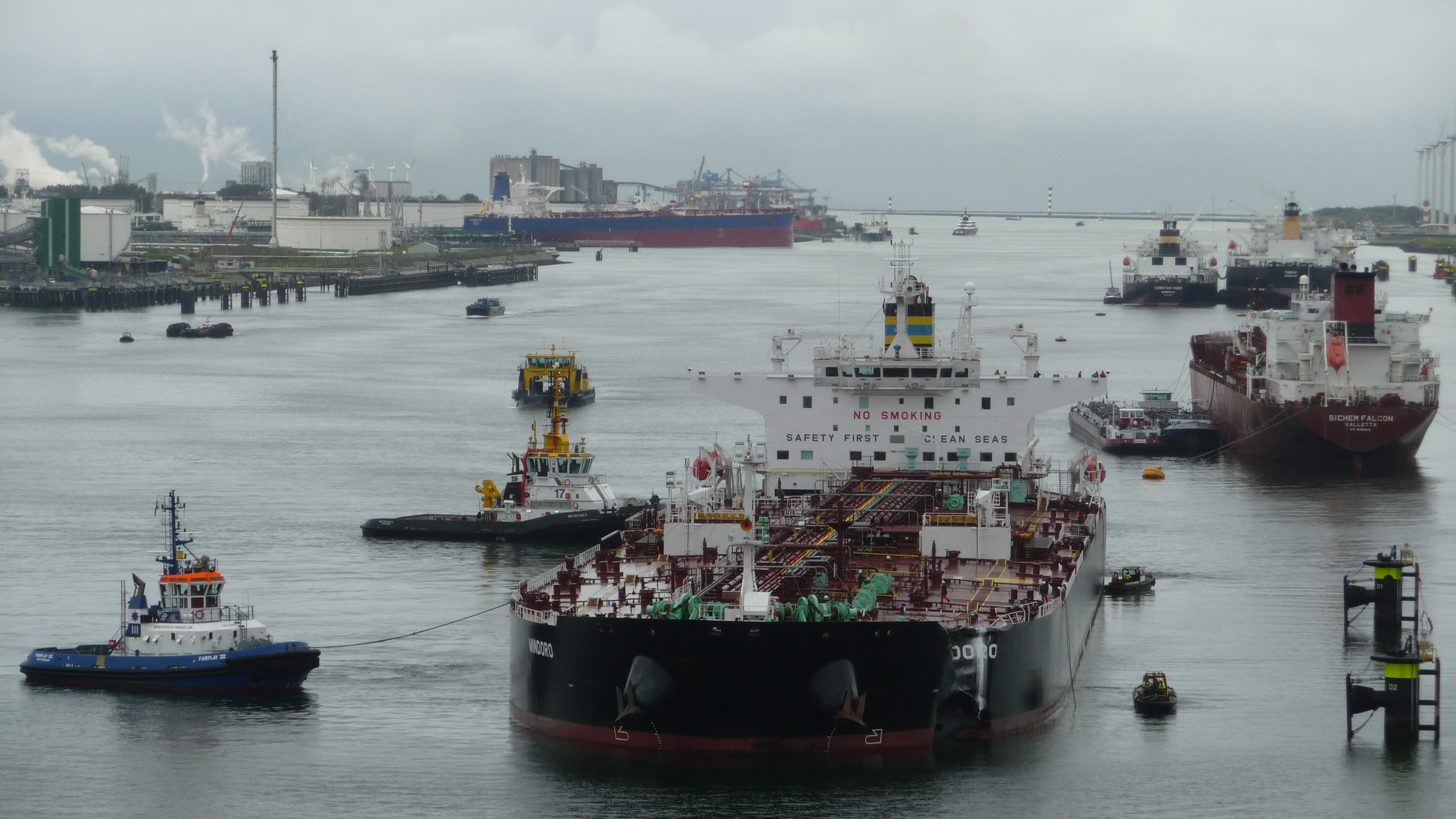
Oil tanker Mindoro mooring in the Caland Canal after a collision with Jork Ranger

The Brussels Collision Convention (formally, the Convention for the Unification of Certain Rules of Law with respect to Collisions between Vessels (French: Convention internationale pour l'unification de certaines règles en matière d'abordage)) is a 1910 multilateral treaty that established the rules of legal liability that result from collisions between ships at sea.

== Content ==
Three general rules of legal liability are established by the Convention:

1. If a collision occurs that is accidental or of uncertain cause, the damages are borne by the party that suffers them;
2. If a collision occurs that is the fault of a party, the party at fault is liable for the damages that were caused; and
3. If a collision occurs that is the fault of more than one party, the parties at fault are liable in proportion to the faults respectively committed. (If it is not possible to determine the proportional fault, the liability is apportioned equally between the parties at fault.)

The implementation of these rules abolished any pre-existing legal presumptions as to which party bore fault in maritime collisions.

== Creation and ratification ==
The Convention was concluded at the Brussels Maritime Conference and signed by 24 states on 23 September 1910. It entered into force on 1 March 1913 and by the Second World War had been ratified by most of the major sea-faring nations. It remains in force for many states as the Convention that governs apportionment of fault in maritime collision cases. The states that signed the treaty but have not ratified it are the United States, Cuba, and Chile. The depositary of the Convention is the government of Belgium.

== See also ==
- International Regulations for Preventing Collisions at Sea
