= MV Yara Birkeland =

Norwegian container ship

History
- Name: Yara Birkeland
- Namesake: Yara International and Kristian Birkeland
- Owner: Yara International
- Route: Herøya–Brevik, 7 NM (13 km)
- Ordered: 2017
- Builder: Marin Teknik, Vard Brattvaag(Fincantieri)
- Cost: $25m
- In service: 2022
- Identification: IMO number: 9865049; MMSI number: 257646000

General characteristics
- Type: Autonomous cargo ship
- Tonnage: 3,200 DWT
- Length: Over 80 metres (260 ft)
- Beam: 15 metres (49 ft)
- Draught: 5 metres (16 ft)
- Depth: 12 metres (39 ft)
- Installed power: Batteries 6,800 kWh, 6,600 V
- Propulsion: Electric motors driving 2 azimuth pods (2x 900 kW) and 2 tunnel thrusters (2x 700 kW)
- Speed: 6 knots (11 km/h) service; 12 knots (22 km/h) maximum
- Capacity: 120 TEU
- Crew: manned
- Notes: First autonomous commercial ship in the world.

MV Yara Birkeland is an autonomous 120 TEU container ship carrying fertilizer between ports at Herøya and Brevik in Norway. The Yara Birkeland was designed to serve as a proof of concept for a fully autonomous ship capable of global travel and with multiple functions from industrial site operations to port operations.

== Construction ==
Yara Birkeland is 80 metres (260 ft) long, with a beam of 14.8 metres (49 ft) and a depth of 12 metres (39 ft). It has a draught of 6 metres (20 ft). Electric motors driving two azimuth pods and two tunnel thrusters. Batteries rated at 6.7 MWh power the electric motors, giving it an optimal speed of 6 knots (11 km/h) and a maximum speed of 10 knots (19 km/h). It has a capacity of 120 TEU. Costing $25million (NOK250 million) it is designed by Marin Teknikk, with navigation equipment by Kongsberg Maritime. The Norwegian Government gave a grant of NOK133.6 million towards the construction of the ship, about a third of the total cost, in September 2017.

== Operation ==
Yara Birkeland is named after its owners Yara International and its founder, Norwegian scientist Kristian Birkeland. Yara Birkeland sails between Herøya and Brevik (~7 nautical miles (13 km)) carrying chemicals and fertiliser, and is intended to reduce road truck traffic by 40,000 loads per year. In late November, 2021, the ship sailed to Oslo, where it was toured by the Prime Minister of Norway, Jonas Gahr Støre, on Friday, November 19, 2021. As of August 2021, remote operation was intended to start in late 2021, though regulatory obstacles lie ahead of its intended start of commercial operations in 2022. The ship was christened on April 29, 2022 in Brevik where 500 local students and Crown Prince Haakon were attending. Regulations require crew on board for two years before being considered for remote control.

== Legacy ==
In 2019, the Yara Birkeland was a finalist in the annual Nor-Shipping Next Generation Ship competition.

== See also ==
- Unmanned surface vehicle
