= Competent Crew =

Sailing yacht entry-level course

Competent Crew is the entry-level course of the Royal Yachting Association for those who wish to be active crew members of a sailing yacht. It is a hands-on course and by the end of the course participants should be able to steer, handle sails, keep a lookout, row a dinghy and assist in all the day-to-day duties on board.

No pre-course knowledge or experience are assumed. The minimum duration of the course is 5 days. It may be run over 5 days or over 3 weekends or 3 days plus a weekend. For those who have done the Start Yachting course, this course can be completed in 3 or 4 days. There is no minimum age.

== Course content ==
Knowledge of sea terms and parts of a boat, sail handling, ropework, fire precautions and fighting, personal safety equipment, man overboard, emergency equipment, meteorology, seasickness, helmsmanship, general duties, manners and customs, rules of the road, dinghies.

== Progression ==
The Competent Crew course is one of a structured series of courses run by the RYA. Additional courses in the series include Day Skipper Shorebased & Practical, Coastal Skipper and Yachtmaster Shorebased, Coastal Skipper Practical, .

== See also ==
- Day Skipper
- Coastal Skipper
- Yachtmaster
