= Day Skipper =

British yachting qualification

The Day Skipper qualification confirms that the successful candidate has the knowledge needed to skipper a yacht on shorter, coastal cruises during daylight. The Royal Yachting Association administers the qualification, although most of the training is carried out by private companies.

It is a part of a series of qualifications that include Competent Crew, Helmsman, Coastal Skipper and Yachtmaster. While the qualification is primarily for the United Kingdom, it is widely recognised internationally.

The course has two elements, a theory and practical. Candidates must complete the theory part of the course first to be able to apply this knowledge during the practical course.

Some sailing Schools holding RYA recognition may allow Day Skipper training without first taking the shore-based course, if the student can navigate up to Day Skipper standards. However, theory knowledge will still be tested while out on the water.

RYA Recognised sailing Schools are displayed on the RYA website.

== Day Skipper Theory ==
The theory part of the Day Skipper qualification is a shore-based (classroom) course that takes a minimum of 40 hours, followed by an exam. Alternatively, this can be completed online by distance learning which offers greater flexibility in study.

Course Content includes:

- Nautical terminology
- Ropework - knots and rope types
- Anchors and anchoring
- Safety, including safety equipment, fire, personal safety equipment such as harnesses and life jackets, distress signals and rescue procedures
- International regulations for preventing collisions at sea
- Measuring position, course and speed
- Using navigational charts and publications
- Using electronic charts and chartplotters
- Using navigational instruments
- Planning and navigation a course
- Understanding tides, Tide tables
- Calculating heights of tide using tidal curves
- Lighthouses and beacons
- Buoyage systems, IALA A and IALA B
- Weather and meteorology
- Planning a passage
- Navigation in restricted visibility
- Pilotage, pilotage plans and harbour entry
- Environmental awareness

== Day Skipper Practical ==
The practical element of the day skipper course takes approximately 5 days on board a suitable yacht, and can be taken in tidal or non-tidal waters.

The Day Skipper Practical Course includes:

- Preparing a yacht for sea, including engine, sails and gear.
- Deck work, including reefing, shaking out reefs, changing sails, preparing an anchor, mooring, anchoring, weighing anchor
- Practical navigation – taking and plotting visual fixes, electronic navigation equipment, estimating tidal heights, steering to allow for tidal stream, leeway and drift, navigational records, echo sounders and lead lines
- Pilotage, including pilotage plans for entry or departure from a harbour
- Meteorology, weather and forecasts
- Maintenance and repair work
- Engines, refuelling and emergency maintenance
- Victualing
- Emergency drills, including Man overboard, distress flares, life rafts, VHF radio, securing a tow, helicopter rescue
- Organising and keeping a watch
- Yacht Handling under power
- Yacht handling under sail
- Passage making – planning and making a coastal passage

=== Day Skipper Requirements ===
There are no practical qualification requirements, but it is recommended that participants are at least Competent Crew standard before taking the Practical course. Participants should have 5 days, 100 miles and 4 night hours on board a sailing yacht and theory knowledge to Day Skipper level. Minimum age is 16.

== See also ==
- Competent Crew
- Coastal Skipper
- Yachtmaster
