= International Certificate for Operators of Pleasure Craft =

Sailing license approved by United Nations

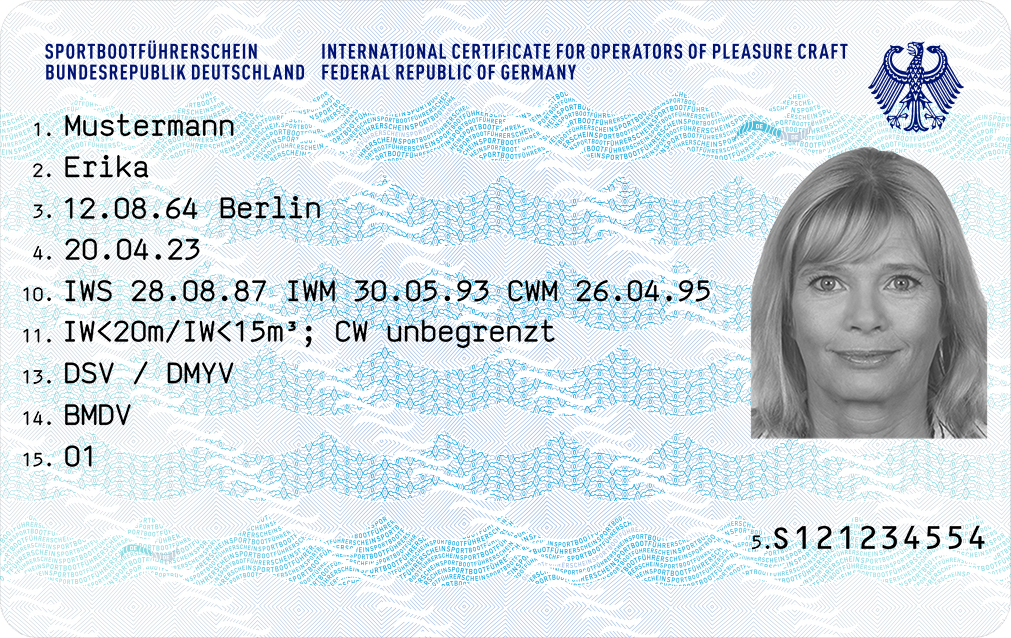
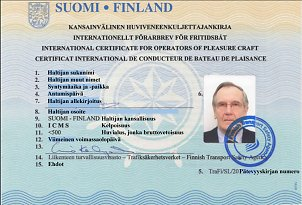
- Examples of ICCs issued in Germany and Finland.
- Map of the 22 states applying UNECE Resolution No. 40, as well as the three states applying the earlier UNECE Resolution No. 14.
- Type: Certificate of competence for operators of pleasure craft
- Issued by: Competent authorities and approved bodies designated by states applying UNECE Resolution No. 40 or Resolution No. 14
- First issued: 29 January 1979
- Purpose: Evidence of competence to operate a pleasure craft in an internationally recognizable format
- Valid in: States applying UNECE Resolution No. 40 or Resolution No. 14, subject to national conditions
- Eligibility: Varies by issuing state; applicants must meet the applicable nationality or residency and competence requirements

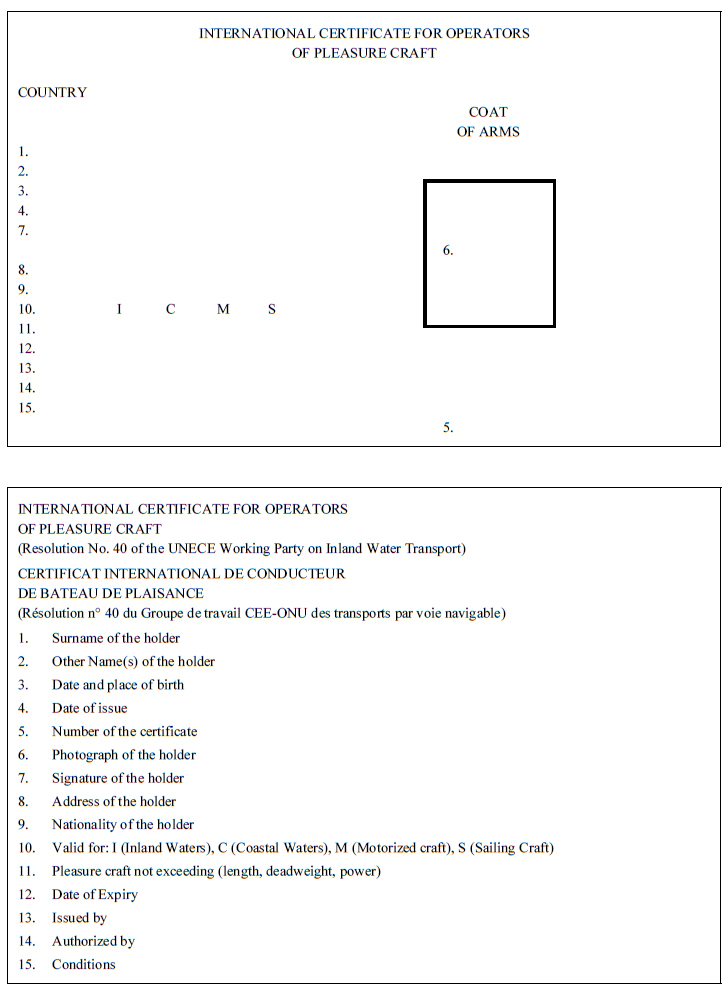
Specimen of an International Certificate for Operators of Pleasure Craft in accordance with Resolution No. 40 of the UN/ECE Working Party on Inland Water Transport.

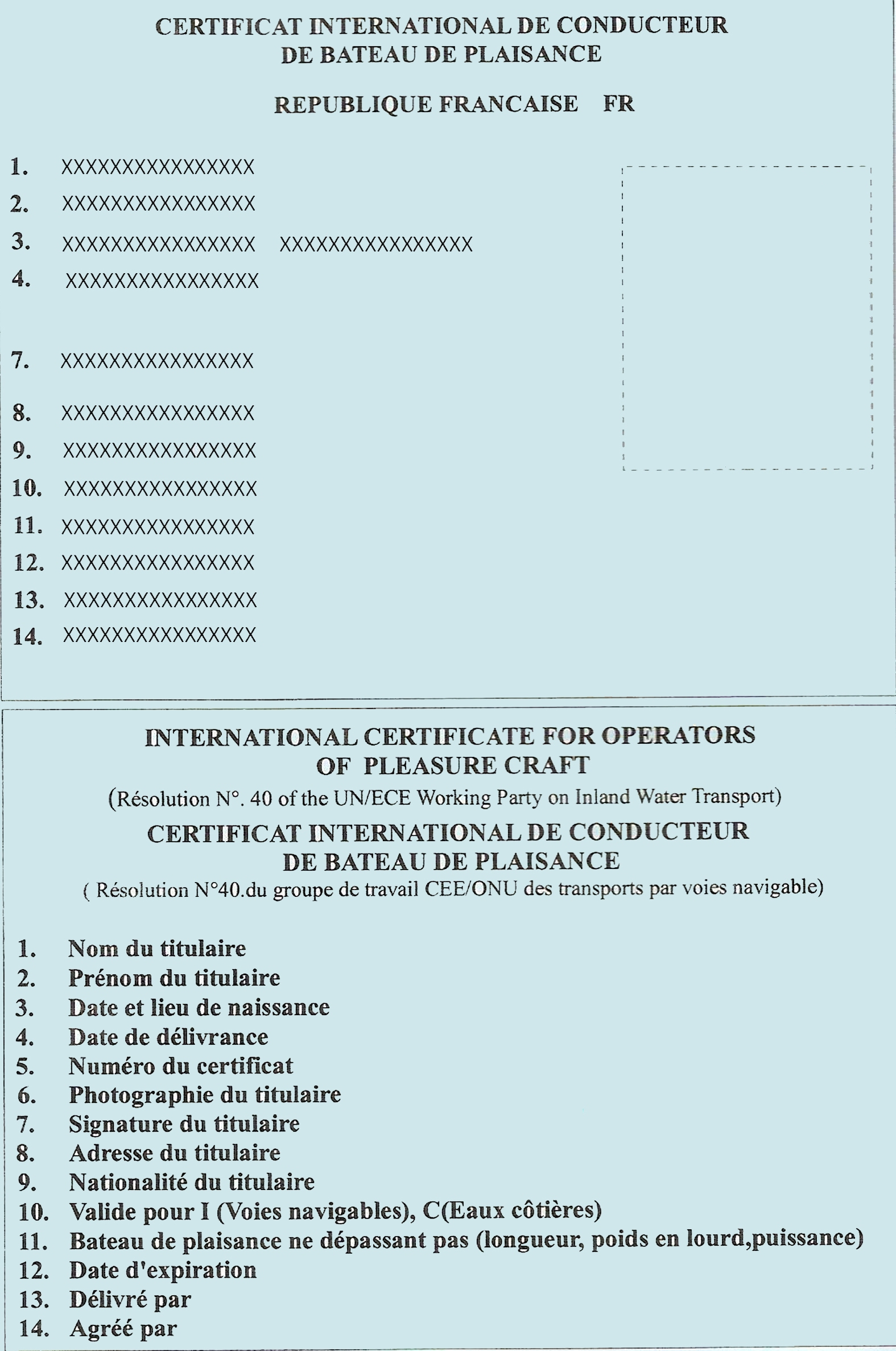
France specimen of an International Certificate.

An International Certificate for Operators of Pleasure Craft (ICC), informally referred to as an International Certificate of Competence (ICC), is a certificate issued under United Nations Economic Commission for Europe (UNECE) Resolution No. 40 or, in states that continue to apply it, the earlier Resolution No. 14. It may be issued to a person who has successfully completed an approved national boating qualification or passed an examination demonstrating the competence necessary to operate a pleasure craft.

The ICC is the only sailing license approved by the United Nations as a legitimate recreational sailing license. Although formal recognition is limited to countries applying the relevant United Nations resolutions, the ICC is commonly accepted where evidence of boating competence is required.

In broad terms, an ICC is often required on the inland waterways of Europe and on the inland and coastal waters of Mediterranean countries. It is generally not required in the coastal waters of Northern Europe. Requirements vary, however, according to the country, the waters concerned, the vessel and the circumstances of its operation, and exceptions exist in each region.

== Description of the ICC ==
The ICC is a product of the United Nations Economic Commission for Europe Inland Water Committee (UN ECE IWC) Resolution 40 (hereafter called Resolution 40). This states that the ICC may be issued by a government of one state to its nationals and residents who may be on the waters of a foreign state, on condition that both accept the requirements and conditions set out in Resolution 40.

Governments may appoint competent authorities to issue ICC on their behalf. Globally International Yacht Training Worldwide (IYT) has been delegated such authority by both Ireland and the UK, and the Royal Yachting Association (RYA) and the British Sub-Aqua Club (BSAC) are both authorized by the UK.

The ICC provides documentary assurance from one government to another that the holder meets the levels of competence laid down in Resolution 40. However, the acceptance of Resolution 40 is often caveated.

== History of the ICC ==
The origins of the ICC arose from navigation on the Rhine and the Danube (Central Commission for Navigation on the Rhine) and the need for reassurance that vessel operators were competent to ensure safety of navigation and protection of the environment as they moved from one country to another. As a result, on 29 January 1979, the United Nations Working Party on Inland Water Transport adopted Resolution 14, which recommended the introduction of a European document for an International Certificate (International Card) to provide those assurances. The Resolution was also intended to facilitate 'waterborne tourism'. Until then operators could well have been expected to produce competency certificates for each country whose waters they were on.

In the mid-nineties, the Working Group on Inland Water Transport considered that Resolution 14 needed updating and strengthening and on 16 October 1998 the Working Party adopted their revisions as Resolution 40; this replaced Resolution 14.

The ICC is only applicable where the visited state has also adopted or recognises the ICC as a valid standard of competency.

== Application of the ICC ==
Resolution 40 not only included operators of pleasure craft bound for or on the inland and coastal waters of foreign states but specifically included bareboat charter vessels. Significantly, it also set out the nautical, regulatory and technical competency requirements to be achieved and a minimum age (16 years of age) for the issue of an ICC irrespective of individual national schemes.

It is the professional opinion of the UNECE IWC that the standards set out in Resolution 40 provide a reasonable and appropriate level of competence for day sailing with due regard to the safety of navigation and crew and the protection of the environment. It is strongly recommended that governments recognise this rather than be drawn into discussions on where the ICC may or may not fit into their own national schemes – much the same as acceptance of the international driving licence.

As of 2026, 25 states apply either Resolution 40 or the earlier Resolution 14. Of these, 24 are UNECE member states; South Africa applies Resolution 40 but is not a UNECE member state. In reality many countries choose to accept the ICC even though they have not adopted the resolution – but of course this is on their terms and can be subject to local variations. Spain, Greece and Portugal, for example, have not adopted Resolution 40 but are still most likely to ask visitors for an ICC. In reality, the ICC is more widely accepted as proof of the holder’s competence than adoption of Resolution 40 would suggest.

=== Application of Resolution 40 ===
The following states apply Resolution 40 and therefore officially recognize ICCs issued under the resolution, subject to any conditions they have notified to the UNECE. All are UNECE member states except South Africa:

Country	Competent authority for authorization of ICCs	Approved body(ies) for issuing ICCs	Earliest documented date of application	Reference	Basis and explanation
Austria	Federal Ministry of Innovation, Mobility and Infrastructure (Bundesministerium für Innovation, Mobilität und Infrastruktur) (inland and coastal); Offices of the regional governments (inland only)	Austrian Motorboating Federation (Motorbootsport u. Seefahrts Verband Österreich (MSVÖ)) (until 31 December 2011); Austrian Sailing Federation (Österreichischer Segel-Verband (OeSV)) (until 31 December 2011); via donau (from 1 January 2012)	6 August 2002		UNECE status report showing Resolution No. 40 as applied by Austria. The original notification date is unknown.
Belarus	State Inspectorate for Small Craft	State Inspectorate for Small Craft	5 October 2013		UNECE document recording Resolution No. 40 as applied and stating that Belarus accepted it. An earlier 2002 record described only partial application, so the exact date of full acceptance remains unknown.
Belgium	General Directorate for Maritime Transport of the Federal Public Service Mobility and Transport	General Directorate for Maritime Transport of the Federal Public Service Mobility and Transport	30 May 2011		National implementation date. Belgium informed UNECE that it implemented Resolution No. 40 through a Royal Decree of 30 May 2011. The acceptance communication was published by UNECE on 12 September 2011.
Bulgaria	Bulgarian Maritime Administration (Изпълнителна агенция "Морска администрация")	Bulgarian Maritime Administration	5 October 2013		UNECE document recording Resolution No. 40 as applied by Bulgaria. The original notification date is unknown.
Croatia	Croatian Harbour Master’s Offices (Lučka Kapetanija Sisak, Lučka Kapetanija Slavonski Brod, Lučka Kapetanija Osijek and Lučka Kapetanija Vukovar)	Croatian Harbour Master’s Offices (Sisak, Slavonski Brod, Osijek and Vukovar)	6 August 2002		UNECE status report showing Resolution No. 40 as applied by Croatia. The original notification date is unknown.
Czech Republic	State Navigation Administration (Státní plavební správa)	State Navigation Administration	6 August 2002		UNECE status report showing Resolution No. 40 as applied by the Czech Republic. A later report states that a new International Certificate for Operators of Pleasure Craft based on the resolution began being issued on 1 March 2010.
Finland	Finnish Transport and Communications Agency (TRAFICOM) (Liikenne- ja viestintävirasto)	Finnish Transport and Communications Agency (TRAFICOM)	5 October 2013		UNECE confirmation issued after Finland's earlier status had been corrected to "not applied". The document records Resolution No. 40 as applied. The exact intervening acceptance date is unknown.
Germany	Federal Ministry for Transport (Bundesministerium für Verkehr)	German Motor Yachting Association (Deutscher Motoryachtverband e.V.); German Sailing Association (Deutscher Segler-Verband e.V.)	6 August 2002		UNECE status report showing Resolution No. 40 as applied by Germany. The original notification date is unknown.
Hungary	National Transport Authority (Nemzeti Közlekedési Hatóság)	National Transport Authority	5 October 2013		UNECE confirmation recording Resolution No. 40 as applied by Hungary. The original notification date is unknown.
(Republic of Ireland) Ireland	Marine Survey Office of the Maritime Safety Directorate of the Department of Transport	Irish Sailing Association (ISA); International Yacht Training (formerly known as International Yachtmaster Training); Irish Waterski and Wakeboard Federation (IWWF)	9 August 2004		UNECE document expressly stating that Ireland accepts Resolution No. 40. The original notification date is unknown.
Latvia	Road Traffic Safety Directorate	Road Traffic Safety Directorate	25 June 2014		UNECE document communicating Latvia's acceptance of Resolution No. 40.
Lithuania	Lithuanian Transport Safety Administration	Lithuanian Transport Safety Administration; Lithuanian Yachting Union	6 August 2002		UNECE status report showing Resolution No. 40 as applied by Lithuania. The original notification date is unknown.
Luxembourg	Commissariat aux Affaires Maritimes	Commissariat aux Affaires Maritimes	6 August 2002		UNECE status report showing Resolution No. 40 as applied by Luxembourg. The original notification date is unknown.
Netherlands	Central Bureau for Driving Licences (Centraal Bureau Rijvaardigheidsbewijzen (CBR))	Central Bureau for Driving Licences (Centraal Bureau Rijvaardigheidsbewijzen (CBR)); Netherlands Royal Touring Federation (Koninklijke Nederlandse Toeristenbond) (ANWB); Netherlands Royal Water Sports Federation (Koninklijk Nederlands Watersport Verbond) (KNWV); Netherlands Royal Power-Boat Federation (Koninklijke Nederlandsche Motorboot Club) (KNMC); Netherlands Water-Ski Federation (Nederlandse Waterskibond) (NWB)	6 August 2002		UNECE status report showing Resolution No. 40 as applied by the Netherlands. The original notification date is unknown.
Norway	Norwegian Maritime Authority (Sjøfartsdirektoratet)	Norsk Test AS	1 January 2012		Effective date. The UNECE Working Party report states that Norway informed it of its acceptance of Resolution No. 40 from 1 January 2012. Norway's acceptance decision was documented separately by UNECE in 2011.
Romania	Romanian Naval Authority (Autoritatea Navală Română)	Romanian Naval Authority	26 June 2007		National implementation date. UNECE states that Resolution No. 40 was implemented through Order No. 534 of 26 June 2007, governing training and the issuance of international certificates for pleasure-craft operators.
Serbia	Ministry of Construction, Transport and Infrastructure of the Republic of Serbia	Harbour Master Office, Belgrade	5 November 2015		UNECE document on the application of Resolution No. 40, transmitted by the Government of Serbia. The original notification date is unknown.
Slovakia	Transport Authority (Dopravný úrad)	Transport Authority, Inland Navigation Department	6 August 2002		UNECE status report showing Resolution No. 40 as applied by Slovakia. The original notification date is unknown.
South Africa	South African Maritime Safety Authority (SAMSA)	South African Maritime Safety Authority (SAMSA); South African Sailing	31 May 2011		Formal notification date. UNECE records that, by a letter dated 31 May 2011, the South African Maritime Safety Authority informed the UNECE Executive Secretary of South Africa's acceptance of Resolution No. 40.
Switzerland	Federal Transport Office (Office fédéral des transports (OFT)); Cantonal offices of road traffic and navigation; Swiss Cruising Club (Cruising Club de Suisse (CCS)); Association of Swiss Boating Schools (Association des Écoles Nautiques Suisses (AENS))	Federal Transport Office (Office fédéral des transports (OFT)); Regional cantonal offices of road traffic and navigation; Swiss Cruising Club (Cruising Club de Suisse (CCS)); Swiss Yachting Association (SYA)	1 December 2007		Effective or application date. UNECE states that Resolution No. 40 has been applied in Switzerland since 1 December 2007, following amendment of article 91 of the Swiss inland-navigation ordinance.
Ukraine	State Service of Ukraine for Transport Safety (Ukrtransbezpeka)	State Service of Ukraine for Transport Safety (Ukrtransbezpeka)	30 August 2018		UNECE document listing Ukraine among the States that had formally accepted Resolution No. 40. The document reports the formal-acceptance list as of September 2018. The original notification date is unknown.
United Kingdom	Maritime and Coastguard Agency (MCA)	Royal Yachting Association (RYA); British Water Ski and Wakeboard; International Yachtmaster Training; British Sub-Aqua Club	6 August 2002		UNECE record expressly stating that the United Kingdom accepts Resolution No. 40.

=== Application of Resolution 14 ===
The following UNECE member states continue to apply the earlier Resolution 14:

- France
- Italy
- Poland

=== States applying neither resolution ===
The following 32 UNECE member states are not listed as applying either Resolution 40 or Resolution 14.

==== States with direct territorial access to the sea ====
- Albania
- Bosnia and Herzegovina
- Canada
- Cyprus
- Denmark
- Estonia
- (Georgia (country)) Georgia
- Greece
- Iceland
- Israel
- Malta
- Monaco
- Montenegro
- Portugal
- Russia
- Slovenia
- Spain
- Sweden
- Turkey
- United States

==== States bordering only the Caspian Sea ====
- Azerbaijan
- Kazakhstan
- Turkmenistan

Although these states border the Caspian Sea, the United Nations classifies all three as landlocked developing countries.

==== States without direct territorial access to the sea ====
- Andorra
- Armenia
- Kyrgyzstan
- Liechtenstein
- Moldova
- North Macedonia
- San Marino
- Tajikistan
- Uzbekistan

== Individual states ==
=== Finland ===
Finland has adopted the resolution but does not require the ICC for normal yachts ("sufficient age and skill" is enough) and does not use CEVNI for its inland waters.

Some official and some quality assured non-official certificates (mainly the coastal master certificates of the navigation association and the scouts) are regarded as fulfilling knowledge requirements of ICC for coastal waters. Courses for the CEVNI part are arranged separately by many organisations. The certificate itself is issued by the authorities, usually based on such documents.

The ICC is required for masters of boats chartered for international voyages (in addition to a domestic certificate) and for masters of recreational vessels with a length of more than 24 metres.

=== Ireland ===
The Irish Sailing Association is uniquely authorized by the Irish Department of Transport to issue ICC's to only Irish Citizens. Holders of the ICC license are able to operate recreational vessels for recreational use in European waters where an ICC is required, and proves to local authorities that the skipper has the required Irish qualifications for skippering the vessel.

=== United Kingdom ===
International Yacht Training Worldwide (IYT Worldwide), The Royal Yachting Association (RYA), and the British Sub-Aqua Club (BSAC) are with the authority of the Maritime and Coastguard Agency (MCA) approved to issue ICCs to those who meet the mandated requirements and the competency requirements.

ICC's are able to be issued by these Associations to citizens of Nations who are not signatories. In this manner, for example, USA citizens can gain the ICC. In the USA, NauticEd International Sailing Education facilitates the issuance of the ICC through the UK government via the Royal Yachting Association.

UK ICCs are for use on British registered vessels in the waters of foreign states that participate in Resolution 40, without the need to comply with those states’ national certification requirements. An ICC does not enable a British ICC holder to skipper a non-British registered vessel. If a British skipper wants to skipper a non-British registered vessel then he/she must be qualified per the regulations of the country in which the vessel is registered. (NOTE: The RYA home page makes no reference of this limitation https://www.rya.org.uk/membership/membership-benefits/international-certificate-of-competence)

The UK ICC was only available to British citizens or bona fide British residents. This has now been extended to cover other Nationals.

=== Estonia ===
Estonia requires operators of a small pleasure craft (2.5-24 m with 25 m^{2} sail area or 25 kW+ power) to have an International Certificate for Operators of Pleasure Craft. The Maritime Administration has licensed training institutions to carry through courses, based on which the Road Administration issues Certificates of Competence that conform to international standards.

== See also ==
- Code Européen des Voies de la Navigation Intérieure (European Code for Inland Waterways)
- List of certificates for operators of pleasure craft
