= Thomas Gray (surveyor) =

Thomas Gray, C.B. (1832–1890), entered into the British Board of Trade as a boy clerk in 1851, becoming Head of the Maritime Department by 1869, a position he held for over 20 years, becoming deeply interested in everything related to ships and seafaring.

In 1867, as assistant secretary, he wrote a pamphlet entitled "The Rule of the Road" also known as "The Rules in Rhyme", which became famous for its well-known mnemonic verses. e.g.

Aids to Memory in Four Verses

(1.) Two Steam Ships meeting.

When both side-lights you see ahead —
Port your helm and show your RED.

(2.) Two Steam Ships passing.

GREEN to GREEN – or, RED to RED —
Perfect safety – go ahead!

(3.) Two Steam Ships crossing.

Note. – This is the position of greatest danger; there is nothing for it but good look-out, caution and judgment.

If to your starboard RED appear,
It is your duty to keep clear;
To act as judgment says is proper;
To Port – or Starboard – Back – or Stop her!
But when upon your Port is seen
A Steamer's Starboard Light of GREEN,
There's not so much for you to do,
For GREEN to Port keeps clear of you.

(4.) All Ships must keep a good look-out, and Steam Ships must stop and go astern, if necessary.

Both in safety and in doubt
Always keep a good look-out;
In danger, with no room to turn,
Ease her, Stop her, Go astern.

— Gray, Rule of the Road at Sea, 1867

According to Charles Dickens, Jr., Thomas Gray either owned or at the very least operated a little steam launch going by the name of Midge as a hobby.

"Midge." – A handsome little steam launch, a special hobby of Mr. Thomas Gray, of the Board of Trade, and constantly employed, under the able command of Captain Pitman, R.N., in the suppression of crimps and lodging-house "runners," the two most rapacious and venomous descriptions of vermin by which the Jack of other days was preyed upon. The Midge also, under a recent provision, boards all homeward-bound vessels on their way up the river, and offers to any of the crew who may be desirous of proceeding straight home without waiting for their pay, a ticket to the desired destination, with a sufficient advance to sustain them on the way, the balance of their wages being sent after them from the Merchant Shipping Office in the East India-Road. The Midge's headquarters are at Gravesend, where is also a branch Merchant Shipping Office, of which Captain Pitman is the superintendent. The Midge is one of the smartest little craft upon the river, and is certainly one of Jack's best and most practical friends.

— Charles Dickens, Jr., Dicken's Dictionary of the Thames, 1881

A variant of this poem was featured in "The Donkeyman's Widow" by Guy Gilpatric, a Glencannon story which appeared in the Saturday Evening Post, 29 January 1938.

He died at his home in Stockwell on 15 March 1890 and was buried at West Norwood Cemetery.

== Memorial trust ==
The Marine Society awards medals each year to recognise "deeds of professional merit" in relation to any aspect of seafaring.

== Bibliography ==
- Gray, Thomas (1867) [1867], The Rule of the Road, Expanded and re-published as Observations on the rule of the road at sea, 1878, Board of Transport: Marine Department
- Gray, Thomas (1870), Notice to Masters, Board of Transport: Marine Department, Libraries Australia ID: 3854335
- Gray, Thomas (1878) [1867], Observations on the rule of the road at sea (2nd ed.), J.D. Potter, C. Wilson, Kent & Co., Pewtress & Co, p. 85, ASIN B0008CBTPU
- Gray, Thomas (1884) [1867], Observations on the rule of the road at sea. Prepared and dedicated to Officers and seamen of the mercantile marine. (4th ed.), Pewtress & Co. (&c. &c.), p. 112, ASIN B00088B11G
