= International Regulations for Preventing Collisions at Sea =

Rules of maritime navigation

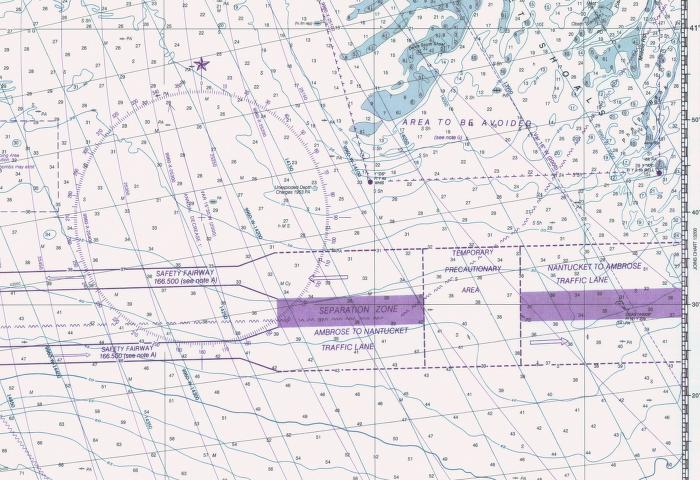
Trafic separation scheme

The International Regulations for Preventing Collisions at Sea 1972, also known as Collision Regulations (COLREG), are published by the International Maritime Organization (IMO) and set out, among other things, the "rules of the road" or navigation rules to be followed by ships and other vessels at sea to prevent collisions between two or more vessels. COLREG can also refer to the specific political line that divides inland waterways, which are subject to their own navigation rules, and coastal waterways which are subject to international navigation rules. They are derived from a multilateral treaty called the Convention on the International Regulations for Preventing Collisions at Sea, also known as Collision Regulations of 1960.

Although rules for navigating vessels inland may differ, the international rules specify that they should be as closely in line with the international rules as possible. In most of continental Europe, the Code Européen des Voies de la Navigation Intérieure (CEVNI, or the European Code for Navigation on Inland Waters) apply. In the United States, the rules for vessels navigating inland are published alongside the international rules.

== Organization of the regulatory documents ==
As of 2022, there are 41 Rules and four annexes in COLREGs Rules in force.

=== PART A - GENERAL ===
Rule 1 - Application. This rule states that the COLREGs should be complied with by all vessels on the "high seas".

Rule 2 – Responsibility. This rule allows Master mariners and other persons in charge of vessels to depart from the rules to "avoid immediate danger", provided there are special circumstances for doing so. The rule also effectively requires all navigators to exercise good seamanship in applying the rules.

Rule 3 – General Definitions. This rule sets out key definitions that apply to terms in the rest of the rules, including definitions for 'power-driven vessels', 'sailing vessels' and other terms such as 'not under command' and 'vessel restricted in her ability to manoeuvre.

=== PART B - Section I Conduct of Vessels in any Condition of Visibility ===
Rule 4 – Application. This rule states that the rules in this section apply to all vessels in any condition of visibility.

Rule 5 – Look-out. This rule concerns the keeping of a proper lookout to sea. It involves keeping the lookout by all available means, including audible means, visual means and by the use of marine radar.

Rule 6 – Safe Speed. This rule sets out a requirement for all vessels to proceed at a safe speed with reference to the prevailing circumstances and conditions. Relevant circumstances include, for example, the state of visibility, the presence of other ships (traffic), as well as the draught and manoeuvrability of the mariner's own ship.

Rule 7 – Risk of Collision. This rule requires all vessels to use all available means to determine if a risk of collision exists. These include the proper use of marine radar and the taking of bearings by ship's compass to determine if there is a steady bearing and risk of collision.

Rule 8 – Action to Avoid Collision. This rule sets out requirements for vessels to alter course and/or speed to pass a safe distance with other vessels. It requires alterations to be consistent with the concept of good seamanship, as well as be sufficient to be observed by the other vessel, i.e., a large and bold angle of course alteration. The rule is designed to work in operation with other rules, including Rules 16 and 17.

Rule 9 – Narrow Channels. This rule concerns those vessels keeping a course within narrow channels and fairways. It requires vessels less than 20 metres in length, fishing vessels and sailing vessels to not impede the passage of larger vessels in the narrow channel. It also gives reference to signals (sound and light) that can be given to allow vessels to overtake one another if following the narrow channel or fairway, as well as a separate signal when approaching a bend. Vessels are also not allowed to anchor unless there are legitimate circumstances for doing so.

Rule 10 – Traffic Separation Schemes. Typically abbreviated to TSS by mariners, these schemes aim to promote the safety of navigation by ensuring ships follow a general direction of travel within defined traffic lanes. The TSS lanes are shown on paper and electronic charts and by monitoring their position, a ship can determine their navigation within the scheme. Additionally, a TSS provides separation zones and inshore-traffic zones, to which restrictions apply. Additional restrictions also apply to some vessel types, such as fishing vessels and vessels less than 20m in length to not impede the safe passage of other/larger vessels.

=== PART B - Section II Conduct of Vessels in Sight of One Another ===
Rule 11 - Application

Rule 12 – Sailing Vessels. The rule details how two or more sailing vessels should give way to each other when meeting. This is based on the wind direction. When each sailing vessel has the wind on a different side, the vessel which has the wind on the port side should keep out of the way of the other. Alternatively when both sailing vessels have the wind on the same side, the vessel which is to windward should keep out of the way of the vessel which is to leeward. Finally, if a vessel with the wind on the port side sees a vessel to windward and cannot determine with certainty whether the other vessel has the wind on her port or starboard side, they should keep out of the way of the other, i.e. they take action to make the situation safe regardless of knowing for sure the wind situation of the other vessel.

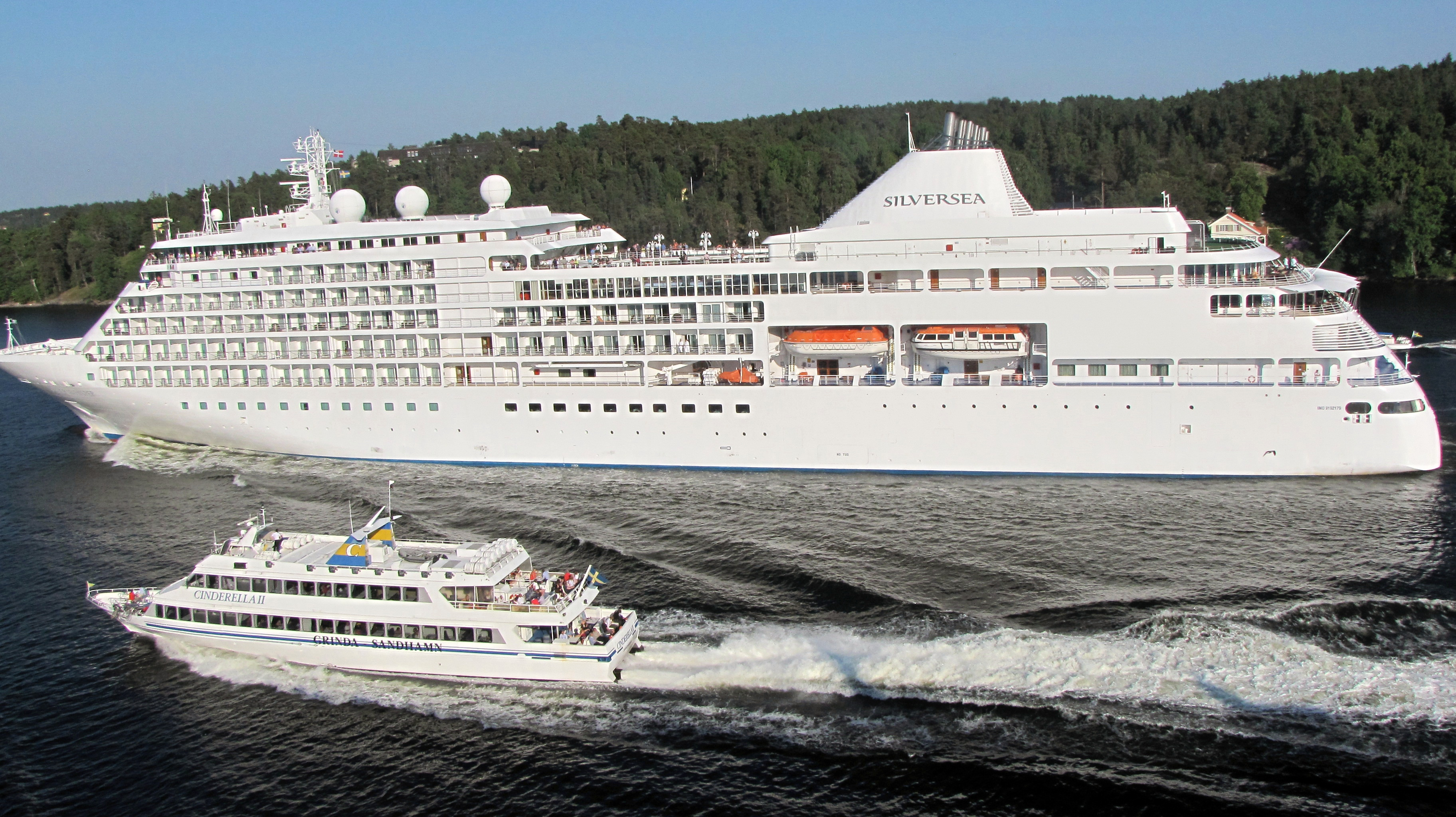
Rule 13 covers overtaking situations between vessels

Rule 13 – Overtaking. This rule governs overtaking situations between different vessels. The primary requirement is that for all overtaking vessels, they must keep clear of the vessels they are overtaking. For sailing vessels Rule 13 also takes precedence over rules 12 and 18 meaning the overtaking sailing vessel must keep clear.

Rule 14 – Head-on Situation. This rule requires power-driven vessels that meet head-on i.e. bow directly facing another bow, to both alter course to starboard so as to pass clear of each other. This is referred to as passing 'port to port' as the port sides separate away from each other as vessels alter. The rule effectively assigns equal responsibility to vessels to prevent collision.

Rule 15 – Crossing Situation. This rule concerns actions for vessels in crossing situations and essentially requires a vessel that has another vessel on their starboard (right hand) side to stay out of the way of the other, becoming the give way vessel under rule 17. The other vessel is required to stand-on under rule 17. Also, if the circumstances of the case admit, the vessel that has the other on their starboard side should avoid crossing ahead of the other vessel.

Rule 16 – Action by Give-way Vessel. This rule requires the give-way vessel to take early and substantial action to keep well clear of the other vessel.

Rule 17 – Action by Stand-on Vessel. Rule 17 requires the stand-on vessel to maintain their course and speed. However, if it appears that the other vessel who is required to give way is not taking action, then they may take action to avoid collision according to certain requirements having been met.

Rule 18 – Responsibilities Between Vessels. Rule 18 effectively establishes an order of priority between all vessels and modes of operation of those vessels. For power-driven vessels operating normally, these types of vessels are required to keep clear of all other vessels, including sailing and fishing vessels. However, where vessels are subject to restrictions such as not under command, constrained by draft or restricted in their ability manoeuvre, then other vessels, including other power-driven vessels, sailing vessels and fishing vessels are either required to keep out of the way or not impede their passage, depending on the requirements.

=== PART B - Section III Conduct of Vessels in Restricted Visibility ===
Rule 19 – Conduct of Vessels in Restricted Visibility. This rule governs collision avoidance for vessels not in sight of another when navigating in or near an area of restricted visibility. Causes include fog, smoke and other phenomena such as heavy precipitation. The rule requires all vessels to proceed at a safe speed adapted to the conditions and to effectively take action to avoid collision in ample time. As far as possible, vessels should avoid altering to port for vessels forward of their beam unless being overtaken and avoid altering course towards a vessel abeam or abaft the beam. For ships that have heard another vessels sound signal but not observed them on radar, part e requires the ship to reduce speed to the minimum required to maintain their course and if necessary to take all way off.

=== PART C - Lights and Shapes ===
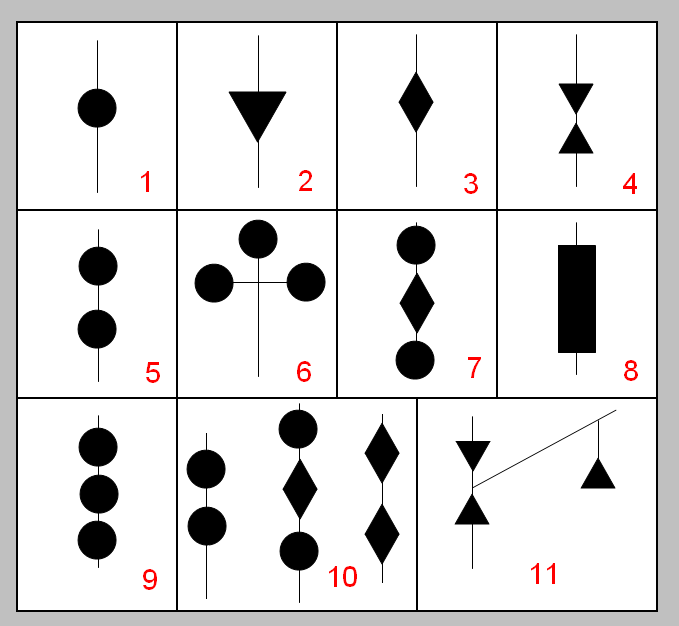
Vessel shapes under the COLREGs

Rule 20 – Application

Rule 21 – Definitions

Rule 22 – Visibility of Lights. The minimum visible distance requirements of navigational lights are detailed under this rule. These vary according to the length of the vessel. For example, for vessels greater than 50 metres in length, the visibility ranges of lights are 6 miles for masthead lights, 3 miles for sidelights, 3 miles for the sternlight, 3 miles for towing lights and 3 miles for an all round light.

Rule 23 – Power-driven Vessels Underway

Rule 24 – Towing and Pushing

Rule 25 – Sailing Vessels Underway and Vessels Under Oars

Rule 26 – Fishing Vessels

Rule 27 – Vessels Not Under Command or Restricted in their Ability to Manoeuvre

Rule 28 – Vessels Constrained by their Draught

Rule 29 – Pilot Vessels

Rule 30 – Anchored Vessels and Vessels Aground

Rule 31 – Seaplanes

=== PART D - Sound and Light Signals ===
Rule 32 – Definitions

Rule 33 – Equipment for Sound Signals

Rule 34 – Manoeuvring and Warning Signals

Rule 35 - Sound Signals in Restricted Visibility

Rule 36 - Signals to Attract Attention

Rule 37 - Distress Signals

PART E - Exemptions

Rule 38 - Exemptions

PART F - Verification of Compliance with the Provisions of the Convention

Rule 39 - Definitions

Rule 40 - Application

Rule 41 - Verification of Compliance

=== Annexes ===
ANNEX I - Positioning and Technical Details of Lights and Shapes

ANNEX II Addition Signals for Fishing Vessels Fishing in Close Proximity

ANNEX III : Technical Details of Sound Signal Appliances

ANNEX IV Distress Signals. The annex lists the official international distress signals. These include signals such as the spoken word "Mayday", the Code flag Signal "N.C. (November Charlie)", flares showing red lights, "SOS" in morse code", an orange smoke signal and others.

== History ==
Prior to the development of a single set of international rules and practices, separate practices and various conventions and informal procedures existed in different parts of the world. As a result, there were inconsistencies and contradictions between navigation lights that gave rise to unintended collisions, including not least that many sailing vessels did not display navigation lights. Vessel navigation lights for operating in darkness as well as navigation marks were also not standardised, giving rise to dangerous confusion and ambiguity between vessels resulting in collisions and groundings.

With the advent of steam-powered ships in the mid-19th century, conventions for sailing vessel navigation had to be supplemented with conventions for power-driven vessel navigation. Sailing vessels are limited as to their manoeuvrability in that they cannot sail directly into the wind and are limited in the absence of wind. On the other hand, ships propelled by machinery can manoeuvre in all 360 degrees of direction and therefore can be manoeuvred irrespective of the wind conditions.

In 1840 in London, Trinity House drew up a set of regulations which were enacted by Parliament in 1846. The Trinity House rules were included in the Steam Navigation Act 1846, and the Admiralty regulations regarding lights for steam ships were included in this statute in 1848. In 1849 Congress extended the light requirements to sailing vessels on US waters. In the UK in 1858 coloured sidelights were recommended for sailing vessels and fog signals were required to be given, by steam vessels on the ship's whistle and by sailing vessels on the fog horn or bell, while a separate but similar action was also taken in the United States as by 1850 onwards, English maritime law on collisions was being gradually adopted in United States law. (Note: "Among the nautical rules applicable to the navigation of sailing vessels are the following, viz.: A vessel that has the wind free or sailing before or with the wind must get out of the way of the vessel that is close-hauled, or sailing by or against it and the vessel on the starboard tack has a right to keep her course, and the one on the larboard tack must give way or be answerable for the consequences. So when two vessels are approaching each other, both having the wind free and consequently the power of readily controlling their movements, the vessel on the larboard tack must give way and each pass to the right. The same rule governs vessels sailing on the wind and approaching each other when it is doubtful which is to windward. But if the vessel on the larboard tack is so far to windward that if both persist in their course, the other will strike her on the lee side abaft the beam or near the stern, in that case the vessel on the starboard tack should give way, as she can do so with greater facility and less loss of time and distance than the other. Again, when vessels are crossing each other in opposite directions and there is the least doubt of their going clear, the vessel on the starboard tack should persevere in her course, while that on the larboard tack should bear up, or keep away before the wind. ... no one can look through the reports in admiralty in England without being struck with the steadiness and rigor with which these general nautical rules have been enforced in cases of collision, under the advice of the Trinity Masters of that court, or fail to be impressed with the justice and propriety of such application and the salutary results flowing from it." [emphasis added]) Also in 1850, courts in the England and the United States adopted common law pertaining to reasonable speed within the Assured Clear Distance Ahead. (Note: “Whether any given rate is dangerous or not must depend upon the circumstances of each individual case, as the state of the weather, locality, and other similar facts.”) (Note: “At whatever rate she (the steamer) was going, if going at such a rate as made it dangerous to any craft which she ought to have seen, and might have seen, she had no right to go at that rate. ... at all events, she was bound to stop if it was necessary to do so, in order to prevent damage being done ...”) (Note: "It may be a matter of convenience that steam vessels should proceed with great rapidity, but the law will not justify them in proceeding with such rapidity if the property and lives of other persons are thereby endangered. ... It is a mistake to suppose that a rigorous enforcement of the necessity of adopting precautionary measures by the persons in charge of steamboats to avoid damage to sailing vessels on our rivers and internal waters will have the effect to produce carelessness and neglect on the part of the persons in charge of the latter. The vast speed and power of the former, and consequent serious damage to the latter in case of a collision, will always be found a sufficient admonition to care and vigilance on their part. A collision usually results in the destruction of the sailing vessel, and not unfrequently in the loss of the lives of persons on board.")

In 1863 a new set of rules drawn up by the British Board of Trade, in consultation with the French government, came into force. By 1864 the regulations (or Articles) had been adopted by more than thirty maritime countries, including Germany and the United States (passed by the United States Congress as Rules to prevent Collisions at Sea. An act fixing certain rules and regulations for preventing collisions on the water. 29 April 1864, ch. 69. and signed into law by President Abraham Lincoln). International regulations would continue to be further developed over the next several decades as a result of legislative and government action by the UK, US and other maritime States. For example, in 1867, Thomas Gray, assistant secretary to the Maritime Department of the Board of Trade, wrote The Rule of the Road, a pamphlet that became famous for its well-known mnemonic verses. Furthermore, in 1878, the United States codified its common law rules for reducing the risk of collisions. (Note: "Rule twenty-one. Every steam-vessel, when approaching another vessel, so as to involve risk of collision, shall slacken her speed, or, if necessary, stop and reverse: and every steam-vessel shall, when in a fog, go at a moderate speed...") By 1880, the 1863 international Articles were supplemented with whistle signals and in 1884 a new set of international regulations was implemented.

In 1889, the United States convened the first international maritime conference in Washington, D.C to further codify international collision regulations, including requirements for lights and shapes. The resulting rules were adopted in 1890 and effected in 1897. Some minor changes were made during the 1910 Brussels Maritime Conference and some rule changes were proposed, but never ratified, at the 1929 International Conference on Safety of Life at Sea (S.O.L.A.S.) With the recommendation that the direction of a turn be referenced by the rudder instead of the helm or tiller being informally agreed by all maritime nations in 1935.

The 1948 S.O.L.A.S. International Conference made several recommendations, including the recognition of radar; these were eventually ratified in 1952 and became effective in 1954. Further recommendations were made by a SOLAS Conference in London in 1960 which became effective in 1965.

=== The 1972 International Regulations for Preventing Collisions at Sea ===
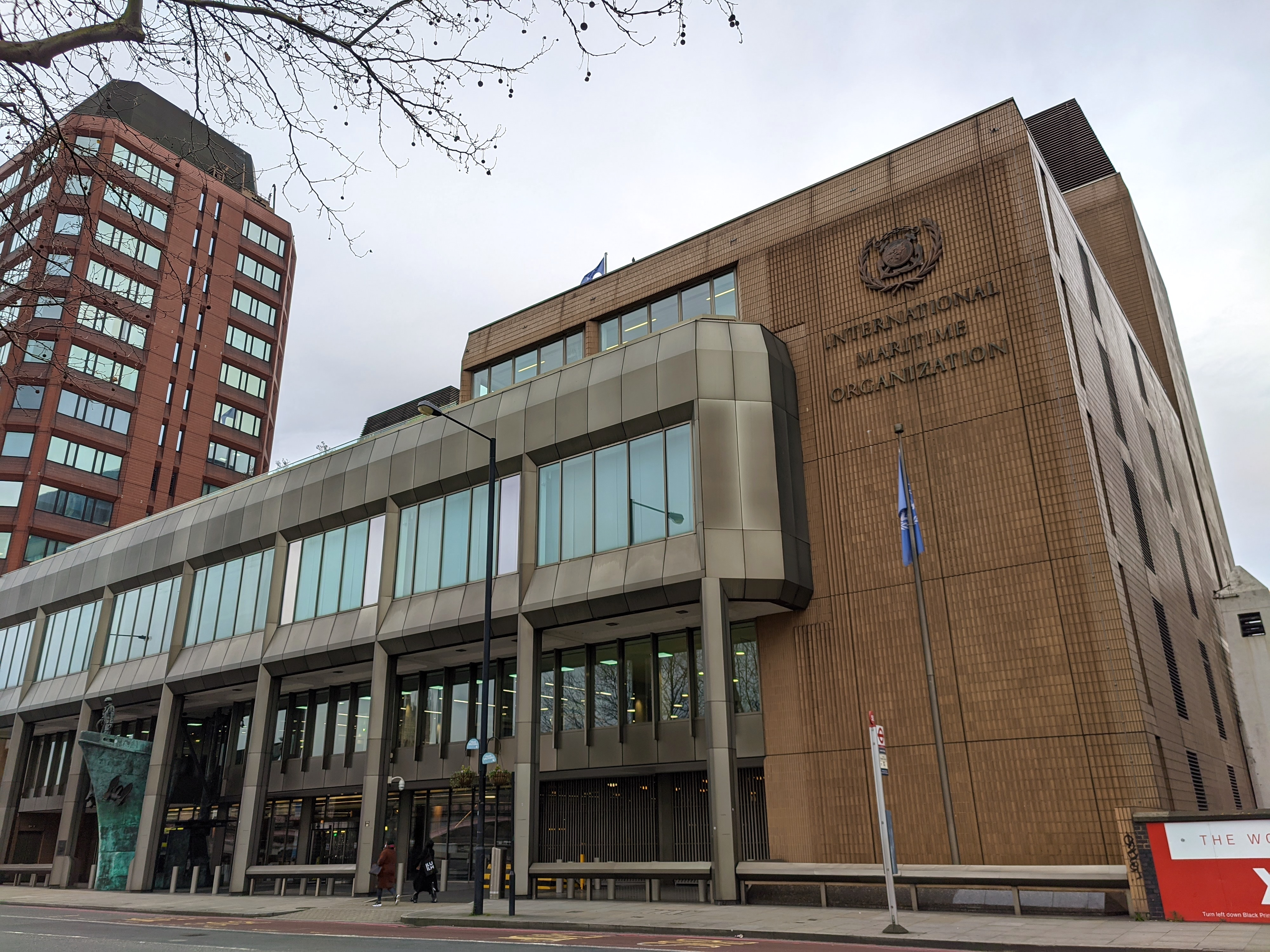
The International Maritime Organization Headquarters building, where amendments to the regulations are discussed and adopted

The International Regulations for Preventing Collisions at Sea were adopted as a convention of the International Maritime Organization on 20 October 1972 and entered into force on 15 July 1977. They were designed to update and replace the Collision Regulations of 1960, particularly with regard to Traffic Separation Schemes (TSS) following the first of these, introduced in the Strait of Dover in 1967. As of June 2013, the convention has been ratified by 155 states representing 98.7% of the tonnage of the world's merchant fleets.

The international regulations have been amended several times since their first adoption. In 1981 Rule 10 was amended with regard to dredging or surveying in traffic separation schemes. In 1987 amendments were made to several rules, including rule 1(e) for vessels of special construction; rule 3(h), vessels constrained by her draught and Rule 10(c), crossing traffic lanes. In 1989 Rule 10 was altered to stop unnecessary use of the inshore traffic zones associated with Traffic Separation Schemes (TSS). In 1993 amendments were made concerning the positioning of lights on vessels. In 2001 new rules were added relating to wing-in-ground-effect (WIG) craft and in 2007 the text of Annex IV (Distress signals) was rewritten.

The 2013 amendments (resolution A.1085(28)) Adoption: 4 December 2013 Entry into force: 1 January 2016 After existing part E (Exemptions), a new part F (Verification of compliance with the provisions of the convention) is added in order for the Organization to make necessary verifications under the IMO Member State Audit Scheme.

== Jurisdictions ==
The International Maritime Organization (IMO) convention, including the almost four dozen "rules" contained in the international regulations, must be adopted by each member country that is signatory to the convention—COLREG laws must exist within each jurisdiction. Thereafter, each IMO member country must designate an "administration"—national authority or agency—for implementing the provisions of the COLREG convention, as it applies to vessels over which the national authority has jurisdiction. Individual governing bodies must pass legislation to establish or assign such authority, as well as to create national navigation laws (and subsequent specific regulations) which conform to the international convention; each national administration is thereafter responsible for the implementation and enforcement of the regulations as it applies to ships and vessels under its legal authority. As well, administrations are typically empowered to enact modifications that apply to vessels in waters under the national jurisdiction concerned, provided that any such modifications are not inconsistent with the COLREGs.

=== Canada ===
The Canadian version of the COLREGs is provided by Transport Canada, which regulates Canadian vessels.

=== Korea ===
South Korea ratified the COLREGs in 1977 and enacted enforcing legislation under the 1986 Korea Marine Traffic Safety Act.

=== Marshall Islands ===
For Marshall Islands waters and ships, Chapter 22.11.4 requires all vessels to comply with the 1972 COLREGs, as amended. Section 150 of the Maritime Act encompasses the fitting and provision of navigation lights, shapes and sound signalling equipment.

=== Singapore ===
The version of the COLREGs applicable to the territorial waters of Singapore is the Merchant Shipping (Prevention of Collisions at Sea) Regulations. These Rules were enacted by Singapore in 1983 and then revised and reissued 25 March 1992.

=== United Kingdom ===
The UK version of the COLREGs is provided by the Maritime and Coastguard Agency (MCA), in the Merchant Shipping (Distress Signals and Prevention of Collisions) Regulations of 1996. They are distributed and accessed in the form of a "Merchant Shipping Notice" (MSN), which is used to convey mandatory information that must be complied with under UK legislation. These MSNs relate to Statutory Instruments and contain the technical detail of such regulations. Material published by the MCA is subject to Crown copyright protection, but the MCA allows it to be reproduced free of charge in any format or medium for research or private study, provided it is reproduced accurately and not used in a misleading context.

=== United States ===
The US version of the COLREGs is provided by the United States Coast Guard of the US Department of Homeland Security.

== No right-of-way ==
A commonly held misconception concerning the rules of marine navigation is that by following specific rules, a vessel can gain certain rights of way over other vessels. No vessel ever has "right of way" over other vessels. Rather, there can be a "give way" vessel and a "stand on" vessel, or there may be two give way vessels with no stand on vessel. A stand on vessel does not have any right of way over any give way vessel, and is not free to maneuver however it wishes, but is obliged to keep a constant course and speed (so as to help the give way vessel in determining a safe course). So standing on is an obligation, not a right, and is not a privilege. Furthermore, a stand on vessel may still be obliged (under Rule 2 and Rule 17) to give way itself, in particular when a situation has arisen where a collision can no longer be avoided by actions of the give way vessel alone. For example, two power-driven vessels approaching each other head-to-head, are both deemed to be "give way" and both are required to alter course so as to avoid colliding with the other. Neither vessel has "right of way".

== Future ==
In recent years, the IMO, States and other interested parties have assessed the COLREGs with a view to potential future amendment to facilitate Maritime Autonomous Surface Ships. These include a regulatory scoping exercise to review the applicability of the COLREGs for autonomous ships.

== Racing Rules ==
The Racing Rules of Sailing, which govern the conduct of yacht and dinghy racing under the sanction of national sailing authorities which are members of World Sailing, are based on the COLREGs, but differ in some important matters such as overtaking and right of way close to turning marks in competitive sailing.

== See also ==
- Assured Clear Distance Ahead
- Brussels Collision Convention
- Navigation
- Navigational aid
- Pilotage
- Sea mark
