= Garrick's Temple to Shakespeare =

Garden folly in London

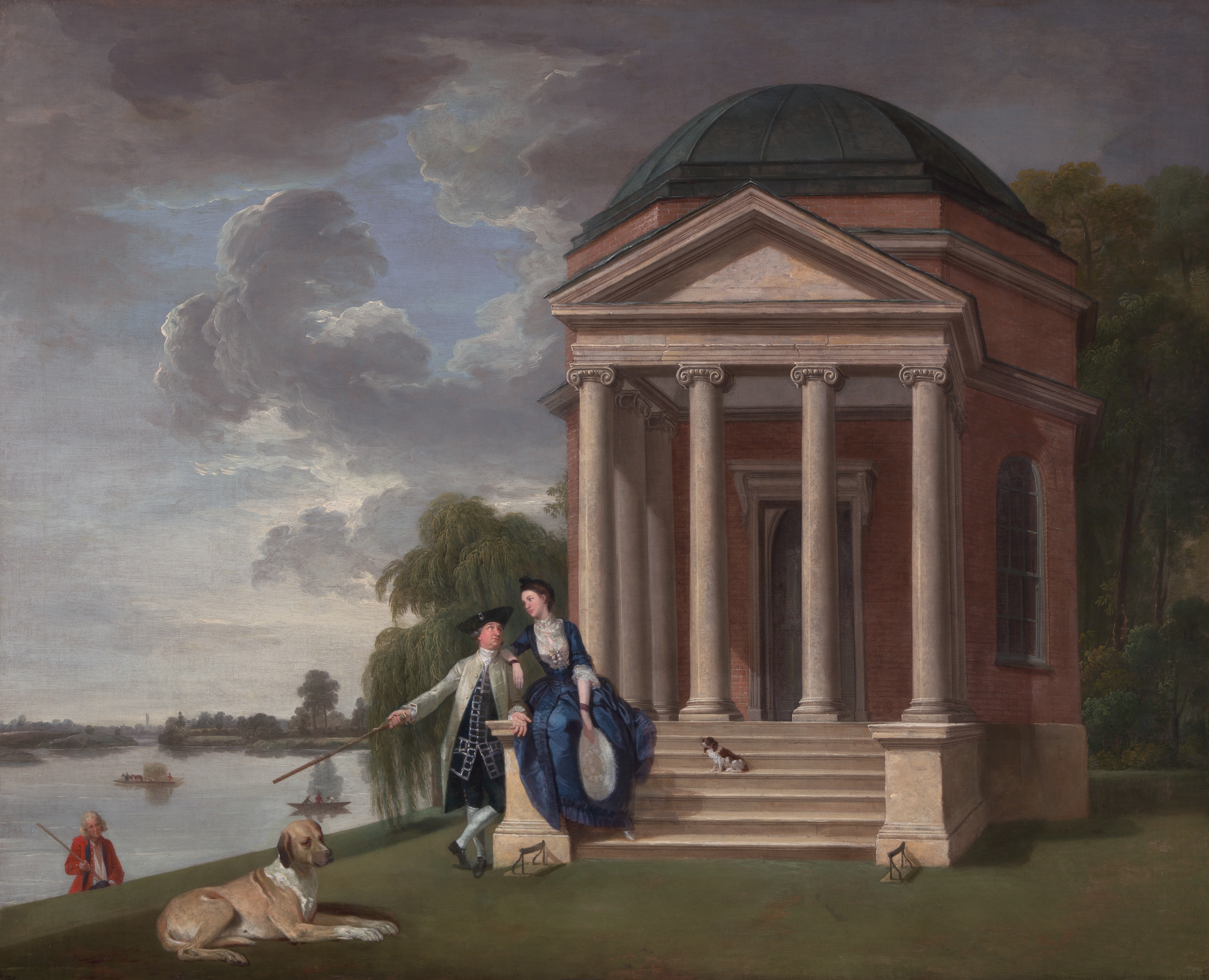
- David Garrick and his Wife by his Temple to Shakespeare at Hampton, Johan Zoffany, c. 1762
- Interactive map of Garrick's Temple to Shakespeare
- Location: Hampton, London
- Coordinates: 51°24′45″N 0°21′34″W
- Type: Folly
- Material: Brick
- Beginning date: 1755
- Completion date: 1756
- Dedicated to: William Shakespeare

Designations

Listed Building – Grade I
- Official name: Garrick's Shakespeare Temple
- Designated: 2 September 1952
- Reference no.: 1065456

Garrick's Temple to Shakespeare is a small garden folly erected in 1756 on the north bank of the River Thames at Hampton in the London Borough of Richmond upon Thames. Grade I listed, it was built by the actor David Garrick to honour the playwright William Shakespeare, whose plays Garrick performed to great acclaim throughout his career. During his lifetime Garrick used it to house his extensive collection of Shakespearean relics and for entertaining his family and guests. It passed through a succession of owners until coming into public ownership in the 1930s, but it had fallen into serious disrepair by the end of the 20th century. After a campaign supported by distinguished actors and donations from the National Lottery's "good causes" fund, it was restored in the late 1990s and reopened to the public as a museum and memorial to the life and career of Garrick. It is reputedly the world's only shrine to Shakespeare.

== Description ==
The temple is an octagonal domed building with a nod to the Pantheon, Rome, constructed in undecorated brick with a single east-facing entrance. It was built in the Classical style popularised by the Italian architect Palladio with an Ionic portico, four columns wide by three deep, flanking the entrance. Several steps lead up to the portico. Inside, glazed arched windows reaching to the ground face the river. A deep curved recess in the west wall provides room for a statue. Outside, a lawn and garden provide views over the Thames to the south.

== History ==
=== Construction ===
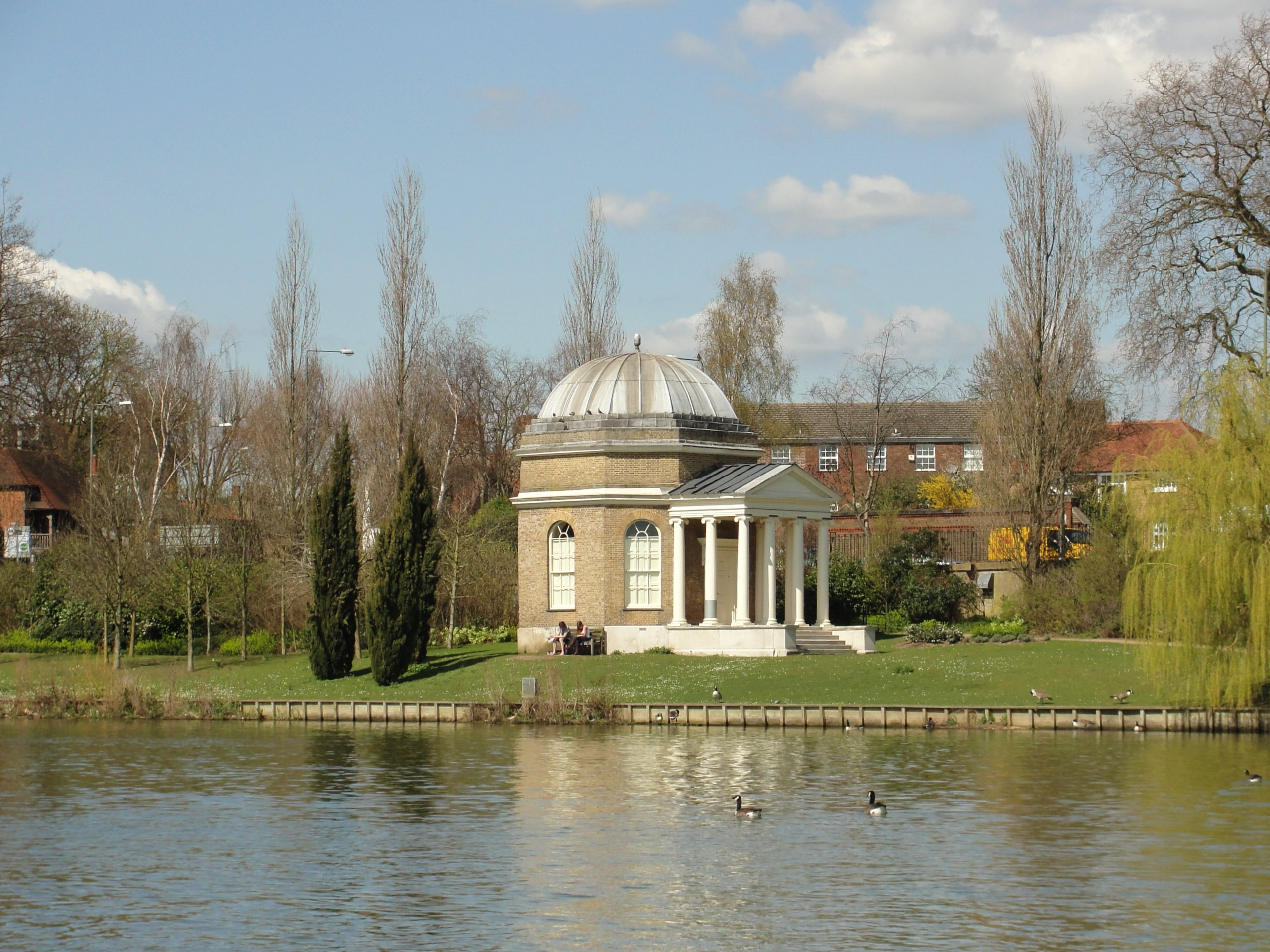
Garrick's Temple in its riverside setting

Garrick built the temple on land adjoining a villa that he had bought in October 1754 to serve as a country retreat. The villa's riverside garden, a plot now known as Garrick's Lawn, was separated from the main property by the road from Kingston upon Thames to Staines. Garrick commissioned the building of an elaborate grotto-tunnel under the road, illuminated by 500 lanterns, to facilitate private access to the lawn from the house.

At some point in 1755 he decided to build a summer-house by the riverside which he intended to dedicate to his muse Shakespeare as a "temple" to the playwright. The temple's architect is unknown as his decision to build it is not recorded in his own papers. Robert Adam and Lancelot "Capability" Brown have both been suggested as possibilities. An "Ionic Temple" of similar design stands in the gardens of Chiswick House a few miles away. This may well have been the inspiration for Garrick's Temple, as Garrick had spent his honeymoon at Chiswick House a few years earlier in the company of his wife's guardians the Burlingtons.

On 4 August 1755, his neighbour and friend Horace Walpole wrote to a correspondent: "I have contracted a sort of intimacy with Garrick, who is my neighbour. He affects to study my taste; I lay it all upon you – he admires you. He is building a graceful temple to Shakespeare: I offered him this motto: Quod spiro et placeo, si placeo tuum est [If I inspire and give pleasure, it is because of you]." A year later, Walpole wrote in another letter:

He has built a temple to his master Shakespear [sic], and I am going to adorn the outside, since his modesty would not let me decorate it within, as I proposed, with these mottos:

Quod spiro et placeo, si placeo, tuum est.
That I spirit have and nature,
That sense breaths in ev’ry feature
That I please, if please I do,
Shakespear, all I owe to you.

The garden in front of the temple was laid out in accordance with Garrick's friend William Hogarth's theory of the Line of Beauty. An S-shaped path ran between flowering shrubs in accordance with the theory's preference for serpentine shapes. Walpole donated a grove of Italian cypresses to plant in the garden. It was widely admired in its time and its idyllic prospect so moved Samuel Johnson that he told Garrick: "Ah, David, it is the leaving of such places that makes a deathbed so terrible."

=== Contents ===
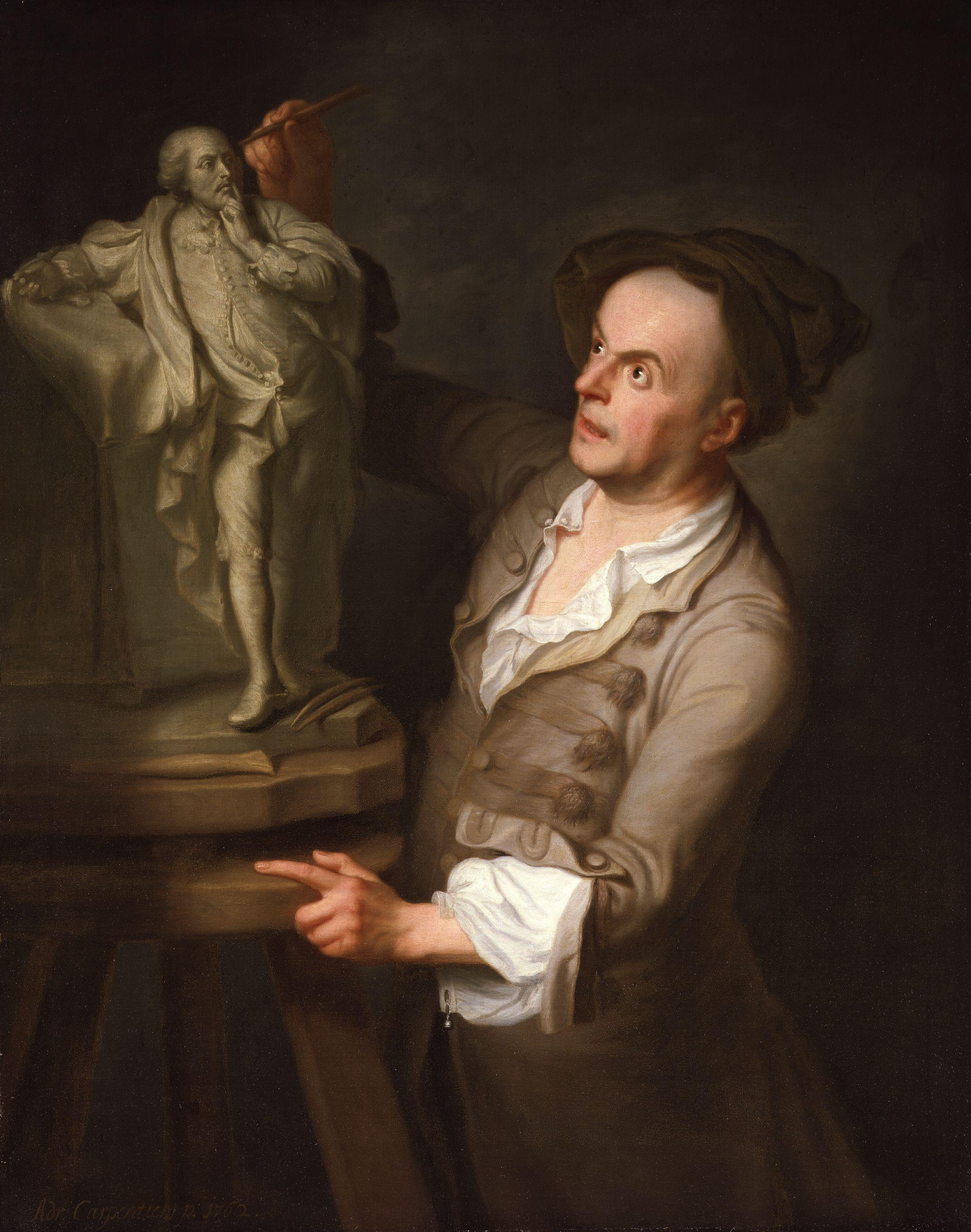
Adrien Carpentiers's portrait of the sculptor Louis-François Roubiliac depicts him with a model of the statue of Shakespeare for Garrick's temple.

The temple's interior was furnished as a shrine to Shakespeare. It was dominated by a statue of the playwright commissioned by Garrick from the French Huguenot sculptor Louis-François Roubiliac at a cost of 300 guineas (£315, equivalent to approximately £32,000 now). Roubiliac chose to model the statue on the Chandos portrait of Shakespeare while Garrick himself is said to have posed for the sculpture. Its appearance is rather more reminiscent of Garrick than Shakespeare; it is said that the actor struck a pose and exclaimed, "Lo, the Bard of Avon!" to illustrate how he wanted Shakespeare to be portrayed. The statue's head was not to Garrick's satisfaction, and Roubiliac had to replace it with another, carved from a different type of marble. During Garrick's lifetime the statue was displayed in the temple. On his death it was willed to the British Museum, where it was on display in the King's Library until 1998, when it was moved to the British Library. A copy of the statue, donated by the museum, is currently displayed in the temple.

Garrick exhibited his collection of Shakespeare relics in the temple, including a chair made from a mulberry tree which had supposedly been planted by Shakespeare in the grounds of New Place, his house at Stratford upon Avon. The chair was designed by Hogarth, according to Walpole, and had a medal of Shakespeare carved into its backrest. The chair survives and is today owned by the Folger Shakespeare Library in Washington, D.C. Other items on display included various personal effects of Shakespeare such as "an old leather glove, with pointed fingers and blackened metal embroidery", a dagger and "a signet ring with W.S. on it." The collection was sold and dispersed on the death of Garrick's widow; he had collected so much Shakespearean memorabilia that it took ten days to auction it all.

=== Usage ===
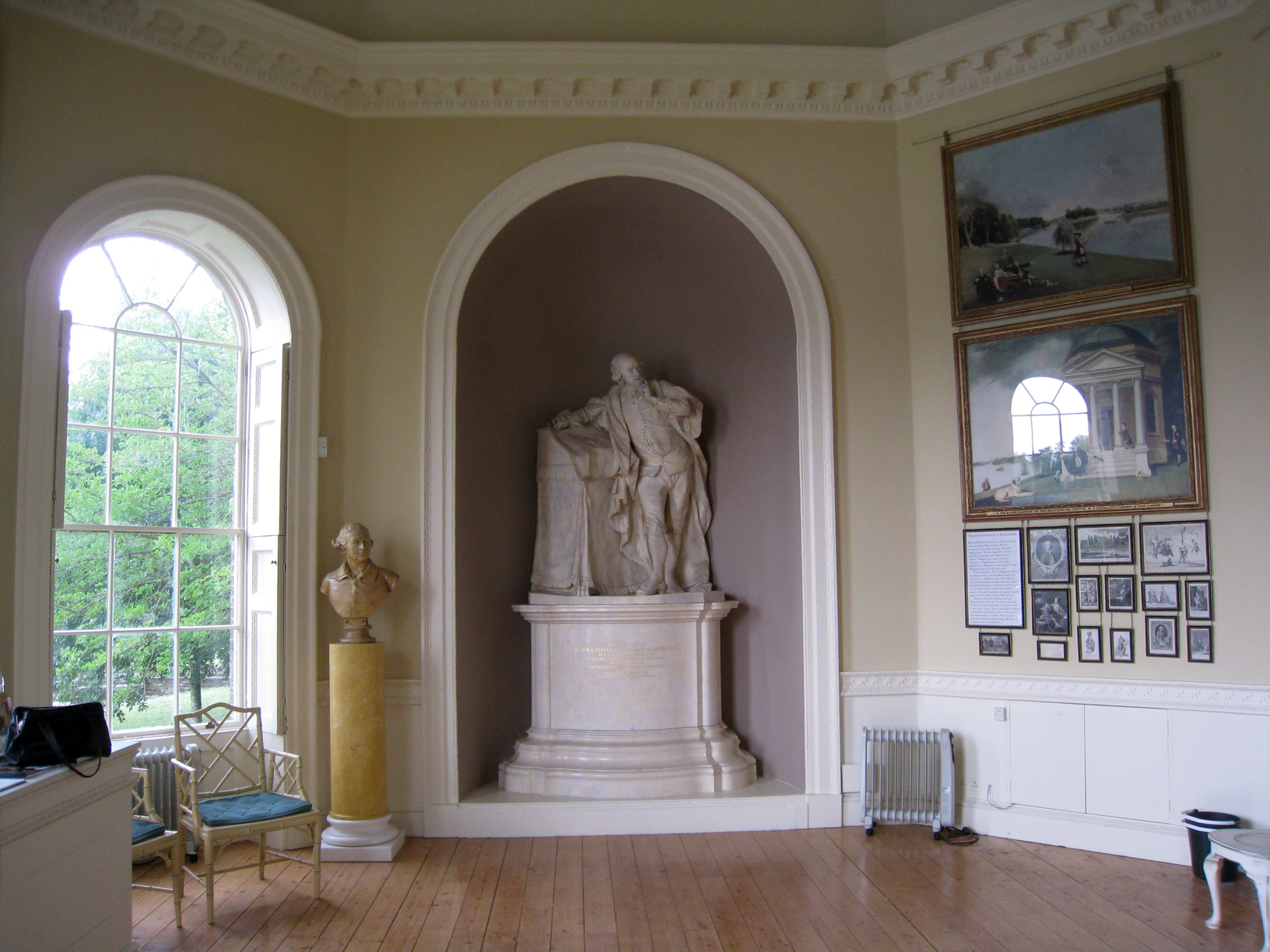
Interior of Garrick's Temple with a replica of Roubiliac's statue of Shakespeare, for which Garrick himself was the model

Garrick employed the temple not just as a museum but as a working building. As well as using it as a quiet place to learn his lines and write letters, the actor used it to entertain his wife and guests for afternoon tea and dinner. The painter Johann Zoffany, a protégé of Garrick, painted a number of scenes of the actor, his wife and their friends on the lawn and in front of the temple. One of his guests, the letter-writer Mrs Delany, described the scene at one such entertainment in a letter of 1770:

We had an excellent dinner nicely served, and then went over directly into the garden – a piece of irregular ground sloping down to the Thames, very well laid out, and planted for shade and shelter; and an opening to the river which appears beautiful from that spot, and from Shakespeare's Temple at the end of the Improvement, where we drank tea, and where there is a very fine statue of Shakespeare in white marble, and a great chair with a large carved frame, that was Shakespeare's own chair, made for him on some particular occasion, with a medallion fixed in the back. Many were the relics we saw of the favourite poet. At six o'clock Lady Weymouth's fine group of children walked into the garden, which added to the agreeableness of the scene.

His visitors were encouraged to pay homage to the Bard by writing verses in Shakespeare's honour and placing them at the foot of the statue. Garrick had the best of them published anonymously in the London journals. Some found this practice cloying; Samuel Foote commented sarcastically that Garrick had "dedicated a temple to a certain divinity... before whose shrine frequent libations are made, and on whose alter the fat of venison, a viand grateful to this deity, is seen often to smoke." Voltaire, too, used the temple as a subject of ridicule in a letter to the Académie française published in 1776. Some of Garrick's contemporaries suspected that, as a rumour had it, the temple was not merely intended for Shakespeare's glorification but for Garrick's own. It was seen as an effort to associate the actor indelibly with the playwright, or even equating the two.

In August 1774, the temple and gardens were the centrepiece of Garrick's elaborate silver jubilee celebrations to celebrate 25 years of marriage. The London Chronicle reported:

Last night Mr Garrick gave a splendid entertainment or Fete Champetre at his gardens at Hampton. Signior Torre conducted a most brilliant fire-work; an elegant concert of music was performed; and the company, which consisted of a great number of Nobility and Gentry, expressed the utmost satisfaction on the occasion. The temple of Shakespeare, and gardens, were illuminated with 6000 lamps, and the forge of Vulcan made a splendid appearance.

Garrick also opened the temple and garden to the public on special occasions. Each May Day, seated on the chair noted by Mrs Delany and accompanied by his wife, he would give the poor children of Hampton money and cakes. A woman who attended one such May Day event later recalled: "When I was called up, I took my six [children] into the Temple, where Mr Garrick was sitting by the fine bust with great cakes before him; he took down all their names, and then gave a shilling and a piece of plum-cake to every individual one; not even leaving out poor babes in their mothers' arms."

=== Preservation and restoration ===
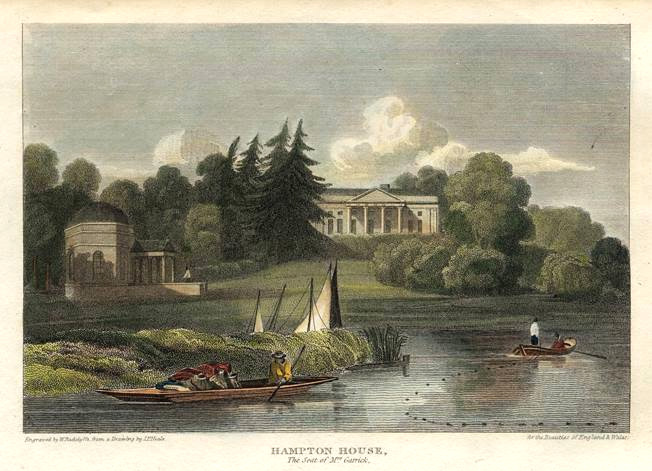
Garrick's Villa and Temple in 1815

The temple and villa remained in the hands of Garrick's wife until her death in 1822 at the age of 98. It was subsequently bought by her solicitor, Thomas Carr, who preserved it as a monument to Garrick and even erected a statue of him in the temple to replace the Roubiliac Shakespeare. It changed hands several more times until, in 1923, the villa was converted into apartments. The riverside lawn was sold separately along with the temple and was bought by a Paul Glaize, who built a three-storey house alongside the temple. This caused such controversy and public outcry that in 1932 the site was bought by Hampton Urban District Council so that Glaize's Temple House could be demolished. The lawn and temple were subsequently opened to the public. They have remained in public ownership ever since.

During the Second World War the temple was used as a post for Air Raid Precautions wardens. It was given Grade I listed status in September 1952 and became part of a conservation area in the 1960s, when it was used for poetry readings. However, it had become neglected and vandalised by the 1970s. It suffered from wet and dry rot, vibrations from traffic on the busy nearby road had damaged the fabric of the building and thieves had stolen the lead off the roof. Donald Insall Associates, a specialist conservation architectural firm, was commissioned by Richmond upon Thames Council to restore the building at a cost of £37,000. The work was carried out by the building firm Gostling and the architect James Lindus Forge. Patrick Baty advised on the paint colours.

By the 1990s the temple's condition had deteriorated again and it had suffered heavy vandalism. The Richmond and Twickenham Times reported in 1994 that it was in a state of "dangerous disrepair" and had suffered from "the theft of lead from the roof and graffiti spray-painted on the walls of the Georgian folly." Vandals had also hacked away one of the wooden columns supporting the portico. In 1995 a campaign was launched to restore the temple and the garden and put them back into use for cultural purposes. The Heritage Lottery Fund provided £70,000 in 1998–99. Other local groups and a campaign led by the actor Clive Francis provided additional funding to carry out restoration work. The restoration fund was also supported by the actors Sir John Gielgud Sir Peter Hall, Sir Donald Sinden, Richard Briers, Peter O'Toole, Dame Judi Dench, Jeremy Irons and others have subsequently made donations.

The restoration work was undertaken by Donald Insall Associates. The temple was reopened to the public in late 1998, and in early 1999 the garden was replanted to replicate its original Georgian appearance. The British Museum provided a copy of Roubiliac's statue of Shakespeare to occupy the vacant niche where the original had once stood. The temple was populated with an exhibition on Garrick's life and career, including copies of portraits by Gainsborough, Reynolds and Zoffany. The project was completed by April 1999.

Today the temple is managed by Garrick's Temple Partnership, which brings together the London Borough of Richmond upon Thames, the Garrick's Temple to Shakespeare Trust, the Temple Trust, the Thames Landscape Strategy and Hampton Riverside Trust. The Garrick's Temple to Shakespeare Trust is chaired by the actor Clive Francis, and Liz Crowther is a member of the Temple Management Committee. The temple is open to the public on Sunday afternoons between April and September. It is used for concerts, annual general meetings and private events, and runs an educational programme for local schoolchildren in conjunction with the nearby Orleans House.

== See also ==
- Astoria (recording studio) (neighbour)
- Shakespeare's signet ring, a seal ring that may have belonged to William Shakespeare. Like the ring in Garrick's Temple, it also has the letters WS
