= Statue of William Shakespeare (Roubiliac) =

Sculpture by Louis-François Roubiliac

Coordinates: 51.5297°N 0.1275°W

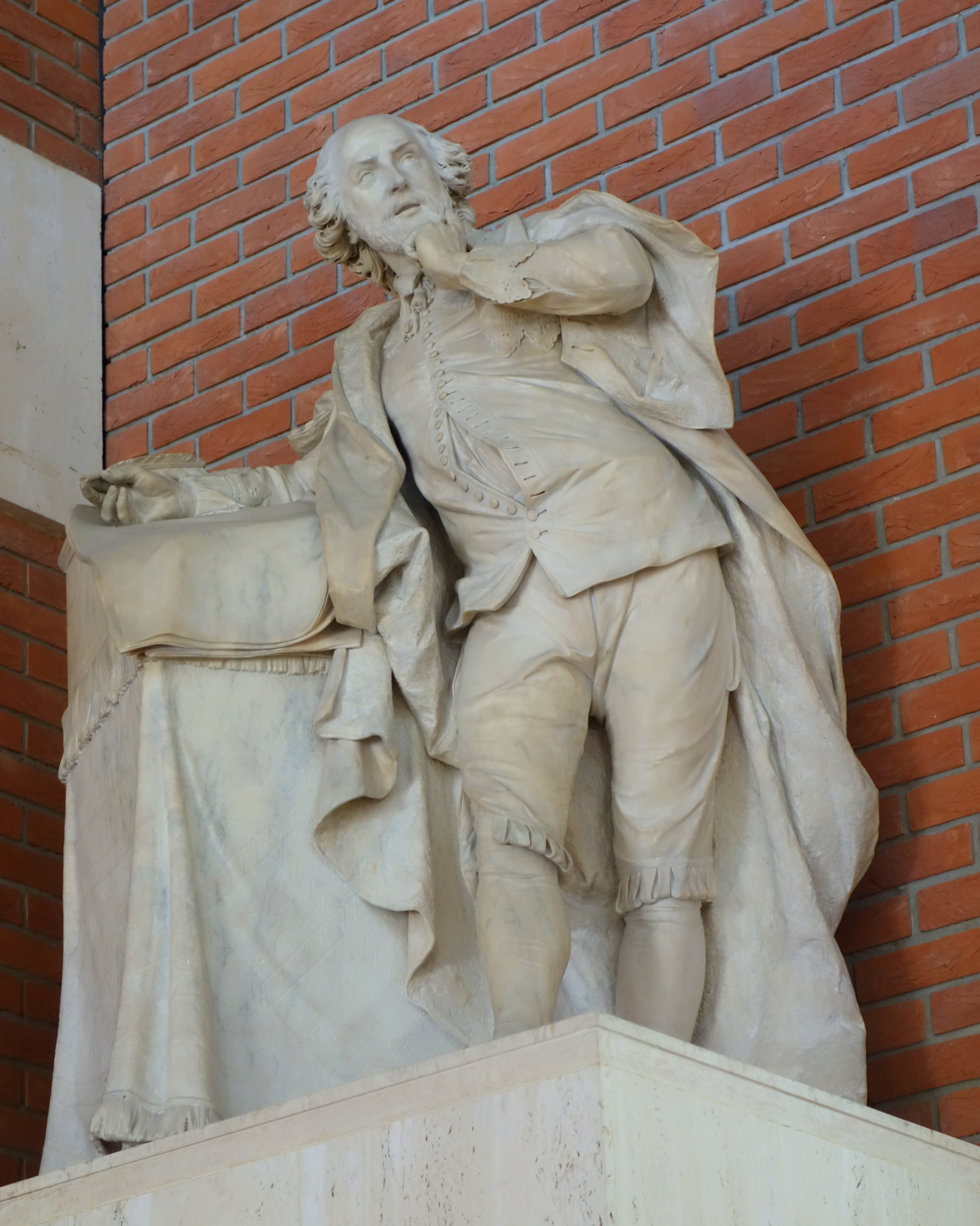
The original statue on display in the reception area of the British Library

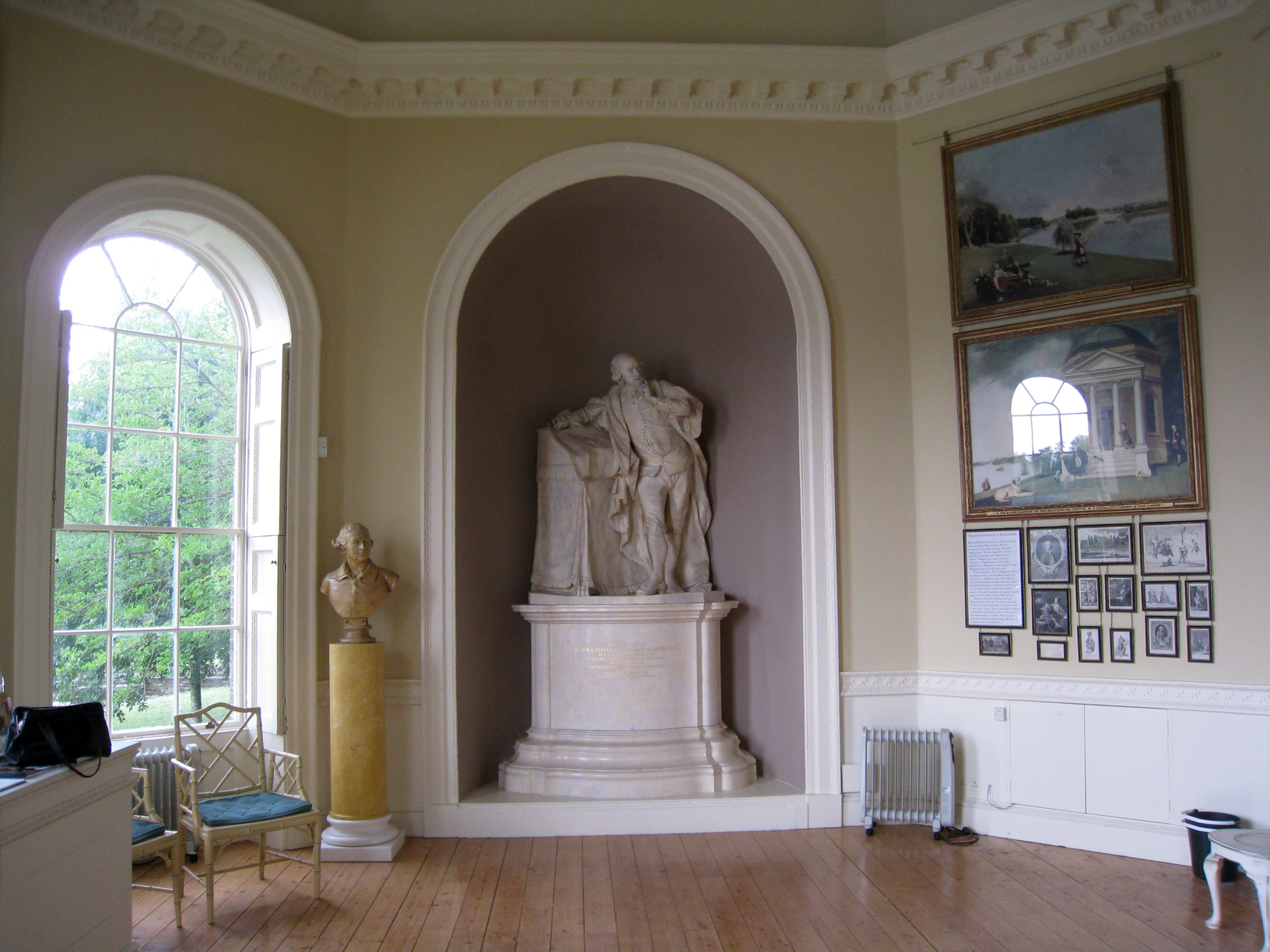
Copy installed inside the restored Temple to Shakespeare

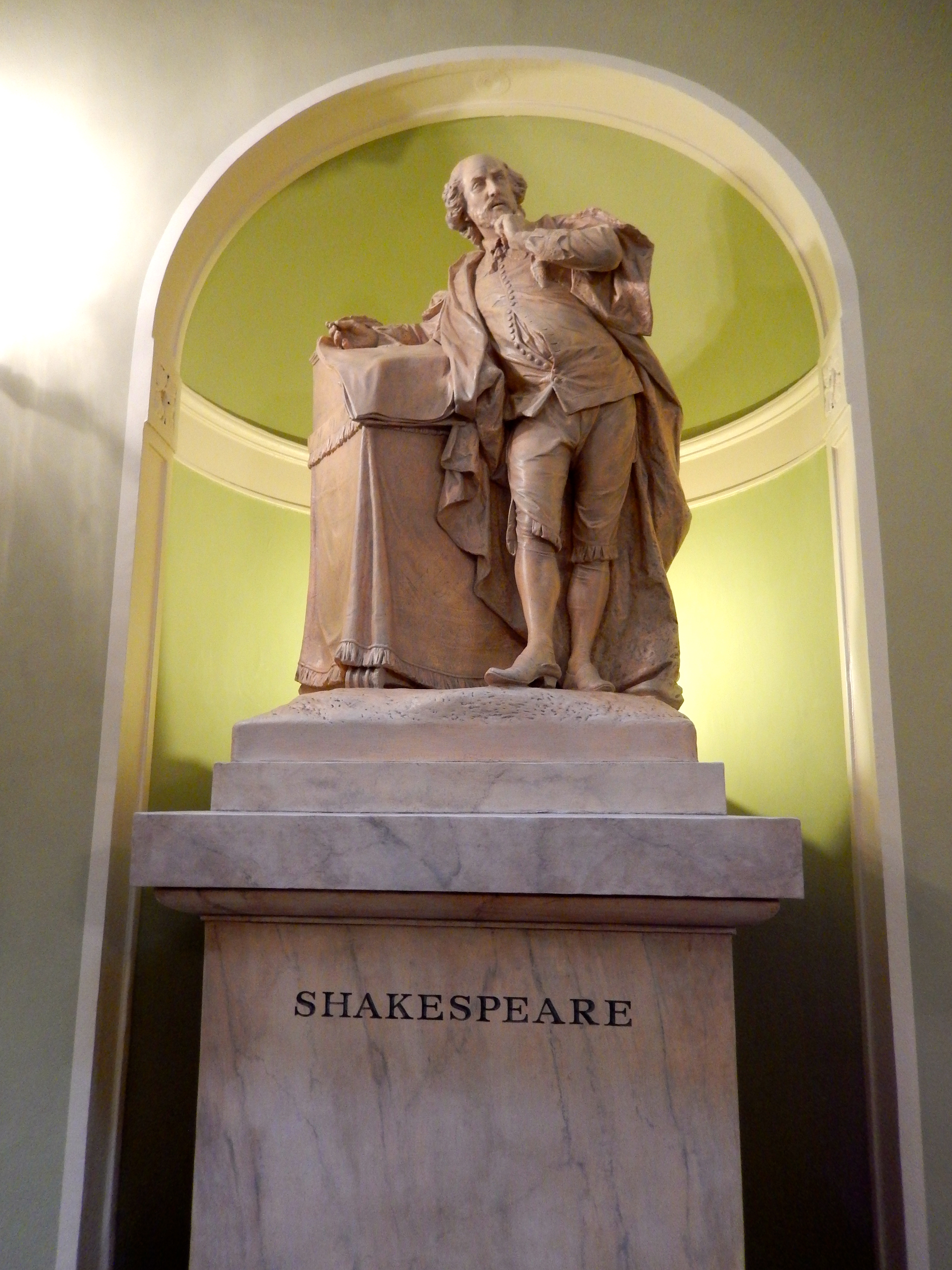
Copy of the sculpture at the Theatre Royal, Drury Lane

In 1757, the actor David Garrick commissioned the sculptor Louis-François Roubiliac to make a full-size marble statue of William Shakespeare for Garrick's octagonal Temple to Shakespeare, erected near his villa beside the River Thames at Hampton, to the west of London. The sculpture cost 300 guineas and was installed at Garrick's temple in 1758; it remained there until it was bequeathed to the British Museum along with Garrick's books in 1779. The sculpture was transferred to the new British Library in 2005, where it is displayed on a new travertine plinth beside the main staircase in the main entrance hall.

The sculpture depicts Shakespeare standing, leaning with his right arm on a lectern covered with a fringed cloth. His right foot is forward and body leaning to the right, with his hips thrust out awkwardly to the left. His right hand is holding a quill pen while the left hand is raised to his chin with the index finger extended along the jawline, as if in thought. The figure is balding but bearded, with ringlets of hair at his temples. Rather than Tudor costume, he is wearing anachronistic 17th-century "Van Dyke" dress, including a shirt with an elaborate lace collar and cuffs; a long jacket with many buttons, but unbuttoned over the lower body; short trousers with fringed legs; stockings and heeled shoes; all draped in a billowing cloak.

The art historian Margaret Whinney describes Roubiliac's bust as having "Van-Dyckian elegance" and notes that "he has greatly ennobled the head".

== Design ==
The body of Shakespeare may be modelled on Garrick himself, and the head was based on the Chandos portrait. Roubiliac worked from a copy of the Chandos portrait that he commissioned from Joshua Reynolds, now lost. The Government Art Collection holds the copy of the portrait that Roubiliac made in c. 1758 from the Reynolds copy; this was given by Roubiliac to Matthew Maty, the first librarian of the British Museum, and transferred to the Office of Works in 1946. The posture is similar to the 1740 statue of Shakespeare made by Peter Scheemakers for William Kent's Monument to William Shakespeare in Poets' Corner at Westminster Abbey

A 1762 portrait of Roubiliac by Adrien Carpentiers, now in the National Portrait Gallery, London, shows the sculptor working on a small terracotta maquette of the Shakespeare statue. A slightly different version of the painting, dated to 1769–1761 with callipers added to the stand for the statue, is held by the Yale Center for British Art.

== Copies ==
Several studies of the sculpture survive, and some moulds and plaster busts were sold in the studio sale after Roubiliac's death in 1762. A 42.2 cm (16.6 in)–high terracotta maquette (a preliminary sketch model) of the whole statue dated to 1757 was bought by the Victoria and Albert Museum in 1867. The Folger Shakespeare Library holds a second 22 in (56 cm) terracotta maquette dated to 1757, and also an 18th-century marble bust of Shakespeare after Roubiliac.

A 57.8 cm (22.8 in) terracotta bust by Roubiliac was acquired by the British Museum at the Roubiliac studio sale in 1762; it was cast in several pieces, with seam marks on the head, and a separate cast body with the join concealed by a high collar, and a plaster support. Another terracotta bust, dated to 1742 and sometimes erroneously known as the "Davenant bust", was presented to the Garrick Club by the Duke of Devonshire in 1855–1856: it is thought to have been installed at the Lincoln's Inn Fields Theatre. There is another bust in the Royal Shakespeare Theatre Memorial Gallery at Stratford-upon-Avon, and a plaster version with bronze patina in the State Library of New South Wales.

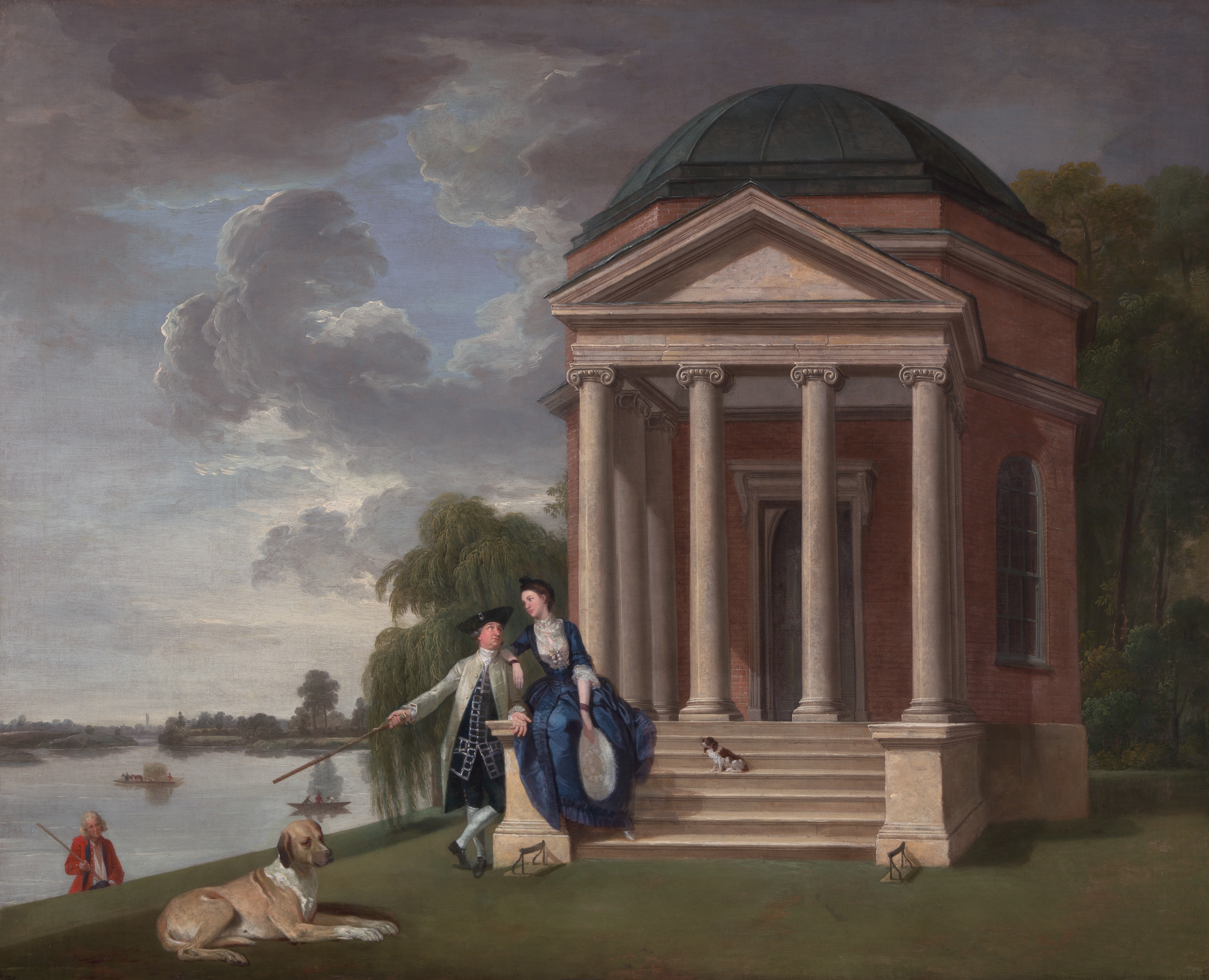
Johan Zoffany, David Garrick and his Wife by his Temple to Shakespeare at Hampton, c. 1762, Yale Center for British Art

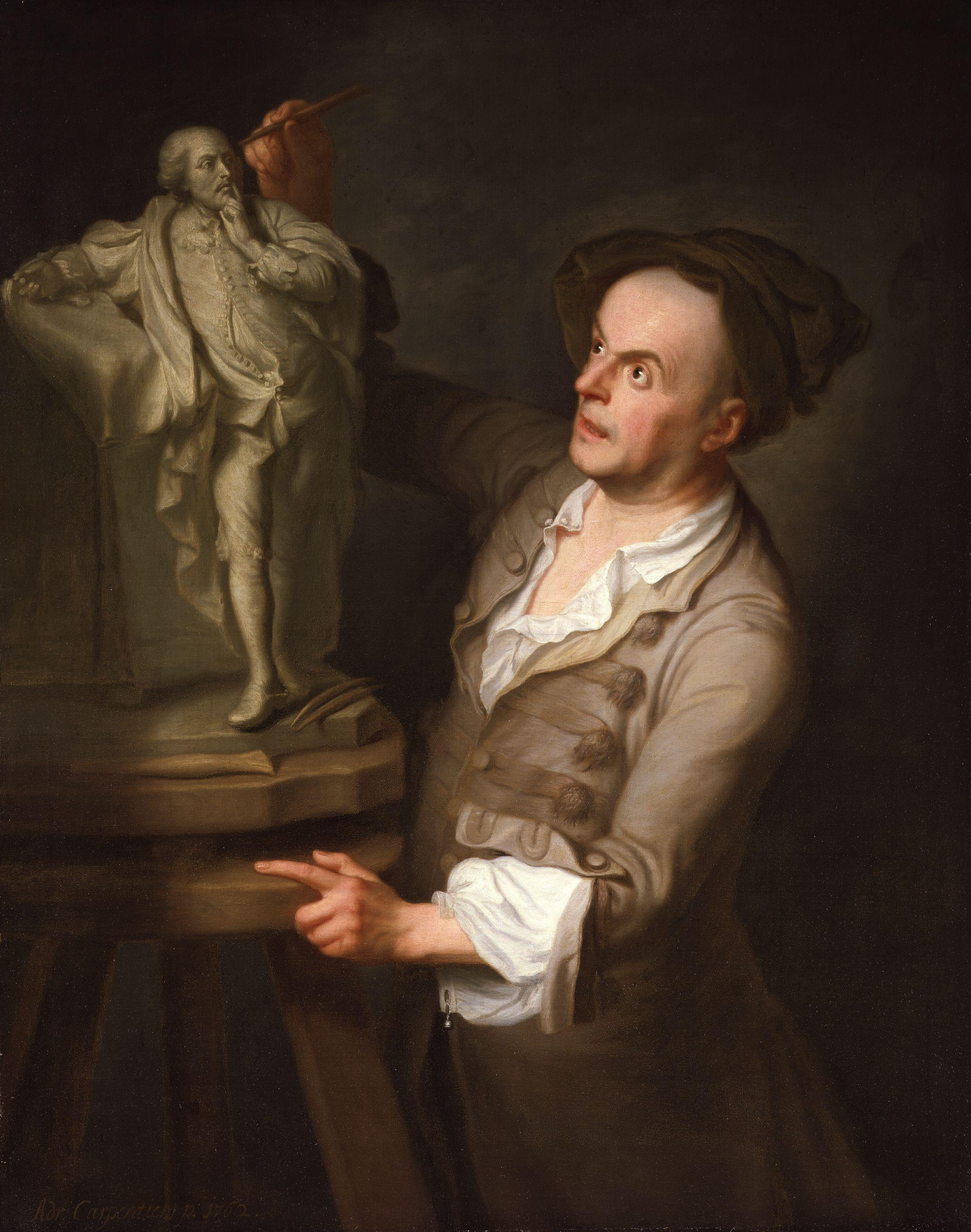
Adrien Carpentiers, Portrait of Louis-Francois Roubiliac, 1762, National Portrait Gallery, London

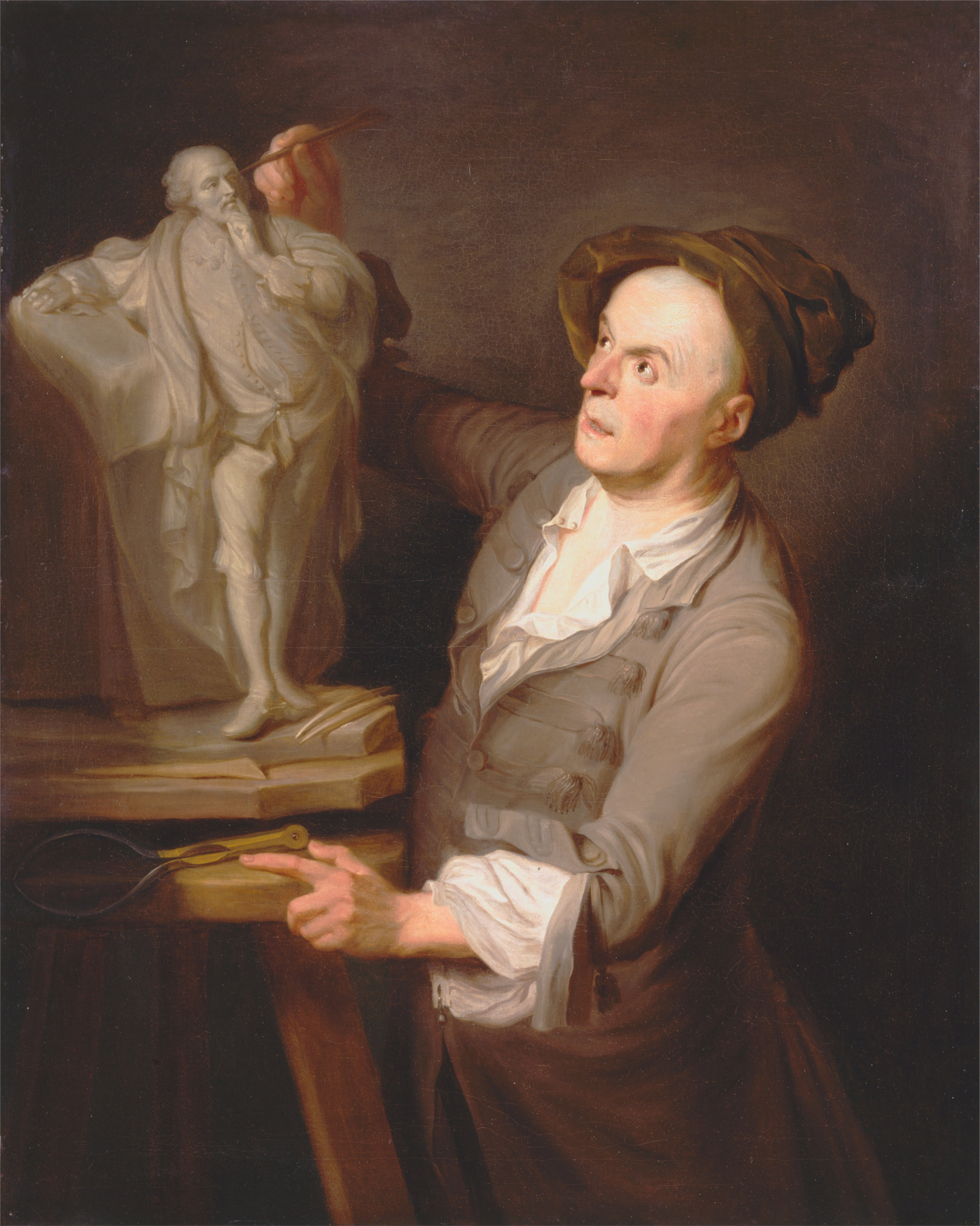
Adrien Carpentiers, Louis-Francois Roubiliac Modelling His Monument to Shakespeare, 1760–1761, Yale Center for British Art

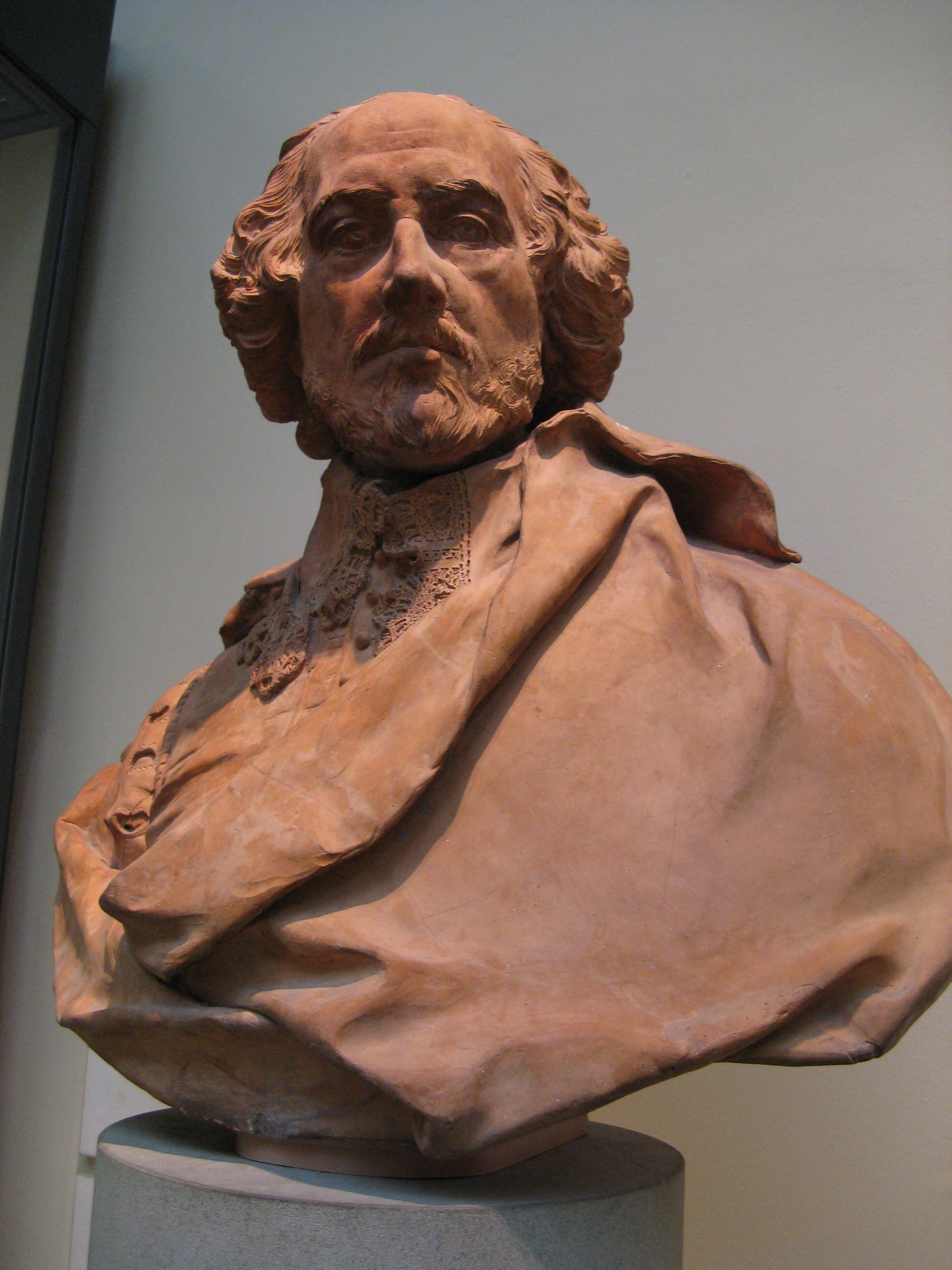
Roubiliac's terracotta bust of Shakespeare, British Museum

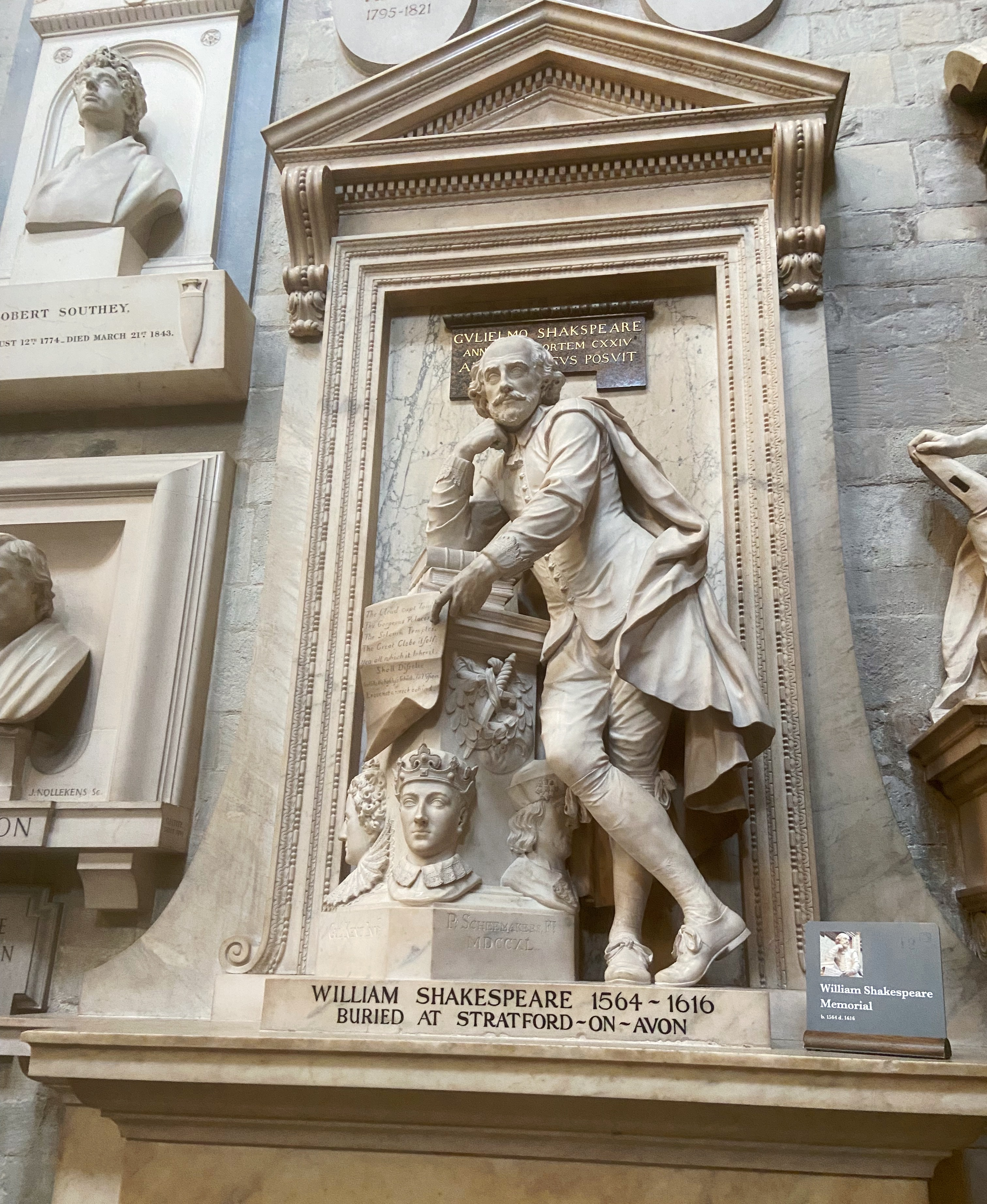
Peter Scheemakers's monument to William Shakespeare in Poets' Corner, Westminster Abbey
