= George Frederick Handel (Roubiliac) =

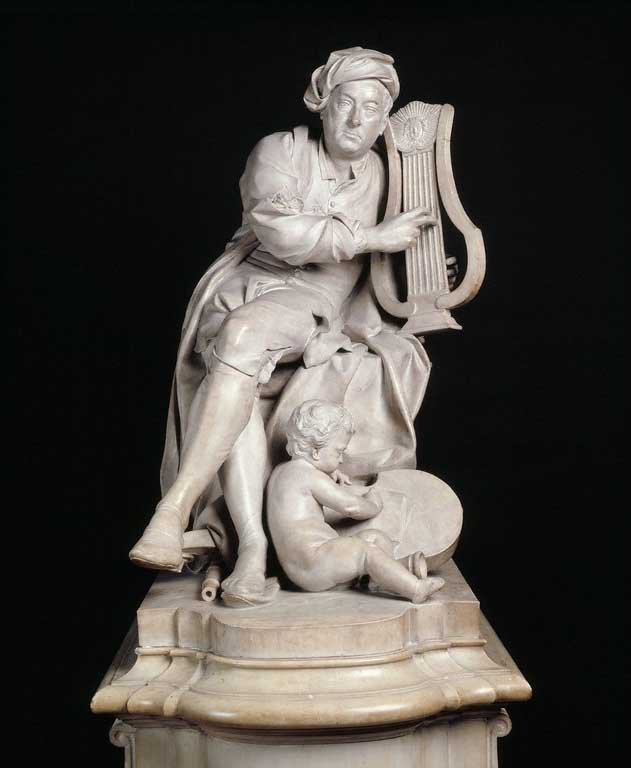
- Artist: Louis-François Roubiliac
- Year: 1738
- Location: Victoria and Albert Museum, London
- Accession: A.3&A-1965

Louis-François Roubiliac's statue of George Frideric Handel is a work of 1738 in the Victoria and Albert Museum, London. It was commissioned by the impresario Jonathan Tyers for his famous pleasure gardens in London, Vauxhall Gardens.

The composer is shown in the guise of Orpheus, holding a lyre. Despite the classical allusion, he wears informal contemporary dress: a soft cap, a long shirt open at the neck, a banyan robe, and breeches undone at the knees. He has thigh high stockings on, and though they are depicted still pulled above his knees, they have begun to slip down as his breeches have been unfastened and he does not appear to wear garters. His slippers, like his hosiery, are also coming off, with one lying on the ground beneath his right foot. His pose is also casual. He is seated cross-legged, leaning on a pile of bound scores of his works, including Alexander's Feast, which was completed the same month the statue was finished. The statue is unprecedented, for not only was the sitter portrayed with startling informality, but it was the first life-size marble depicting a living artist. Until this date such public statues were erected only for monarchs, noblemen or military leaders. Roubiliac was a native of France, although his known surviving work was executed in England. Handel is his earliest known independent sculpture. When it went on display in Vauxhall Gardens in 1738 it proved an immediate success, helping to establish Roubiliac as one of the leading sculptors in England.

Roubiliac was trained in Lyon, later working in Dresden under a leading Baroque sculptor, Balthasar Permoser (1651–1732), and then studying in Paris before moving to London in about 1730. All his known surviving works were executed in Britain. He specialised in portrait busts and funerary monuments, and was renowned for his handling of marble, particularly his creation of subtle surface textures.

== Bibliography ==
- Jackson, Anna, ed. (2001). V&A: A Hundred Highlights. V&A Publications.
