= Louis-François Roubiliac =

French sculptor (1702–1762)

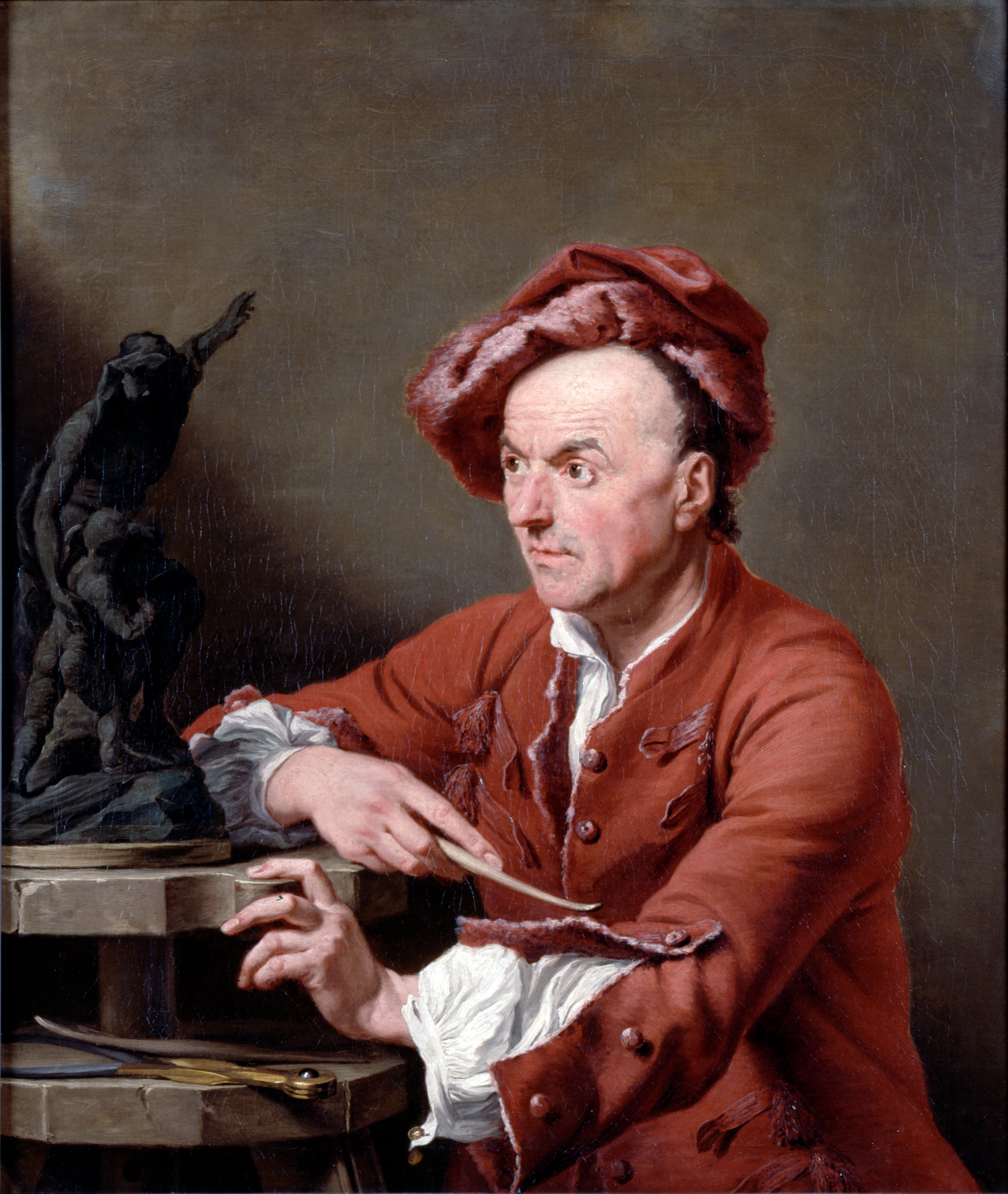
- Portrait by Andrea Soldi, 1751
- Born: 31 August 1702; Lyon, France
- Died: 11 January 1762 (aged 59); London, England
- Education: Studio of Balthasar Permoser
- Known for: Rococo sculpture
- Spouse: Caroline Magdalene Hélot

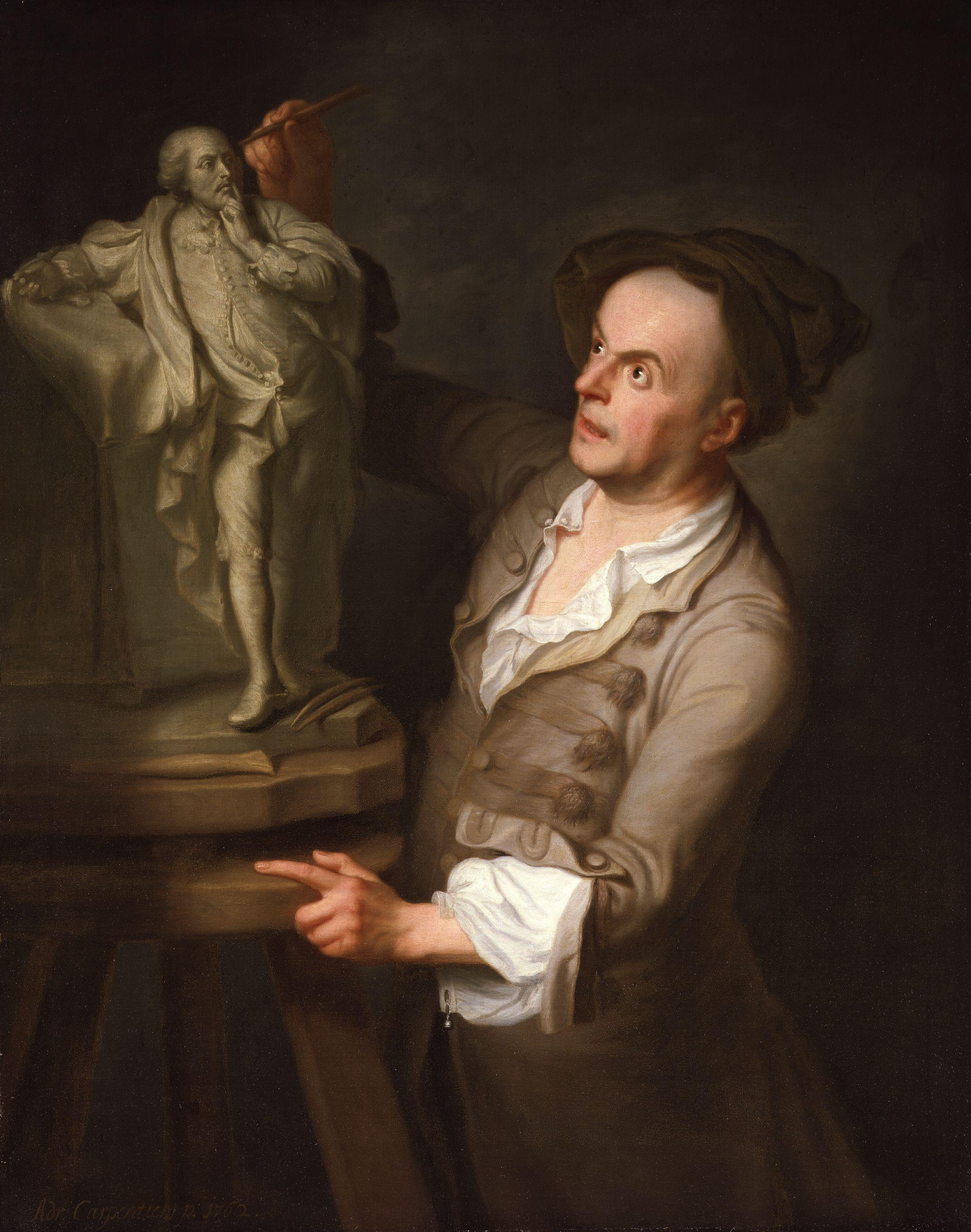
Portrait of Roubiliac making the finishing touches to his statue of Shakespeare, by Adrien Carpentiers, 1762

Louis-François Roubiliac (or Roubilliac or Roubillac; 31 August 1702 – 11 January 1762) was a French sculptor who worked in England. One of the four most prominent sculptors in London working in the rococo style, he was described by Margaret Whinney as "probably the most accomplished sculptor ever to work in England".

== Life ==
Roubiliac is said to have been born in Lyon on 31 August 1702. Katharine Esdaile, a biographer, has suggested Roubiliac may have been born in 1705 as a marriage document in 1735 mentions he was age 30, and the Louis François that was born and baptised in 1702 may have been an older brother who died as an infant. Roubiliac's father, a silk merchant, had moved the family to Frankfurt by 1710. According to J. T. Smith, Roubiliac was trained in the studio of Balthasar Permoser in Dresden, where Permoser was working for the Protestant Elector of Saxony, and later in Paris, in the studio of his fellow-townsman Nicolas Coustou. Disappointed in receiving second place in the competition for the Prix de Rome, 1730, he received his medal but not the chance to study in Rome; he moved to London instead. In 1735 he married Caroline Magdalene Hélot, a member of the French Huguenot community in London, at St Martin-in-the-Fields.

In London, he was employed by "Carter, the statuary" but was introduced by Edward Walpole, son of the Prime Minister, to Henry Cheere, who took him on as an assistant. Sir Edward's intervention resulted in the commission for half the busts in the series for Trinity College, Dublin, and for the Duke of Argyll monument commission, if Horace Walpole is correct in his Anecdotes of Painting in England.

In 1738 he had a great success with a seated figure of Handel, commissioned by Jonathan Tyers, owner of the Vauxhall Gardens. The statue blends realism and allegory: Handel is shown in modern dress, but plays an Ancient Greek lyre, and has a putto sitting at his feet. It is now in the collection of the Victoria and Albert Museum. Roubiliac was recommended for this commission by Cheere. Its prominent placement in the fashionable pleasure grounds "fixed Roubiliac's fame" as Walpole put it, and he was able to open the studio in St Martin's Lane that he maintained until his death. Roubiliac was a founding member of the St Martin's Lane Academy, a professional association and fraternity of rococo artists that was a forerunner to the Royal Academy. His studio in St Martin's Lane became its meeting room; its members came together again for his funeral.

He earned his living from commissions for portrait busts and monuments for country churches until 1745, when he received the first of his commissions for a funeral monument in Westminster Abbey, for one commemorating the Duke of Argyll (installed 1749). George Vertue was one of the work's many admirers; it showed, he thought, "the greatness of his genius in his invention, design and execution, in every part equal, if not superior, to any others" outshining "for nobleness and skill all those before done by the best sculptors this fifty years past" The mourning figure of Eloquence, the notably unkind John Thomas Smith found to be "such a memorial of his powers, that even his friend Pope could not have equalled it by an epitaph".

Even when the patrons were prominent, the churches in which the monuments were installed often lay deep in the English countryside: the monuments to the Duke of Montagu (1752), and of his wife Mary (1753), are in the church at Warkton, Northamptonshire; Horace Walpole, an inveterate country house visitor, noted them: his verdict was "well-performed and magnificent, but wanting in simplicity".

Neoclassical taste, trained to appreciate svelte line and idealised refinements of nature, did not favour Roubiliac's vigour and immediacy: to J.T. Smith the legs of the figure of Hercules, supporting the bust of Sir Peter Warren in Roubiliac's monument in Westminster Abbey (1753), seemed "copied from a chairman's, and the arms from those of a waterman".

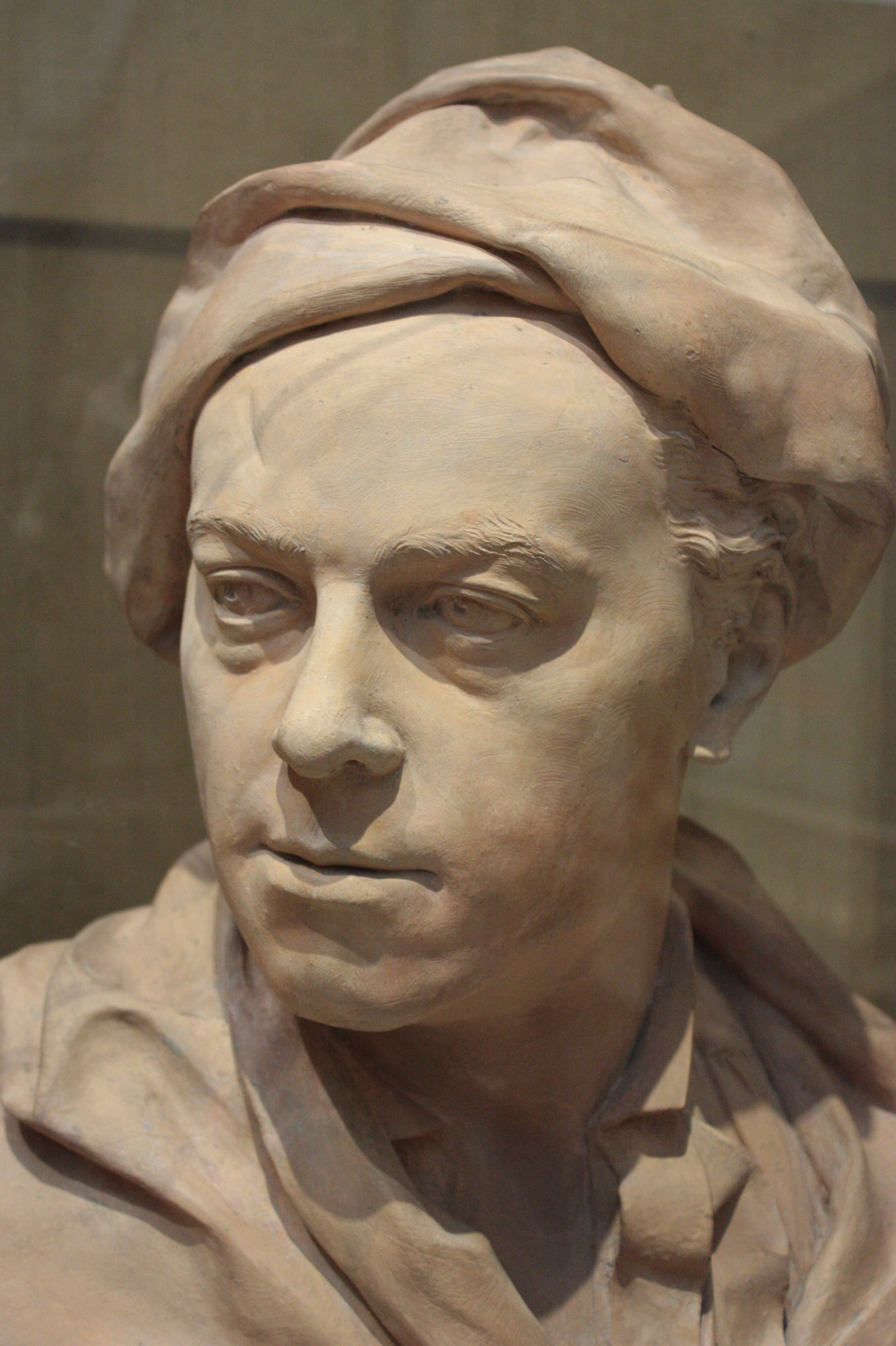
Bust of William Hogarth by Roubiliac

About the mid-century Roubiliac was employed for a time as a modeller at the Chelsea porcelain factory, a new outlet for sculptors' talent in Britain; its entrepreneur Nicholas Sprimont stood godfather to the sculptor's daughter Sophie, in 1744. For a friend like Thomas Hudson he was willing to sculpt figures of Painting and Sculpture to ornament a marble chimneypiece in Hudson's house in Great Queen Street, Lincoln's Inn Fields. For his friend William Hogarth he even carved a portrait of Hogarth's dog "Trump"; it was later repeated in Chelsea porcelain and Wedgwood. His second wife (a considerable heiress) having recently died, he took a brief tour to Italy towards the end of 1752 in the company of several artists.

Soon after his death an auction sale of the contents of his studio was held, on 12–15 May 1762, from which Dr Matthew Maty purchased a number of his plaster and terracotta models, which he presented to the newly-founded British Museum. Prices were derisory, and when his effects were totalled up, Roubiliac's creditors, J.T. Smith said, had to be satisfied with one shilling sixpence in the pound.

Roubiliac died penniless on 11 January 1762 in London and was buried in the church of St Martin-in-the-Fields, where he had been married.

== Works ==
Roubiliac was mainly employed for portrait busts, and from the 1740s especially for sepulchral monuments; these were, in essence, the two outlets for free-standing sculpture in Britain at the time. He also made several full-length portrait sculptures. His most important works in Westminster Abbey are the monuments to the Duke of Argyll (1748) – the work which first established his fame as a sculptor – Handel (1761), Sir Peter Warren, Field Marshal Wade, General Fleming, General William Hargrave and Lady Elizabeth Nightingale (1761).

At Cambridge he made the statues of George I in the Senate House, Cambridge, the Duke of Somerset and Sir Isaac Newton. Trinity College, Cambridge, has a series of busts by him of distinguished members of the college. The statue of George II erected in Golden Square, London, was also his work.

The celebrated bust of William Shakespeare, known as the Davenant bust, in the possession of the Garrick Club, London, must be attributed to Roubiliac. His friend Sir Joshua Reynolds painted a copy of the Chandos Portrait for him. The statue of Shakespeare (1758), a commission from David Garrick to be set up in his garden shrine to Shakespeare at Hampton House, Twickenham, and bequeathed by the actor to the English nation, is in the British Museum; a terracotta model dated 1757 is in collection of the Victoria and Albert Museum.

Works
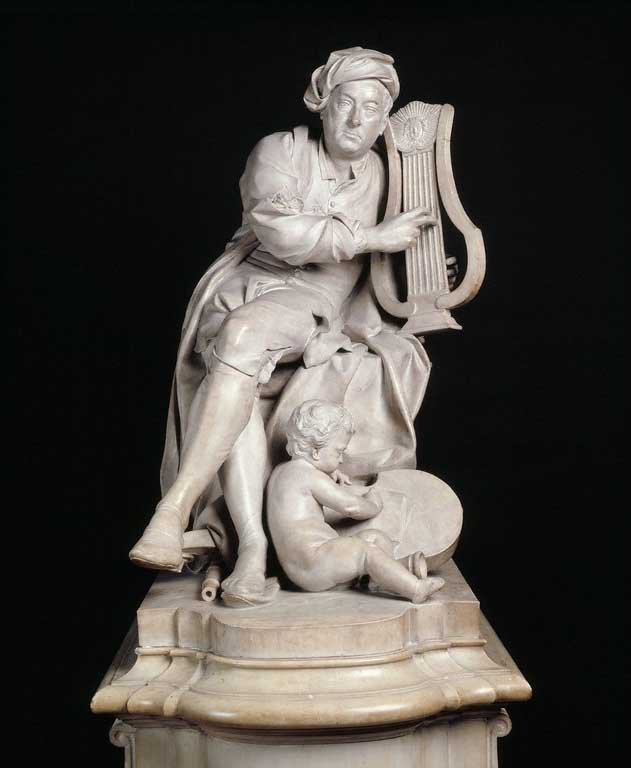
Handel (Victoria and Albert Museum)

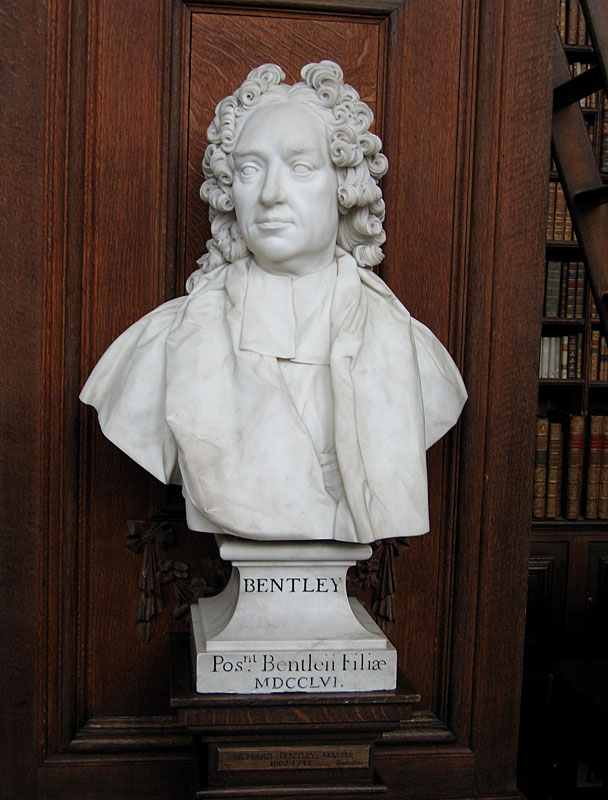
Dr Richard Bentley (1756), one of Roubiliac's marble busts for Trinity College, Cambridge

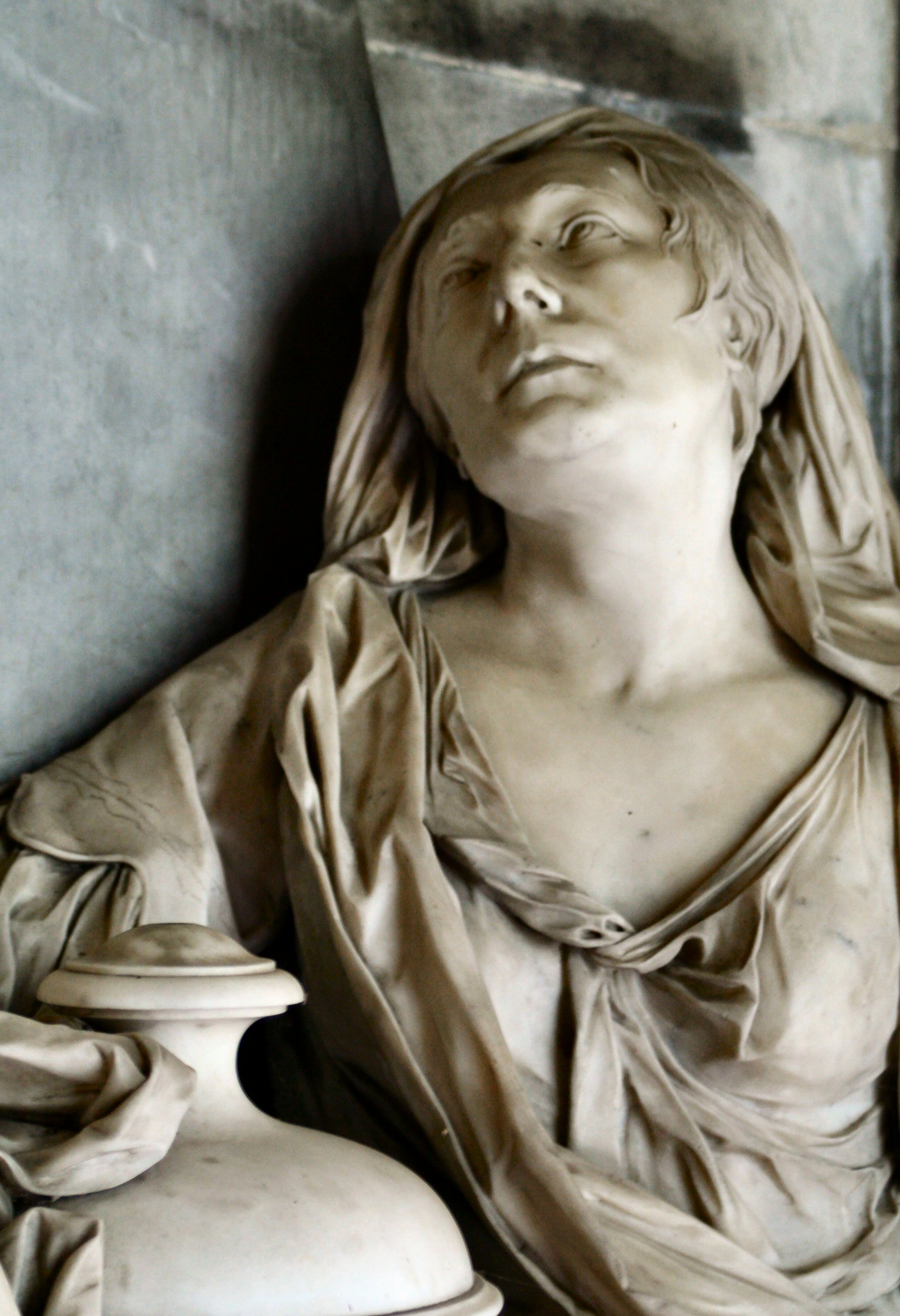
Part of the memorial (1760) placed by Ann Bellamy Lynn to her husband George at St Mary's church Southwick, Northamptonshire

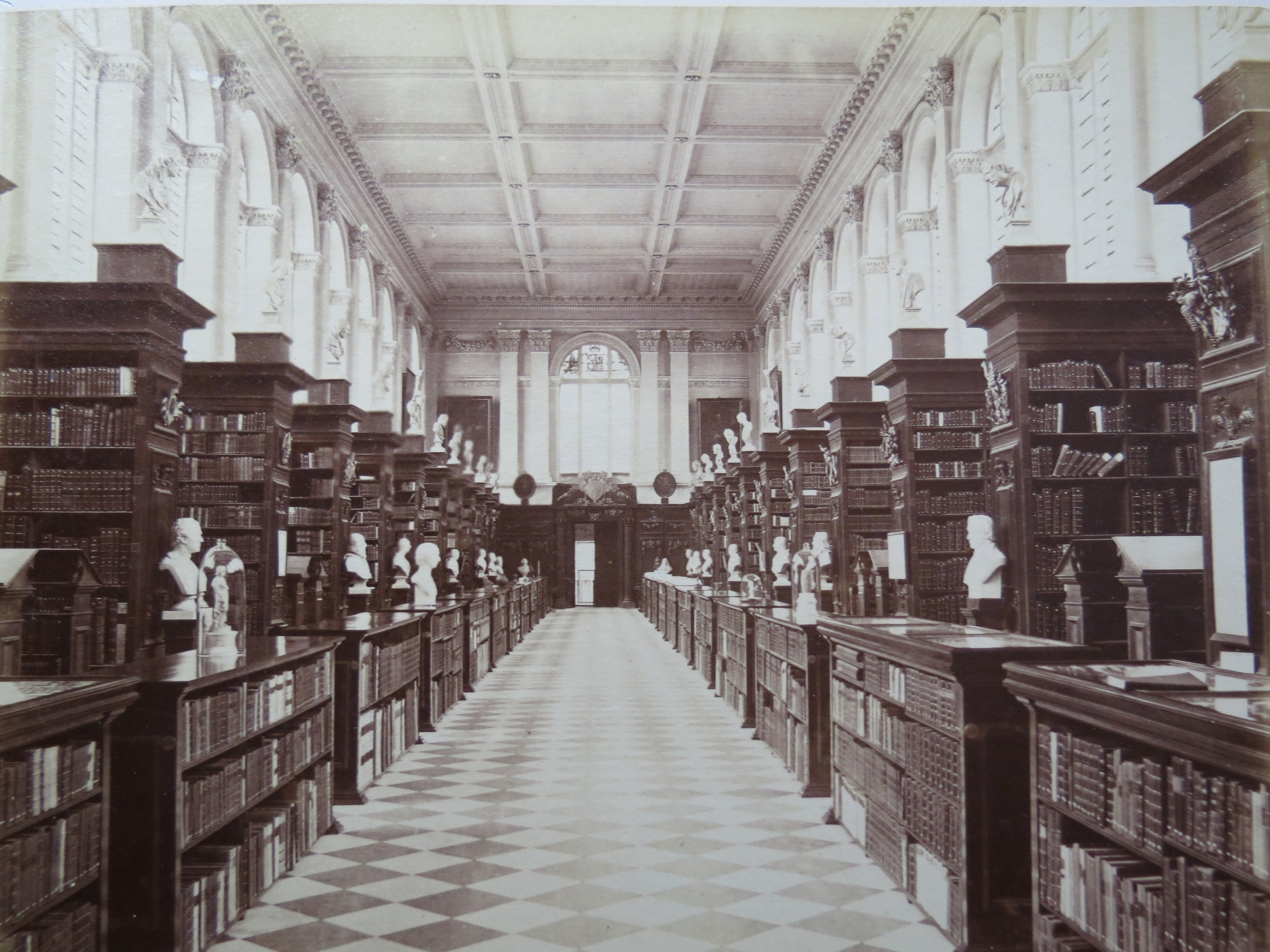
Busts by Louis-Francois Roubiliac, Wren Library, Trinity College, Cambridge University

== Bibliography ==
- Malcolm Baker, "The Marble Index - Roubiliac and Sculptural Portraiture in Eighteenth-century England" (Library of Congress 2014)
- Malcolm Baker "Fame & Friendship - Pope, Roubiliac and the Portrait Bust" (British Library 2014)
- Allan Cunningham, The Lives of the Most Eminent British Painters, Sculptors, and Architects, vol. 3, pp. 31–67 (London, 1830) the fount of information of later biographies.
- Dutton Cook, Art in England ("A Sculptor's Life in the Past Century") (London, 1869)
- Austin Dobson, "Little Roubiliac", The Magazine of Art 17 (1894:202, 231)
- Melanie Doderer-Winkler, "Magnificent Entertainments: Temporary Architecture for Georgian Festivals" (London and New Haven, Yale University Press for The Paul Mellon Centre for Studies in British Art, 2013). ISBN 0300186428 and ISBN 978-0300186420.
- Katharine Esdaile, Roubiliac's Work at Trinity College Cambridge. Cambridge University Press (1924. reissued by Cambridge University Press, 2009) ISBN 978-1-108-00231-8)
- Rupert Gunnis, Dictionary of British Sculptors 1660–1851 (rev. ed., 1968).
- J. T. Smith, Nollekens and his Times (London, 1829 passim); Smith's father was an assistant in Roubiliac's studio.
- Margaret Whinney, English Sculpture 1720–1830. Victoria and Albert Museum Monograph, HMSO, (London 1971).
- Margaret Whinney, Sculpture in Britain, 1530 to 1830. Pelican History of Art (London,1981)
- William T. Whitley, Artists and Their Friends in England, 1700–1799, 1928.
