= Adrien Carpentiers =

English painter (1739–1778)

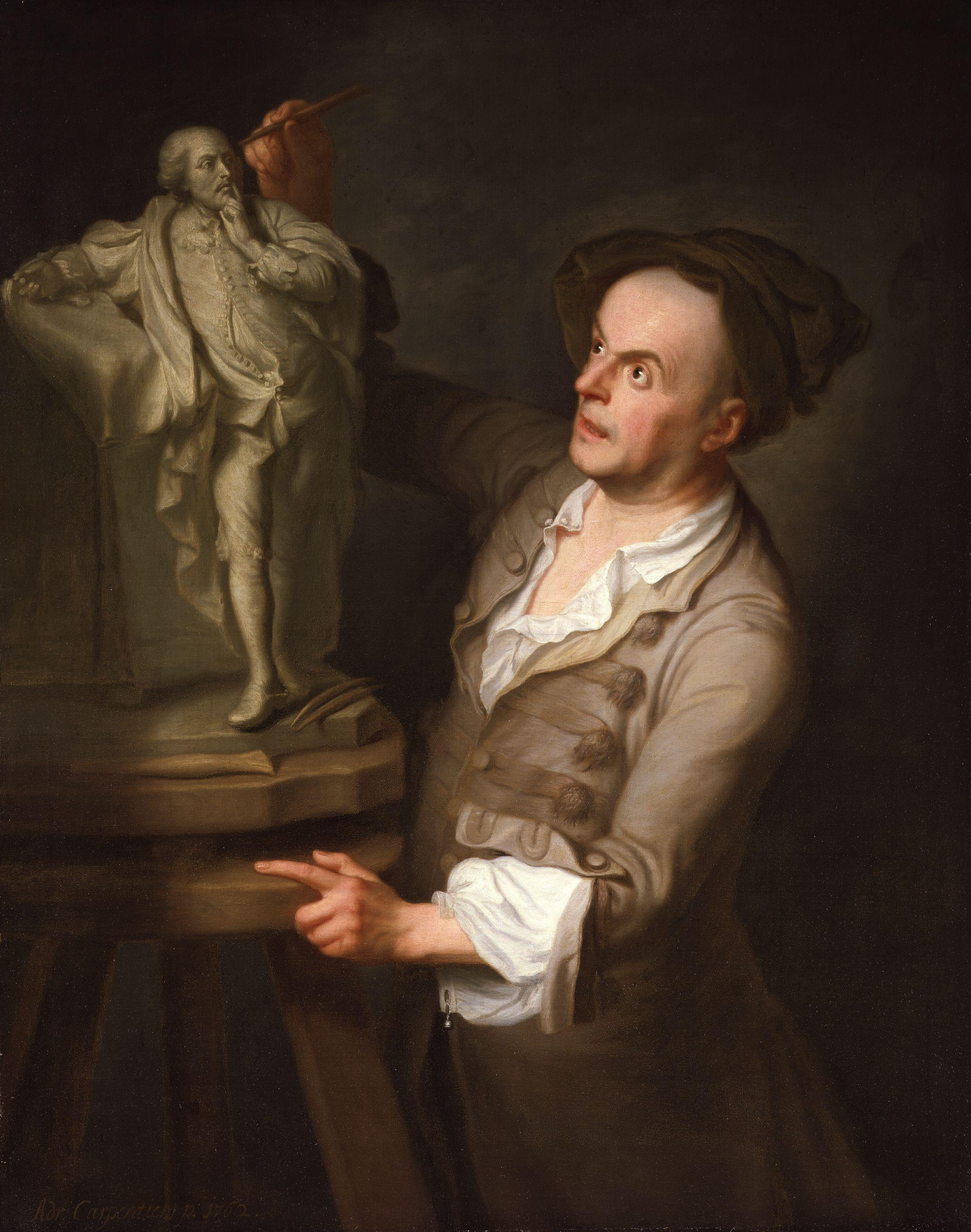
Portrait of Louis-François Roubiliac, by Adrien Carpentiers, 1762.

Adrien Carpentiers, also known as Carpentière or Charpentière (fl. 1739, d.1778) was a portrait painter, possibly from the Low Countries, active in England from about 1739.

== Life ==
Carpentiers, who was possibly of Flemish origin, was active in England from 1739. He worked in several parts of the country, and is recorded as having been in Kent 1739, in Bath in 1743, in Oxford in 1745, in East Anglia from 1751 and in Norwich in 1757, before settling in London in around 1760. He exhibited at the Society of Artists in 1760–7, the Free Society of Artists in 1762–6, and at the Royal Academy in 1770–4. His address is given in the Academy catalogues as "Corner of Charlotte Street, Pimlico" in 1770–2, and later as "At Mr. Liddell's, grocer, Pimlico".

His surviving works include several portraits of members of the Dashwood family at West Wycombe House.

He was acquainted with other foreign artists working in London, including Zuccarelli and Roubilliac. His portrait of the latter, dating from 1762 and now in the collection of the National Portrait Gallery in London, shows the sculptor working intently on a terracotta statuette of Shakespeare.

He died in London in 1778.
