= Hampton Methodist Church =

- Hampton Mission Partnership
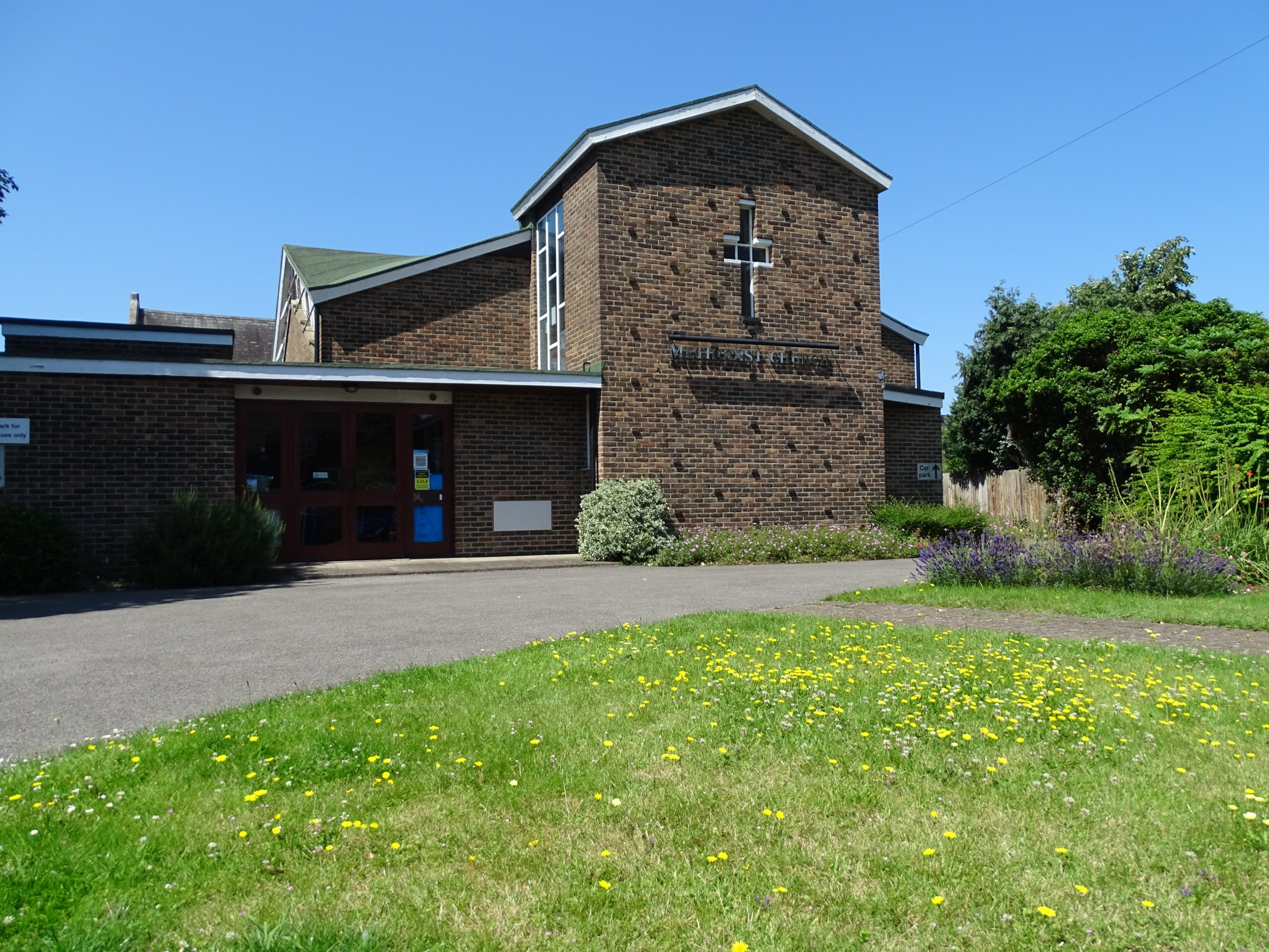
- Hampton Methodist Church
- 51.417301°N 0.373937°W
- Location: Percy Road, Hampton, TW12 2JT
- Country: England
- Denomination: Methodist
- Website: https://hamptonmissionpartnership.org.uk

History
- Founded: 1861

Architecture
- Architect: Martin Lidbetter
- Groundbreaking: 1963
- Completed: 9 November 1963

Clergy
- Pastor: Mr Philip Slater

Hampton Methodist Church is a Methodist church on Percy Road, Hampton in the London Borough of Richmond upon Thames, in England. Since 2019, Hampton Methodist Church has been part of Hampton Mission Partnership. Hampton Mission Partnership was formed in July 2019 by Hampton Methodist Church and Hampton Baptist Church, after Hampton Baptist Church permanently closed.

== History ==
The first chapel, a Wesleyan Methodist chapel on Church Street in Hampton, was built in 1861. It was replaced in 1926 by a new chapel on Percy Road. The current church was opened in 1963. It is located on the west side of Percy Road between Priory Road and Lindon Road (Percy Road, Hampton TW12 2JT).

=== Ministers/pastors since 1888 ===
- ?–1888 Rev William Edward Sellers
- 1888–1890 Rev S Burrow
- 1890–1894 Rev James Walter
- 1894–1897 Rev William Rapson
- 1897–1900 Rev William Henry Groves
- 1900–1904 Rev John Palmer
- 1904–1906 Rev C O Eldridge
- 1909–1910 Rev William T Gill
- 1910–1913 Rev Francis W Moon
- 1913–1914 Rev C R Burroughs
- 1914–1916 Rev Armand J T Le Gros
- 1916–1920 Rev George R Forde
- 1920–1926 Rev W Jackson Bush
- 1926–1928 Rev M Ferdinand Crewdson
- 1928–1931 Rev F E Lines
- 1931–1936 Rev F J Bushby Quine
- 1936–1942 Rev Harry Holroyd
- 1942–1946 Rev Geoffrey W Collinson
- 1946–1950 Rev Francis V Burns
- 1950–1954 Rev Victor Taylor
- 1954–1958 Rev Martin H Yeomans
- 1958–1962 Rev Ronald D Redman
- 1962–1968 Rev Donald S Hailey
- 1968–1973 Rev Peter H Mundy
- 1973–1982 Rev Harry A Dodd
- 1982–1987 Rev J Arnold Clay
- 1987–1996 Rev Ronald F Kemp
- 1996–2002 Mr Jim Stockley
- 2002–2005 Mrs Janet Brown
- 2005–2008 Rev David Woodward
- 2008–2013 Mr Ben Haslam
- 2013–2020 Rev Vicci Davidson
- 2020–2023 Rev Kan Yu
- 2023-Present Mr Philip Slater
