= Jolly Coopers, Hampton =

Pub in Hampton, London

Coordinates: 51.427016°N 0.332772°W

The Jolly Coopers
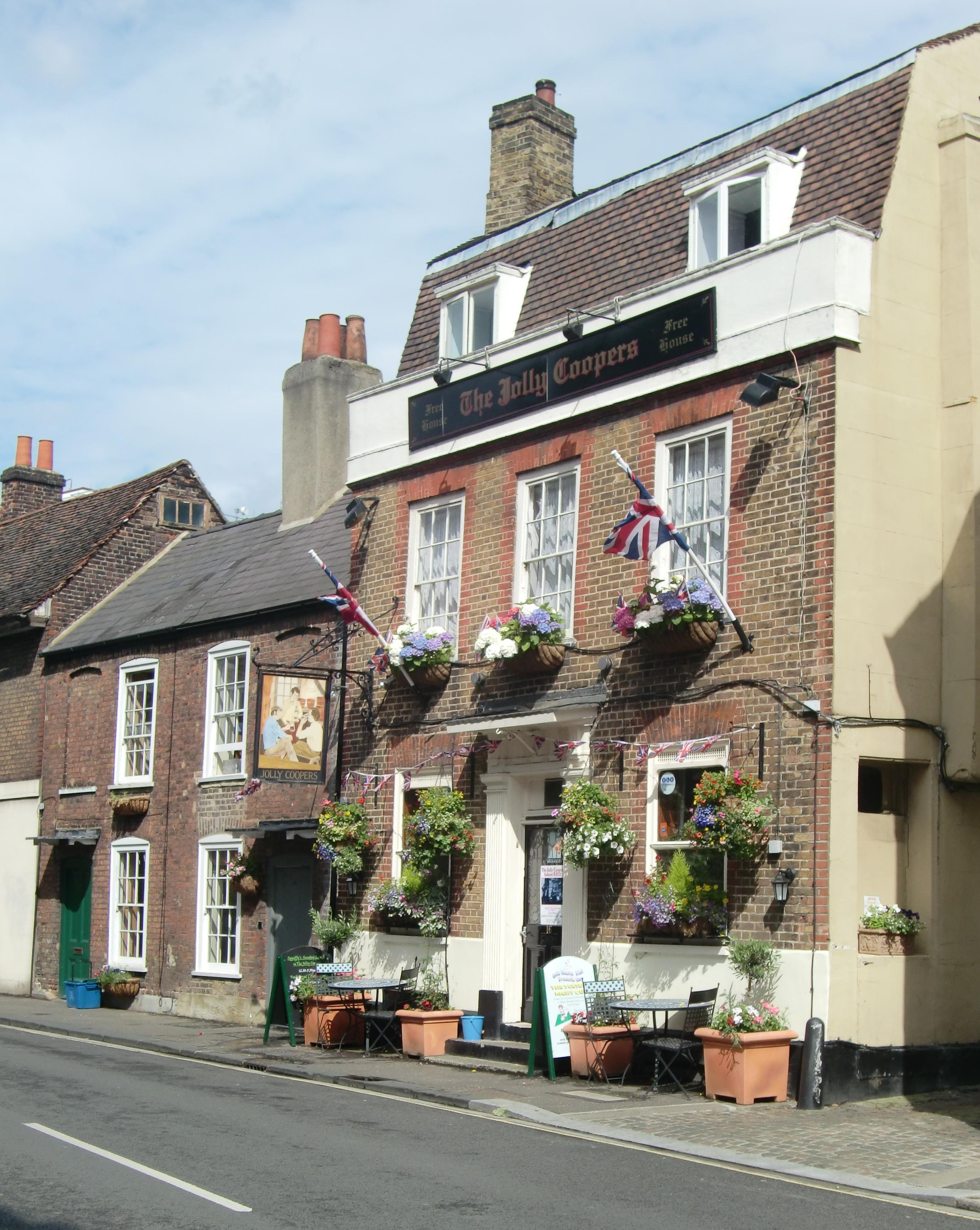

- Location within London Borough of Richmond upon Thames

General information
- Type: Public house
- Location: 16 High Street, Hampton TW12 2SJ (in the London Borough of Richmond upon Thames)

Listed Building – Grade II
- Official name: The Jolly Coopers Public House
- Designated: 2 September 1952
- Reference no.: 1357683

The Jolly Coopers is a pub at 16 High Street, Hampton TW12 2SJ in the London Borough of Richmond upon Thames.

It is a Grade II listed building, dating back to the 18th century.
