= Amateur radio licensing in Australia =

Licensing of amateur radio in Australia

In Australia, amateur radio licensing is governed by the Australian Communications and Media Authority (ACMA) under federal regulations. Licences to operate amateur stations are granted to individuals of any age after they demonstrate a knowledge of the appropriate Amateur Operator's Certificate of Proficiency syllabus for their licence grade. Operator's licences are divided into different classes, and offer different operating privileges in accordance with the increasing knowledge required per licence class. Over time these classes and their knowledge requirements have changed and there now remain three different classes.

== Current licence classes ==
The ACMA currently issues the following grades of licence.

- The entry-level Foundation Class licence. This licence grants the use of portions of the 80-metre, 40-metre and 15-metre using AM and SSB voice as well as hand keyed morse code. Also permitted are portions of the 10-metre, 2-metre and 70-centimetre band using AM, SSB and FM voice as well as hand keyed morse code.
- The intermediate Standard Class licence. This licence class grants access to all the foundation class bands as well as 20 metres, 6 metres, 23 centimetres, 13 centimetres and 6 centimetres. Amateurs with the Standard class licence or higher can use any emission mode provided their transmissions do not exceed a certain bandwidth.
- The highest level Advanced Class licence. This licence class grants access to all the standard class bands as well as 2200 metres, 630 metres, 160 metres, 30 metres, 17 metres, 12 metres, 3 centimetres, 1.25 centimetres, 7.5 millimetres, 3.7 millimetres, 2.5 millimetres, 2 millimetres and 1.25 millimetres. Advanced licence holders may use any bandwidth on the 70 centimetre band and higher.

Also issued to amateurs are Repeater and Beacon licences. These are issued to qualified radio amateurs that wish to operate an Amateur radio repeater or beacon respectively.

== Radio Operator testing and licensing ==
In March 2019, the Australian Maritime College of the University of Tasmania was awarded by the Australian Communications and Media Authority a Deed of Agreement to provide Amateur Radio licence testing for Australia, and administration of licence issue recommendations to ACMA. AMC has established a system of exam invigilators, often associated with Amateur Radio Clubs, who receive licence tests from AMC upon application by candidates, conduct the test session, and return the tests to AMC for marking and further administration. While ACMA formally issues licences, it does so upon advice from ACM that also administers beacon and repeater licences, and changes of licences. This arrangement ceased at the end of 2023.

See the link at acma.gov.au.

== Class Licence Changes 2023 (effective 2024) ==
From February 19 2024 ACMA will no longer issue amateur non-assigned licences to individuals. A class licence has replaced these arrangements.

Under the class licence the bandplan and operating conditions for Australian radio amateurs are largely unchanged; the bands and powers an individual can use, and the operating procedures remain much the same as under the previous individual non-assigned licensing system. The difference is that the qualification itself, plus an allocated callsign will be sufficient to use the amateur frequencies, skipping the additional recurring fees, paperwork and bureaucracy of individual licences. This is an intentional deregulation in order to reduce administrative burden.

Repeaters and beacons will still require allocated licences.

In 2023 the regulator (ACMA) took over responsibility for amateur radio examinations, using a network of accredited volunteer assessors. ACMA issues call signs to successful candidates. The Australian Maritime College (AMC) now has no involvement with amateur radio examination or call sign allocation.
