= OZ7IGY =

Amateur radio beacon

Coordinates: 55°31.0′N 11°52.9′E

Table 1: OZ7IGY transmitting frequencies
Band	Frequency	GPS & PI4
10 m	28.271 MHz	Yes
8 m	40.071 MHz	Yes
6 m	50.471 MHz	Yes
4 m	70.021 MHz	Yes
2 m	144.471 MHz	Yes
70 cm	432.471 MHz	Yes
23 cm	1296.930 MHz	Yes
13 cm	2320.930 MHz	Yes
9 cm	3400.930 MHz	Yes
6 cm	5760.930 MHz	Yes
3 cm	10368.930 MHz	Yes
1.2 cm	24048.930 MHz	Yes

OZ7IGY is a Danish amateur radio beacon, and the world's oldest VHF and UHF amateur radio beacon and active since the International Geophysical Year in 1957. It is located near Jystrup, in Maidenhead locator JO55WM54, and transmits on the frequencies detailed in Table 1.

Since 30 October 2012, when the Next Generation Beacons platform came into use, the 2 m and 6 m beacons have been frequency and time locked to GPS.

Since 30 March 2013 all the beacons using the Next Generation Beacons platform transmit PI4 (a specialized digital modulation system), CW and unmodulated carrier in a one-minute cycle. The frequency precision of the Next Generation Beacons is typically better than 5 mHz. Over time all the OZ7IGY beacons will use the Next Generation Beacons platform.
