= Amateur radio frequency allocations =

Reserved part of radio spectrum

Amateur radio frequency allocation is done by national telecommunication authorities. Globally, the International Telecommunication Union (ITU) oversees how much radio spectrum is set aside for amateur radio transmissions. Individual amateur stations are free to use any frequency within authorized frequency ranges; authorized bands may vary by the class of the station license.

Radio amateurs use a variety of transmission modes, including Morse code, radioteletype, data, and voice. Specific frequency allocations vary from country to country and between ITU regions as specified in the current ITU HF frequency allocations for amateur radio. The list of frequency ranges is called a band allocation, which may be set by international agreements, and national regulations. The modes and types of allocations within each frequency band is called a bandplan; it may be determined by regulation, but most typically is set by agreements between amateur radio operators.

National authorities regulate amateur usage of radio bands. Some bands may not be available or may have restrictions on usage in certain countries or regions. International agreements assign amateur radio bands which differ by region.

== Band characteristics ==
=== Low frequency ===
- 2200 metres – 135.7–137.8 kHz

Just below the Asian and European longwave broadcast band and far below the commercial AM broadcast band.

=== Medium frequency ===
- 630 metres – 472–479 kHz

Just below the commercial AM broadcast band and the maritime radio band.

- 160 metres – 1 800–2 000 kHz (1.800–2.000 MHz)

Just above the commercial AM broadcast band. Allocations in this band vary widely from country to country; it was formerly shared with the largely defunct Loran-A radionavigation system.
This band is often taken up as a technical challenge, since long distance (DX) propagation tends to be more difficult due to higher D layer ionospheric absorption. Long-distance propagation tends to occur only at night, and the band can be notoriously noisy particularly in the summer months.
160 metres is also known as the "top band". For many years it was the longest-wavelength amateur band; although often included among the shortwaves, it is actually located near the top end of the medium frequency band.

=== High frequency ===
Most of the customary band names given below are only nominal wavelengths, not actual wavelengths. For example:
- In the western hemisphere the nominal 80 m band actually ranges between about 85.7–74.9 m, and the international portion from 85.7–83.3 m.
- The nominal "17 m" band actually covers 16.6–16.5 m.
- The nominal "15 m" band actually ranges from 14.28–13.98 m. By common sense, the "15 m" band ought to be called "14 m", but that name has been in longtime use for a shortwave broadcast band.

- 80 metres or 80 / 75 meters – 3 500–4 000 kHz – 85.65–74.95 m actual

Best at night, with significant daytime signal absorption. Works best in winter, due to atmospheric noise from hemispheric thunder storms during summer. Only countries in the Americas and few others have access to all of this band; in other parts of the world amateurs are limited to the bottom 300 kHz (or less) (85.65–83.28 m).

In the US and Canada the portion of the band from 3.600–4.000 MHz, regulation permits use of single-sideband voice as well as AM voice; this sub-band is often referred to as "the 75 metre band", in part to distinguish it from the internationally available frequencies below it.

- 60 metres – 5 MHz region – around 56 m

A relatively new allocation and originally only available in a small number of countries such as the United States, United Kingdom, Ireland, Norway, Denmark, and Iceland, but now continuing to expand. In most (but not all) countries, the allocation is broken into channels and may require a special licensing request.
Five 2.8 kHz-wide channels are available in the U.S., centered on 5.332, 5.348, 5.368, 5.373, and 5.405 MHz. Since most radios in SSB mode display the (suppressed) carrier frequency, in USB mode the dial frequencies would all need to be set 1.5 kHz lower. Voice operation is generally in upper sideband mode, which is mandatory in the U.S. The U.S. and Canada allow 100 Watts in the currently available channels.

The 2015 ITU World Radiocommunication Conference (WRC-15) approved a new worldwide frequency allocation of 5.351.5–5.366.5 MHz to the amateurs on a secondary basis. The allocation limits amateur stations to 15 watts effective isotropic radiated power (EIRP); however some locations will be permit up to 25 W EIRP.

- 40 metres – 7.000–7.300 MHz – 42.83–41.51 m actual

Considered the most reliable all-season long distance (DX) band. Popular for DX at night, 40 metres is also reliable for medium distance (1,500 km / 1,000 miles) contacts during the day. Much of this band was shared with broadcasters, and in most countries the bottom 100 kHz or 200 kHz are available to amateurs. However, due to the high cost of running high-power commercial broadcasting facilities, decreased listenership, and increasing competition from Internet-based international broadcast services, many shortwave broadcasting services are being shut down, leaving the 40 metre band free of other users for amateur radio use.

- 30 metres – 10.100–10.150 MHz – 29.68–29.54 m actual

A very narrow band, which is shared with non-amateur services. It is recommended that only Morse code and data transmissions be used here, and in some countries amateur voice transmission is actually prohibited.

For example, in the US, data, RTTY, and CW are the only modes allowed at a maximum 200 W peak envelope power (PEP) output. Not released for amateur use in a small number of countries.

Due to its location in the centre of the shortwave spectrum, this band provides significant opportunities for long-distance communication at all points of the solar cycle. 30 metres is a WARC band. "WARC" bands are so called due to the 1979 special World Administrative Radio Conference allocation of these newer bands to amateur radio use. Amateur radio contests are not run on the WARC bands.

- 20 metres – 14.000–14.350 MHz – 21.41–20.89 m actual

Considered the most popular DX band; usually most popular during daytime. QRP operators recognize 14.060 MHz as their primary calling frequency within the band. Users of the PSK31 data mode tend to congregate around 14.070 MHz. Analog SSTV activity centers on 14.230 MHz.

- 17 metres – 18.068–18.168 MHz – 16.6–16.5 m actual

Similar to 20 metres, but more sensitive to solar propagation minima and maxima. 17 metres is a WARC band.

- 15 metres – 21.000–21.450 MHz – 14.28–13.98 m actual

Most useful during solar maximum, and generally a daytime band. Daytime sporadic E propagation (1,500 km / 1,000 miles) occasionally occurs on this band.

- 12 metres – 24.890–24.990 MHz – 12.04–12.00 m actual

Mostly useful during daytime, but opens up for DX activity at night, during solar maximum. 12 metres is one of the WARC bands. Propagates via sporadic E and by F2 propagation.

- 10 metres – 28.000–29.700 MHz – 10.71–10.08 m actual

Best long distance (e.g., across oceans) activity is during solar maximum; during periods of moderate solar activity the best activity is found at low latitudes. The band offers useful short to medium range groundwave propagation, day or night.

Due to Sporadic E propagation during the late spring and most of the summer, regardless of sunspot numbers, afternoon short band openings into small geographic areas of up to 1,500 km (1,000 miles) occur. Sporadic E is caused by areas of intense ionization in the E layer of the ionosphere. The causes of sporadic E are not fully understood, but these "clouds" of ionization can provide short-term propagation from 17 metres all the way up to occasional 2 metre openings. FM operations are normally found at the high end of the band (Also repeaters are in the 29.500–29.700 MHz segment in many countries).

=== Very-high frequencies and ultra-high frequencies ===
Frequencies between 30 and 300 MHz are referred to as Very High Frequency (VHF) region and those between 300 MHz and 3 GHz are referred to as Ultra High Frequency (UHF). The allocated bands for amateurs are many megahertz wide, allowing for high-fidelity audio transmission modes (FM) and very fast data transmission modes that are unfeasible for the kilohertz-wide allocations in the HF bands.

VHF
8 metres	40–45 MHz	in parts of ITU Region 1
6 metres	50–54 MHz	
	50–52 MHz	In parts of ITU Region 1
5 metres	58.0–60.1 MHz	in parts of ITU Region 1
4 metres	70–70.5 MHz	in parts of ITU Region 1
2 metres	144–148 MHz	
	144–146 MHz	ITU Region 1
1.25 metres	219–220 MHz	Fixed digital message forwarding systems
	222–225 MHz	US & Canada

UHF
70 centimetres	420–450 MHz	
	430–440 MHz	in ITU Region 1
33 centimetres	902–928 MHz	in ITU Region 2
23 centimetres	1 240–1 300 MHz	
	1 240–1 325 MHz	in UK
13 centimetres	2 300–2 310 MHz	lower segment
	2 390–2 450 MHz	upper segment

While "line of sight" propagation is a primary factor for range calculation, much of the interest in the bands above HF comes from use of other propagation modes. A signal transmitted on VHF from a hand-held portable will typically travel about 5–10 km (3–6 miles) depending on terrain. With a low power home station and a simple antenna, range would be around 50 km (30 miles).

With a large antenna system like a long yagi, and higher power (typically 100 watts or more) contacts of around 1 000 km (600 miles) using the Morse code (CW) and single-sideband (SSB) modes are common. Ham operators seek to exploit the limits of the frequencies usual characteristics looking to learn, understand, and experiment with the possibilities of these enhanced propagation modes.

==== Sporadic band openings ====
Occasionally, several different ionospheric conditions allow signals to travel beyond the ordinary line-of-sight limits. Some amateurs on VHF seek to take advantage of "band openings" where natural occurrences in the atmosphere and ionosphere extend radio transmission distances well over their normal range. Many hams listen for hours hoping to take advantage of these occasional extended propagation "openings".

The ionospheric conditions are called sporadic E and anomalous enhancement. Less frequently used anomalous modes are tropospheric scatter and Aurora Borealis (Northern Lights). Moon bounce and satellite relay are also possible.

===== Sporadic E =====
Some openings are caused by islands of intense ionization of the upper atmosphere, known as the E Layer ionosphere. These islands of intense ionization are called "sporadic E" and result in erratic but often strong propagation characteristics on the "low[er] band" VHF radio frequencies.

The 6 metre amateur band falls into this category, often called "the magic band", will often "open up" from one small area into another small geographic area 1 000–1 700 km (600–1 000 miles) away during the spring and early summer months. This phenomenon occurs during the fall months, although not as often.

===== Tropospheric refraction =====
Band openings are sometimes caused by a weather phenomenon known as a tropospheric "inversion", where a stagnant high pressure area causes alternating stratified layers of warm and cold air generally trapping the colder air beneath. This may make for smoggy or foggy days, but it also causes VHF and UHF radio transmissions to travel or duct along the boundaries of these warm/cold atmospheric layers. Radio signals have been known to travel hundreds, even thousands of kilometres (miles) due to these unique weather conditions.

For example: The longest distance reported contact due to tropospheric refraction on 2 metres is 4 754 km (2 954 miles) between Hawaii and a ship south of Mexico. There were reports of the reception of one way signals from Réunion to Western Australia, a distance of more than 6 000 km (4 000 miles).

Tropo-scatter happens when water droplets and dust particles refract a VHF or UHF signal over the horizon. Using relatively high power and a high gain antenna, this propagation will give marginal enhanced over-the-horizon VHF and UHF communications up to several hundred kilometres (miles). During the 1970s commercial "scatter site" operators using huge parabolic antennas and high power used this mode successfully for telephone communications services into northern remote Alaska and Canadian communities.

Satellite, buried fibre optic, and terrestrial microwave access have relegated commercial use of tropo-scatter to the history books. Because of high cost and complexity this mode is usually out of reach for the average amateur radio operator.

===== Anomalous trans-equatorial enhancement =====
F2 and TE band openings from other ionospheric reflection/refraction modes, or sky-wave propagation as it is known can also occasionally occur on the low band VHF frequencies of 6 or 4 metres, and very rarely on 2 metres (high band VHF) during extreme peaks in the 11 year sunspot cycle.

The longest terrestrial contact ever reported on 2 metres (146 MHz) was between a station in Italy and a station in South Africa, a distance of 7 784 km (4 837 miles), using trans-equatorial anomalous enhancement (TE) of the ionosphere over the geomagnetic equator. This enhancement is known as TE, or trans-equatorial propagation and (usually) occurs at latitudes 2 500–3 000 km (1500–1900 miles) within either side of the equator.

===== Auroral backscatter =====
An intense solar storm causing aurora borealis (northern lights) will also provide occasional propagation enhancement to HF-low (6-metre) band radio waves. Aurorae only occasionally affect signals on the 2 metre band. Signals are often distorted and on the lower frequencies give a curious "watery sound" to normally propagated HF signals. Peak signals usually come from the north, even if the signal originates from a station to the east or west of the receiver. This effect is most significant in the latitudes north of 45 degrees.

===== Moon bounce (Earth-Moon-Earth) =====
Amateurs do successfully communicate by bouncing their signals off the surface of the Moon, called Earth-Moon-Earth (EME) transmission.

The mode requires moderately high power (more than 500 watts) and a fairly large, high-gain antenna because round-trip path loss is on the order of 270 dB for 70 cm signals. Return signals are weak and distorted because of the relative velocities of the transmitting station, Moon and the receiving station. The Moon's surface is also very rocky and irregular.

Because of the weak, distorted return signals, Moon bounce communications use digital modes. For example, old-fashioned Morse code or modern JT65, designed for working with weak signals.

===== Satellite relay =====
Satellite relay is not really a propagation mode, but rather an active repeater system. Satellites have been highly successful in providing VHF/UHF/SHF users "propagation" beyond the horizon.

Amateurs have sponsored the launch of dozens of communications satellites since the 1970s. These satellites are usually known as OSCARs (Orbiting Satellite Carrying Amateur Radio). Also, the ISS has amateur radio repeaters and radio location services on board.

=== Amateur television ===
Amateur television (ATV) is the hobby of transmitting broadcast-compatible video and audio by amateur radio. It also includes the study and building of such transmitters and receivers and the propagation between these two.

In NTSC countries, ATV operation requires the ability to use a 6 MHz wide channel. All bands at VHF or lower are less than 6 MHz wide, so ATV operation is confined to UHF and up. Bandwidth requirements will vary from this for PAL and SECAM transmissions.

ATV operation in the 70 cm band is particularly popular, because the signals can be received on any cable-ready television. Operation in the 33 cm and 23 cm bands is easily augmented by the availability of various varieties of consumer-grade wireless video devices that exist and operate in unlicensed frequencies coincident to these bands.

Repeater ATV operation requires specially-equipped repeaters.

=== Below the MW broadcast band ===
Historically, amateur stations have rarely been allowed to operate on frequencies lower than the medium-wave broadcast band, but in recent times, as the historic users of these low frequencies have been vacating the spectrum, limited space has opened up to allow for new amateur radio allocations and special experimental operations.

Since parts of the 500 kHz band are no longer used for regular maritime communications, some countries permit amateur radio radiotelegraph operations in that band. Many countries, however, continue to restrict these frequencies which were historically reserved for maritime and aviation distress calls.

The 2 200 metre band is available for use in several countries, and the 2007 World Radiocommunication Conference (WRC-07) recommended it as a worldwide amateur allocation. Before the introduction of the 2 200 metre band in the U.K. in 1998, operation on the even lower frequency of 73 kHz, in the LF time signal band, was allowed from 1996–2003.

== ITU Region 1 ==
ITU Region 1 corresponds to Europe, Russia, Africa and the Middle East. For ITU region 1, Radio Society of Great Britain's band plan will be more definitive (click on the buttons at the bottom of the page).

- Low Frequency (LF) (30 to 300 kHz)
  - 2200 metres (135.7 to 137.8 kHz)
- Medium Frequency (MF) (0.3 to 3 MHz)
  - 630 metres (472 to 479 kHz)
- High Frequency (HF) (3 to 30 MHz)
  - see Table of amateur MF and HF bandplans
- Very High Frequency (VHF) (30 to 300 MHz)
  - 8 metres (39.9/40.65 to 40.75 MHz), Some ITU Region 1 countries
  - 6 metres (50 to 52/54 MHz)
  - 5 metres (59.5 to 60.1 MHz), Republic of Ireland. The Beacon in UK
  - 4 metres (69.9 to 70.5 MHz), Some ITU Region 1 countries
  - 2 metres (144 to 146 MHz)
- Ultra High Frequency (UHF) (300 MHz to 3 GHz)
  - 70 cm (430 MHz)
  - 23 cm (1.3 GHz)
  - 13 cm (2.3 GHz)
- Microwave frequencies
  - 9 cm (3.4 GHz)
  - 6 cm (5.7 GHz)
  - 3 cm (10 GHz)
  - 12 mm (24 GHz)
  - 6 mm (47 GHz)
  - 4mm (76 GHz)
  - <2 mm (134 and 247 GHz)

=== Table of amateur MF and HF bandplans ===
The following charts show the voluntary bandplans used by amateurs in ITU Region 1. Unlike the US, slots for the various transmission modes are not set by the amateur's license but most users do follow these guidelines.

==== 160 metres ====
160 metres	1810 – 1838	1838 – 1840	1840 – 1843	1843 – 2000
IARU Region 1				

==== 80 metres ====
80 metres	3500 – 3570	3570 – 3600	3600 – 3620	3620 – 3800
IARU Region 1				

==== 60 metres ====
60 metres	5258.5 – 5264	5276 – 5284	5288 – 5292	5298 – 5307	5313 – 5323	5333 – 5338	5351.5 – 5366.5, UK 5354 – 5358	5362 – 5374.5	5378 – 5382	5395 – 5401.5	5403.5 – 5406.5
IARU R1 (WRC-15) & UK							WRC-15 alloc.				
Also additional channels allocated to WRC-15 Band (or channel) for Bahrain*, North Macedonia, Portugal, Republic of Ireland and Israel.

60 metres	5250 – 5450
Bulgaria, Denmark	
5370 – 5450 Estonia, 5260 – 5410 Norway, 5275 – 5450 Kenya, 5060 – 5450 Somalia.

==== 40 metres ====
40 metres	7000 – 7040	7040 – 7050	7050 – 7060	7060 – 7100	7100 – 7200
IARU Region 1					
Note: 7000 – 7300 Somalia

==== 30 metres ====
30 metres	10100 – 10130	10130 – 10150
IARU Region 1		

==== 20 metres ====
20 metres	14000 – 14070	14070 – 14099	B	14101 – 14350
IARU Region 1				

==== 17 metres ====
17 metres	18068 – 18095	18095 – 18109	B	18111 – 18168
IARU Region 1				

==== 15 metres ====
15 metres	21000 – 21070	21070 – 21110	21110 – 21120	21120 – 21149	B	21151 – 21450
IARU Region 1						

==== 12 metres ====
12 metres	24890 – 24915	24915 – 24929	B	24931 – 24990
IARU Region 1				

==== 10 metres ====
10 metres	28000 – 28070	28070 – 28190	B	28225 – 29200	29200 – 29300	29300 – 29510	29510 – 29700
IARU Region 1							

==== Key ====
CW and data ( ≤ 200 Hz bandwidth).
CW, RTTY and data ( ≤ 500 Hz bandwidth).
CW, RTTY, data, NO SSB ( ≤ 2.7 kHz).
CW, phone and image ( ≤ 3 kHz bandwidth) SECONDARY.
CW, phone and image ( ≤ 3 kHz bandwidth).
CW, data, packet, FM, phone and image ( ≤ 20 kHz bandwidth).
CW, RTTY, data, test, phone and image.
Reserved for satellite links.
Reserved for beacons.

== ITU Region 2 ==
ITU Region 2 consists of the Americas, including Greenland.

The frequency allocations for hams in ITU Region 2 are:

ITU band	Band name	Frequencies (kHz/MHz/GHz)	
ITU band	Band name	Lower end	Upper end
5, LF (kHz)	2200 metres	135.7 kHz	137.8 kHz
5, LF (kHz)	1750 metres	Power restricted, but no license required in unallocated 160–190 kHz broadcast band.	
6, MF (kHz)	630 metres	472 kHz	479 kHz
6, MF (kHz)	160 metres	1800	2000
7, HF (MHz)	80 metres	3.5 MHz	4.0 MHz
7, HF (MHz)	60 metres	Channelized: 5.332, 5.348, 5.358.5, 5.373, 5.405 or 5.351.5–5.366.5 or 5.250–5.450	
7, HF (MHz)	40 metres	7.0	7.3
7, HF (MHz)	30 metres	10.1	10.15
7, HF (MHz)	20 metres	14.00	14.35
7, HF (MHz)	17 metres	18.068	18.168
7, HF (MHz)	15 metres	21	21.45
7, HF (MHz)	12 metres	24.89	24.99
7, HF (MHz)	10 metres	28.0	29.7
8, VHF (MHz)	6 metres	50 MHz	54 MHz
8, VHF (MHz)	2 metres	144	148
8, VHF (MHz)	1.25 metres	219	220
8, VHF (MHz)	1.25 metres	222	225
9, UHF	70 centimetres	420 MHz	450 MHz
9, UHF	33 centimetres	902	928
9, UHF	23 centimetres	1240	1300
9, UHF	13 centimetres	2300	2310
9, UHF	13 centimetres	2390	2450
10, SHF (GHz)	9 centimetres	3.3 GHz	3.5 GHz
10, SHF (GHz)	5 centimetres	5.650	5.925
10, SHF (GHz)	3 centimetres	10.0	10.5
10, SHF (GHz)	1.2 centimetres	24.00	24.25
11, EHF	6 millimetres	47.0	47.2
11, EHF	4 millimetres	75.5	81.0
11, EHF	2.5 millimetres	122.25	123.0
11, EHF	2 millimetres	134	141
11, EHF	1 millimetre	241	250

=== Special note on the channelled 60 metre band ===
(ARRL 60 meter operations )

The primary (first priority) user of the channelled 60 meter band is the U.S. National Telecommunications and Information Administration (NTIA). Effective 5 March 2012 the FCC permits CW, USB, and certain digital modes on these frequencies by amateurs on a secondary basis.

The FCC Report and Order permits the use of digital modes that comply with emission designator “60H0J2B”, which includes PSK31 as well as any RTTY signal with a bandwidth of less than 60 Hz. The Report and Order also allows the use of modes that comply with emission designator “2K80J2D”, which includes any digital mode with a bandwidth of 2.8 kHz or less whose technical characteristics have been documented publicly, per Part 97.309(4) of the FCC Rules. Such modes would include PACTOR I, II, or III, 300 baud packet, MFSK, MT63, Contestia, Olivia, DominoEX, and others.

On 60 meters, hams are restricted to only one signal per channel, and automatic operation is not permitted. In addition, the FCC continues to require that all digital transmissions be centred on the channel-centre frequencies, which the Report and Order defines as being 1.5 kHz above the suppressed carrier frequency of a transceiver operated in the upper side-band (USB) mode. As amateur radio equipment displays the carrier frequency, it is important for operators to understand correct frequency calculations for digital "sound-card" modes to ensure compliance with the channel-center requirement.

The ARRL has a "detailed band plan" for US hams showing allocations within each band.

RAC has a "chart showing the frequencies available to amateurs in Canada". 21 June 2017.

=== Table of amateur MF and HF allocations in the United States and Canada ===
160 m	1800 – 2000
Canada	
United States	1800 – 2000
General, Advanced, Extra	

80 / 75 m	3500 – 4000				
Canada					
United States	3500 – 3525	3525 – 3600	3600 – 3700	3700 – 3800	3800 – 4000
Novice / Technician					
General					
Advanced					
Extra					

60 m	5330 – 5406				
Canada	5332.0	5348.0	5358.5	5373.0	5405.0
United States	5332.0	5348.0	5358.5	5373.0	5405.0
General, Advanced, Extra					
Basic (hon.), Code, Adv.					
Note: US licensees operating 60 m are limited to 100 watts PEP ERP relative to a 1/2 wave dipole. Canadian operators are restricted to 100 watts PEP.

40 m	7000 – 7300			
Canada				
United States	7000 – 7025	7025 – 7125	7125 – 7175	7175 – 7300
Novice / Technician				
General				
Advanced				
Extra				

30 m	10100-10150
Canada	
United States	
Note: US limited to General, Advanced and Extra licensees; 200 watts PEP

20 m	14000 – 14350				
Canada					
United States	14000-14025	14025-14150	14150-14175	14175-14225	14225-14350
General					
Advanced					
Extra					

17 m	18068 – 18168	
Canada		
United States	18068 – 18110	18110 – 18168
General, Advanced, Extra		

15 m	21000 – 21450				
Canada					
United States	21000 – 21025	21025 – 21200	21200 – 21225	21225 – 21275	21275 – 21450
Novice / Technician					
General					
Advanced					
Extra					

12 m	24890 – 24990	
Canada		
United States	24890 – 24930	24930 – 24990
General, Advanced, Extra		

10 m	28000 – 29700		
Canada			
United States	28000 – 28300	28300 – 28500	28500 – 29700
Novice / Technician			
General, Advanced, Extra			
Note: The 10 metre table is one-third scale, relative to the other tables

==== Key ====
CW, RTTY and data (US: ≤ 1 kHz bandwidth).
CW, RTTY, data, MCW, phone (AM and SSB), and image (narrow band SSTV modes only).
CW, phone and image.
CW and SSB phone (US: Novice & Technician 200 watts PEP only).
CW, RTTY, data, phone and image.
CW (US: Novice & Technician 200 watts PEP only).
CW, Upper sideband suppressed carrier phone, 2.8 kHz bandwidth (2K80J3E) data (60H0J2B and 2K80J2D), 100 watts ERP referenced to a 1/2 wave dipole.
CW, RTTY and data (US: ≤ 1 kHz bandwidth; Novice & Technician 200 watts PEP).

== ITU Region 3 ==
ITU region 3 consists of Australia, Indonesia, Japan, New Zealand, the South Pacific, and Asia south of Siberia. The IARU frequency allocations for hams in ITU Region 3 are:

ITU band	Band name	Frequencies (MHz)	
ITU band	Band name	Lower end	Upper end
5, LF	2200 metres	135.7 kHz	137.8 kHz
6, MF	630 metres	472 kHz	479 kHz
6, MF	160 metres	1.8	2.0
7, HF	80 metres	3.5	3.9
7, HF	60 metres	5.351.5	5.366.5
7, HF	40 metres	7.0	7.3
7, HF	30 metres	10.1	10.15
7, HF	20 metres	14	14.35
7, HF	17 metres	18.068	18.168
7, HF	15 metres	21	21.45
7, HF	12 metres	24.89	24.99
7, HF	10 metres	28	29.7
8, VHF	6 metres	50	54
8, VHF	2 metres	144	148
9, UHF	70 centimetres	430	450
9, UHF	23 centimetres	1240	1300

Bands above 1300 MHz: societies should consult with the amateur satellite community for proposed satellite operating frequencies before deciding local bandplans above 1300 MHz.

Not all Member Unions follow this plan. As an example, the ACMA does not allow Australian Amateurs to use 3.700 MHz to 3.768 MHz and 3.800 MHz to 3.900 MHz, allocating this region to Emergency and Ambulatory services (Allocations can be found conducting a search of the ACMA Radcomms register . )

The Wireless Institute of Australia has charts for Amateur frequencies for Australia.

The New Zealand Association of Radio Transmitters (NZART) has charts for Amateur frequencies for New Zealand.

The Japan Amateur Radio League (JARL) have charts for Amateur frequencies in Japan

== Space operations ==
Radio amateurs may engage in satellite and space craft communications; however, the frequencies allowed for such activities are allocated separately from more general use radio amateur bands.

Under the International Telecommunication Union's rules, all amateur radio operations may only occur within 50 kilometres (31 mi) of the Earth's surface. As such, the Amateur Radio Service is not permitted to engage in satellite operations; however, a sister radio service, called the Amateur Satellite Service, exists which allows satellite operations for the same purposes as the Amateur Radio Service.

In most countries, an amateur radio license conveys operating privileges in both services, and in practice, the legal distinction between the two services is transparent to the average licensee. The primary reason the two services are separate is to limit the frequencies available for satellite operations. Due to the shared nature of the amateur radio allocations internationally, and the nature of satellites to roam worldwide, the ITU does not consider all amateur radio bands appropriate for satellite operations. Being separate from the Amateur Radio Service, the Amateur Satellite Service receives its own frequency allocations. All the allocations are within amateur radio bands, and with one exception, the allocations are the same in all three ITU regions.

Some of the allocations are limited by the ITU in what direction transmissions may be sent (EG: "Earth-to-space" or up-links only). All amateur satellite operations occur within the allocations tabled below, except for AO-7, which has an up-link from 432.125 MHz to 432.175 MHz.

International amateur satellite frequency allocations
Range	Band	Letter (Note: AMSAT band letters. Not all bands have been assigned a letter by AMSAT.)	Allocation	Preferred sub-bands (Note: For some allocations, satellite operations are predominantly concentrated in a sub-band of the allocation.)	User status	Notes
HF	40 m		7.000 – 7.100 MHz		Primary	
HF	20 m		14.000 – 14.250 MHz		Primary	
HF	17 m		18.068 – 18.168 MHz		Primary	Entire amateur radio band
HF	15 m	H	21.000 – 21.450 MHz		Primary	Entire amateur radio band
HF	12 m		24.890 – 24.990 MHz		Primary	Entire amateur radio band
HF	10 m	A	28.000 – 29.700 MHz	29.300 – 29.510 MHz	Primary	Entire amateur radio band
VHF	2 m	V	144.000 – 146.000 MHz	145.800 – 146.000 MHz	Primary	
UHF	70 cm	U	435.000 – 438.000 MHz		NIB (Note: Footnote allocation. Use is only allowed on a non-interference basis to other users, as per ITU footnote 5.282.)	
UHF	23 cm	L	1.260 – 1.270 GHz		NIB	Only uplinks allowed
UHF	13 cm	S	2.400 – 2.450 GHz	2.400 – 2.403 GHz	NIB	
SHF	9 cm	S2	3.400 – 3.410 GHz		NIB	Not available in ITU region 1.
SHF	5 cm	C	5.650 – 5.670 GHz		NIB	Only uplinks allowed
SHF	5 cm	C	5.830 – 5.850 GHz		Secondary	Only downlinks allowed
SHF	3 cm	X	10.450 – 10.500 GHz		Secondary	
SHF	1.2 cm	K	24.000 – 24.050 GHz		Primary	
EHF (Note: No amateur satellite operations have yet occurred at EHF; however, AMSAT's P3E is planned to have an R band down-link.)	6 mm	R	47.000 – 47.200 GHz		Primary	Entire amateur radio band
EHF	4 mm		76.000 – 77.500 GHz		Secondary	
EHF	4 mm		77.500 – 78.000 GHz		Primary	
EHF	4 mm		78.000 – 81.000 GHz		Secondary	
EHF	2 mm		134.000 – 136.000 GHz		Primary	Entire amateur radio band
EHF	2 mm		136.000 – 141.000 GHz		Secondary	Entire amateur radio band
EHF	1 mm		241.000 – 248.000 GHz		Secondary	Entire amateur radio band
EHF	1 mm		248.000 – 250.000 GHz		Primary	Entire amateur radio band

== See also ==
- List of amateur radio frequency bands in India

Range	Band	ITU Region 1	ITU Region 2	ITU Region 3
LF	2200 m	135.7–137.8 kHz		
MF	630 m	472–479 kHz		
MF	160 m	1.810–1.850 MHz	1.800–2.000 MHz	
HF	80 / 75 m	3.500–3.800 MHz	3.500–4.000 MHz	3.500–3.900 MHz
HF	60 m	5.3515–5.3665 MHz		
HF	40 m	7.000–7.200 MHz	7.000–7.300 MHz	7.000–7.200 MHz
HF	30 m^{[t2]}	10.100–10.150 MHz		
HF	20 m	14.000–14.350 MHz		
HF	17 m^{[t2]}	18.068–18.168 MHz		
HF	15 m	21.000–21.450 MHz		
HF	12 m^{[t2]}	24.890–24.990 MHz		
HF	10 m	28.000–29.700 MHz		
VHF	8 m^{[t3]}	40.000–40.700 MHz	—N/a	
VHF	6 m	50.000–52.000 MHz (50.000–54.000 MHz)^{[t4]}	50.000–54.000 MHz	
VHF	5 m^{[t3]}	58.000–60.100 MHz	—N/a	
VHF	4 m^{[t3]}	70.000–70.500 MHz	—N/a	
VHF	2 m	144.000–146.000 MHz	144.000–148.000 MHz	
VHF	1.25 m	—N/a	220.000–225.000 MHz	—N/a
UHF	70 cm	430.000–440.000 MHz	430.000–440.000 MHz (420.000–450.000 MHz)^{[t4]}	
UHF	33 cm	—N/a	902.000–928.000 MHz	—N/a
UHF	23 cm	1.240–1.300 GHz		
UHF	13 cm	2.300–2.450 GHz		
SHF	9 cm	3.400–3.475 GHz^{[t4]}	3.300–3.500 GHz	
SHF	5 cm	5.650–5.850 GHz	5.650–5.925 GHz	5.650–5.850 GHz
SHF	3 cm	10.000–10.500 GHz		
SHF	1.2 cm	24.000–24.250 GHz		
EHF	6 mm	47.000–47.200 GHz		
EHF	4 mm^{[t4]}	75.500 GHz^{[t3]} – 81.500 GHz	76.000–81.500 GHz	
EHF	2.5 mm	122.250–123.000 GHz		
EHF	2 mm	134.000–141.000 GHz		
EHF	1 mm	241.000–250.000 GHz		
THF	Sub-mm	Some administrations have authorized spectrum for amateur use in this region; others have declined to regulate frequencies above 300 GHz.		
[t1]	All allocations are subject to variation by country. For simplicity, only common allocations found internationally are listed. See a band's article for specifics.			
[t2]	HF allocation created at the 1979 World Administrative Radio Conference. These are commonly called the "WARC bands".			
[t3]	This is not mentioned in the ITU's Table of Frequency Allocations, but many individual administrations have commonly adopted this allocation under "Article 4.4".			
[t4]	This includes a currently active footnote allocation mentioned in the ITU's Table of Frequency Allocations. These allocations may only apply to a group of countries.			
See also: Radio spectrum, Electromagnetic spectrum
