= 160-meter band =

Amateur radio frequency band

160-meter band refers to the band of radio frequencies between 1.8 and 2 MHz, just above the medium wave broadcast band. For many decades the lowest radio frequency band allocated for use by amateur radio, before the adoption, at the beginning of the 21st century in most countries, of the 630- and 2200-meter bands. Amateur operators often refer to 160 meters as the Top Band (Note: "Top band" is a reference to it being, historically, the amateur band with the longest wavelengths.) It is also sometimes nicknamed the "Gentleman's Band" in contrast to the often-freewheeling activity in the 80-, 40- and 20-meter bands.

== Frequency allocations ==
The International Telecommunication Union currently allocates all frequencies from 1.81–2 MHz to amateur radio operations in ITU Region 1 (Europe, Greenland, Africa, the Middle East west of the Persian Gulf and including Iraq, the former Soviet Union and Mongolia) and 1.8–2 MHz in the rest of the world.

== History ==
The 160-meter band is the oldest amateur band and was the staple of reliable communication in the earliest days of amateur radio, when almost all communications were over relatively short distances, and typical operating frequencies were below 20 MHz.

In the UK 160 meters was the primary band used for mobile operation for many years. Despite many obstacles and threats from commercial and military radio, the efforts of a small number of determined 160-meter operators enabled the band allocation to survive.

=== Origin ===
The band was allocated on a worldwide basis by the International Radiotelegraph Conference in Washington, D.C., on 4 October 1927. The allocation at that time was 1.715–2 MHz.

=== Cut-backs ===
The International Radio Conference of Atlantic City reduced the allocation to 1.8–2 MHz under the provision that amateurs must not interfere with LORAN operation.

As the high frequency (HF) bands were developed in mid-1920s – along with their smaller, more feasible antennas – 160 meters fell into a period of relative disuse. Although there has always been activity on the band, fewer and fewer hams are willing (or able, due to lack of sufficient real estate) to put up the antennas necessary to take advantage of the band's unique properties. For most amateurs, the HF bands are much easier to use, and HF antennas require less real estate.

During World War II all amateur radio licenses were suspended, prohibiting amateur transmission on any radio band.

=== Gradual restoration ===
After World War II, it first seemed that the 160-meter band was not coming back, since a large part of the U.S. 160-meter band was allocated on a primary basis to the LORAN radio-navigation system that began operating in and around the 160-meter band in 1942. Amateurs were relegated to secondary, non-interfering status, with severe regional power limitations and restricted day/night operations on just a few narrow segments of the band.

Many older hams recall, with no great fondness, the ear-shattering buzz-saw racket of high power LORAN stations that began in 1942 until LORAN-A was phased out in North America on 31 December 1980, and most of the world by 1985. LORAN-A was still operating in China and Japan in 1995. Great ingenuity was used to eliminate the pulse noise of the powerful LORAN-A transmitters through such famous circuitry as the "Select-O-Ject" of the late 1950s. The technology was adapted to modern noise blanking circuits used in current amateur receivers and transceivers.

=== Current ===
The band experienced a resurgence with the demise of LORAN-A in the United States in December 1980, and the removal of power restrictions below 1.9 MHz soon thereafter. Power restrictions above 1.9 MHz were removed in March 1984, and 160 meters was then no longer regarded as the "abandoned" band, as it had been for more than half a century. Also, with the 21st century allocation of two more bands at lower frequencies, 160 meters is no longer the only mediumwave band, and no longer the lowest-frequency amateur band.

== Technical characteristics ==
160 meters is populated by many dedicated experimenters, as it is a proving ground for ingenuity in antenna design and operating technique. It also serves as a "training-ground" for the 630m and 2200m bands, where logistical and technical demands are even more extreme.

=== Size, power, and safety ===
Effective operation on 160 meters can be more challenging than most other amateur bands, because of the overwhelmingly large sizes required for efficient antennas. Full-sized antennas (on the order of a quarter-wavelength or more) are over 130 feet for monopoles, which is also the recommended height for mounting a horizontal dipole antenna, and half-square loops reach nearly 70 feet high. That much real estate may not be feasible for many amateurs, and even with space available, erecting and securing such a large structure is a challenge.

The size of the safety zone around an antenna depends on several factors, including the power fed to the antenna, but is roughly 30–40 m (100–130 ft) from the center of the lowest radiating part of the antenna. If high power is used to compensate for an under-sized antenna, even a small antenna will require a full-sized safety zone around it, free of people and animals. Nevertheless, many radio amateurs successfully communicate over very long distances with relatively small antennas.

=== Propagation ===
During the day propagation is limited to local contacts, but long distance contacts are possible at night, especially around sunrise and sunset and during periods of sunspot minima.

Much about ionospheric and propagation on 160 meters is still not completely understood. Phenomena such as "chordal hop" propagation are frequently observed, as well as other unexplained long-distance propagation mechanisms. Inexplicable radio blackouts occur on 160 meters – sometimes also on the AM broadcast band. Many of these phenomena have been investigated in the scientific community also.

== See also ==
- Shortwave bands

== Notes ==
Range	Band	ITU Region 1	ITU Region 2	ITU Region 3
LF	2200 m	135.7–137.8 kHz		
MF	630 m	472–479 kHz		
MF	160 m	1.810–1.850 MHz	1.800–2.000 MHz	
HF	80 / 75 m	3.500–3.800 MHz	3.500–4.000 MHz	3.500–3.900 MHz
HF	60 m	5.3515–5.3665 MHz		
HF	40 m	7.000–7.200 MHz	7.000–7.300 MHz	7.000–7.200 MHz
HF	30 m^{[t2]}	10.100–10.150 MHz		
HF	20 m	14.000–14.350 MHz		
HF	17 m^{[t2]}	18.068–18.168 MHz		
HF	15 m	21.000–21.450 MHz		
HF	12 m^{[t2]}	24.890–24.990 MHz		
HF	10 m	28.000–29.700 MHz		
VHF	8 m^{[t3]}	40.000–40.700 MHz	—	
VHF	6 m	50.000–52.000 MHz (50.000–54.000 MHz)^{[t4]}	50.000–54.000 MHz	
VHF	5 m^{[t3]}	58.000–60.100 MHz	—	
VHF	4 m^{[t3]}	70.000–70.500 MHz	—	
VHF	2 m	144.000–146.000 MHz	144.000–148.000 MHz	
VHF	1.25 m	—	220.000–225.000 MHz	—
UHF	70 cm	430.000–440.000 MHz	430.000–440.000 MHz (420.000–450.000 MHz)^{[t4]}	
UHF	33 cm	—	902.000–928.000 MHz	—
UHF	23 cm	1.240–1.300 GHz		
UHF	13 cm	2.300–2.450 GHz		
SHF	9 cm	3.400–3.475 GHz^{[t4]}	3.300–3.500 GHz	
SHF	5 cm	5.650–5.850 GHz	5.650–5.925 GHz	5.650–5.850 GHz
SHF	3 cm	10.000–10.500 GHz		
SHF	1.2 cm	24.000–24.250 GHz		
EHF	6 mm	47.000–47.200 GHz		
EHF	4 mm^{[t4]}	75.500 GHz^{[t3]} – 81.500 GHz	76.000–81.500 GHz	
EHF	2.5 mm	122.250–123.000 GHz		
EHF	2 mm	134.000–141.000 GHz		
EHF	1 mm	241.000–250.000 GHz		
THF	Sub-mm	Some administrations have authorized spectrum for amateur use in this region; others have declined to regulate frequencies above 300 GHz.		
[t1]	All allocations are subject to variation by country. For simplicity, only common allocations found internationally are listed. See a band's article for specifics.			
[t2]	HF allocation created at the 1979 World Administrative Radio Conference. These are commonly called the "WARC bands".			
[t3]	This is not mentioned in the ITU's Table of Frequency Allocations, but many individual administrations have commonly adopted this allocation under "Article 4.4".			
[t4]	This includes a currently active footnote allocation mentioned in the ITU's Table of Frequency Allocations. These allocations may only apply to a group of countries.			
See also: Radio spectrum, Electromagnetic spectrum
