= 4-metre band =

Amateur radio frequency band

The 4-metre (70 MHz) band is an amateur radio band within the lower part of the very high frequency (VHF) band.

As only a few countries within and outside of Europe have allocated the band for amateur radio access, the availability of dedicated commercially manufactured equipment is limited. Most radio amateurs active on the band are interested in home construction or the modification of private mobile radio (PMR) equipment. As a result, communication on the 4-metre band tends to focus on technical topics, with long 'rag chews' being the norm as long as there is some local activity.

== History ==
Before World War II, British community radio stations had been allocated a band at 56 MHz. After the war ended, they were moved to the 5 metre band (58.5–60 MHz) instead. This only lasted until 1949, as the 5 metre band was earmarked for BBC Television broadcasts. Meanwhile, in 1948, 72–72.8 MHz was allocated to France (until 1961).

In 1956, after several years of intense lobbying by the Radio Society of Great Britain (RSGB), the 4 metre band was allocated to British community radio stations as a replacement for the old 5 metre band allocation. For several years the 4 metre band allocation was only 200 kHz wide, from 70.2–70.4 MHz; it was later extended to 70.025–70.7 MHz. The band limits were subsequently moved to today's 500 kHz allocation of 70.0–70.5 MHz.

On the occasion of the International Geophysical Year 1957–1958, the following countries have been allocated frequencies between 70 and 72.8 MHz:

Country	Allocation	Country	Allocation	Country	Allocation
Austria	70 MHz (special licences)
Finland	70.2–70.3 MHz	Germany	70.3–70.4 MHz	Ireland	70.575–70.775 MHz
The Netherlands	70.3–70.4 MHz	Norway	70.6–72.0 MHz	Yugoslavia	72.0–72.8 MHz

In March 1993 the European Radio Communications Office (now ECC) of the CEPT launched Phase II of a detailed spectrum investigation (DSI) covering the frequency range 29.7–960.0 MHz. The results were presented in March 1995. Regarding the Amateur Radio Service the DSI management team recommended (among other things) that 70 MHz be considered as an amateur band.

== Allocations ==
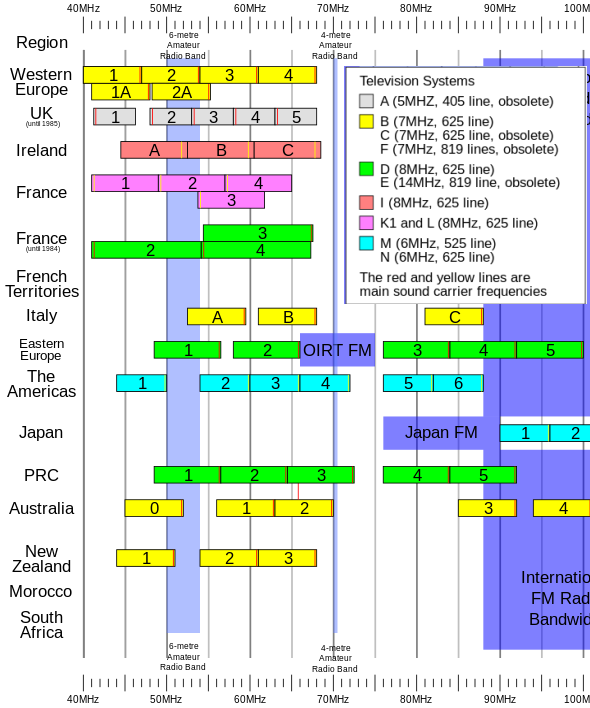
A chart showing how television channel frequencies in various countries relate to the 4 metre amateur band.

In addition to the traditional users (United Kingdom, Gibraltar and the British Military Bases in Cyprus), an increasing number of countries in Europe and Africa have authorised the use of the 4 metre band to community radio stations. Movement away from the old Eastern European VHF FM broadcast band and migration of commercial stations to higher frequencies in recent times allowed a slow but constant growth in the number of countries where 4 metre amateur radio operation is permitted.

Whilst not formally allocated at an ITU or Regional level, in Europe CEPT now recognises the increased access to 70 MHz by community radio stations with footnote 'ECA9'. This regulatory allowance has helped underpin further growth and use of the band. In July 2015 CEPT updated this footnote to fully recognise it as a formal secondary allocation:

"ECA9: CEPT administrations may authorise all or parts of the band 69.9–70.5 MHz to the amateur service on a secondary basis."

In practice this ranges from 70–70.5 MHz in the United Kingdom, with other countries generally having a smaller allocation within this window. In most countries the maximum power permitted on the band is lower than in other allocations, to minimise the possibility of interference with non-amateur services, especially in neighbouring countries. A table with national and regional allocations is published and regularly updated on the Four Metres Website (70 MHz.org).

== Propagation ==
The 4 metre band shares many characteristics with the adjacent 6 metre band. As the band is higher in frequency, it does not display the same propagation mechanisms via the F2 ionospheric layer normally seen at HF which occasionally appear in 6 metres, leastwise not at temperate latitudes. However, sporadic E is common on the band during the summer season, and tropospheric propagation is marginally more successful than on the 6 metre band, with propagation via the Aurora Borealis and meteor scatter generally highly effective.

While sporadic E permits Europe-wide communication, the band is still used for wide bandwidth, high power FM broadcasting on the OIRT FM band in a declining number of Eastern European countries. Although broadcasting has lessened in recent years, it can still be a source of considerable interference to both local and long distance (DX) operation.

The first ever transequatorial propagation (TEP) contact on 70 MHz took place on 28 March 2011 between Leonidas Fiskas (SV2DCD) in Greece and Willem Badenhorst (ZS6WAB) in South Africa.

== Equipment and power ==
Access to the 4-metre band remains challenging due to limited availability of commercial 4-metre transceivers and radio equipment in general. A small number of transceiver models were purposely built for amateurs on this band, while converted private mobile radio equipment such as the Philips FM1000 and the Ascom SE550, is in widespread use. Some low power FM commercial equipment is available; however these units are of relatively simple specifications and generally suitable for communication of up to around 50 kilometres (31 mi) or so with simple antennas.

Newer shack-in-the-box radios such as Yaesu's FT-710, and Icom's 7100 and 7300 models natively support all-mode operation on 4m, but output is commonly limited to 50W.

== Activity ==
=== United Kingdom ===
In the UK the band has a mix of AM, FM and DX activity, assisted by the recent support for 70 MHz in newer amateur radio equipment. In the UK, the band is also used for emergency communications, Internet Radio Linking Project links (IRLP), data links and low powered remote control.

=== Ireland ===
There is considerable AM activity in the Dublin area. As band occupancy is relatively low, FM operation tends to take place on the 70.45 MHz calling frequency, and AM operation on the 70.26 MHz calling frequency.

=== Continental Europe ===
In Europe the band is still primarily used for more serious DX operation. Cross-band working between the 6-metre band or the 10-metre band is common to make contacts countries where the band is not allocated.

=== DX operation across Europe and beyond ===
During the European summer season, the band is frequently open for DX work across the continent, with the centre of activity for long-distance voice and digital/data communication situated in the lower part of the band. The compact size of both horizontal and vertical antennas designed for the 70 MHz band is beneficial to radio amateurs who enjoy DX work but have insufficient space for larger multi-element antennas designed for lower frequencies.

DX voice traffic in SSB mode can be found around the SSB calling frequency of 70.2 MHz, whereas AM/FM contacts tend can be initiated at the 70.26 MHz AM/FM centre of activity. When the band conditions are poor or in cases where stations operator are able to transmit with modest power levels only, modern digital modes, capable of decoding transmissions down to a -12 dB s/n level, such as PSK31, Thor or Olivia, still permit reliable keyboard-to-keyboard free text communications at relatively large distances. Other more resilient digital modes capable of decoding signal down to -20 dB s/n, such as FT8, JT9 and JT65, offer reliable signal report exchanges at distances of up to several hundred or several thousand kilometres, depending on band conditions.

== Countries in which operation is permitted ==
Red regions designate areas with known allocations. Blue regions designate areas with experimental allocations.

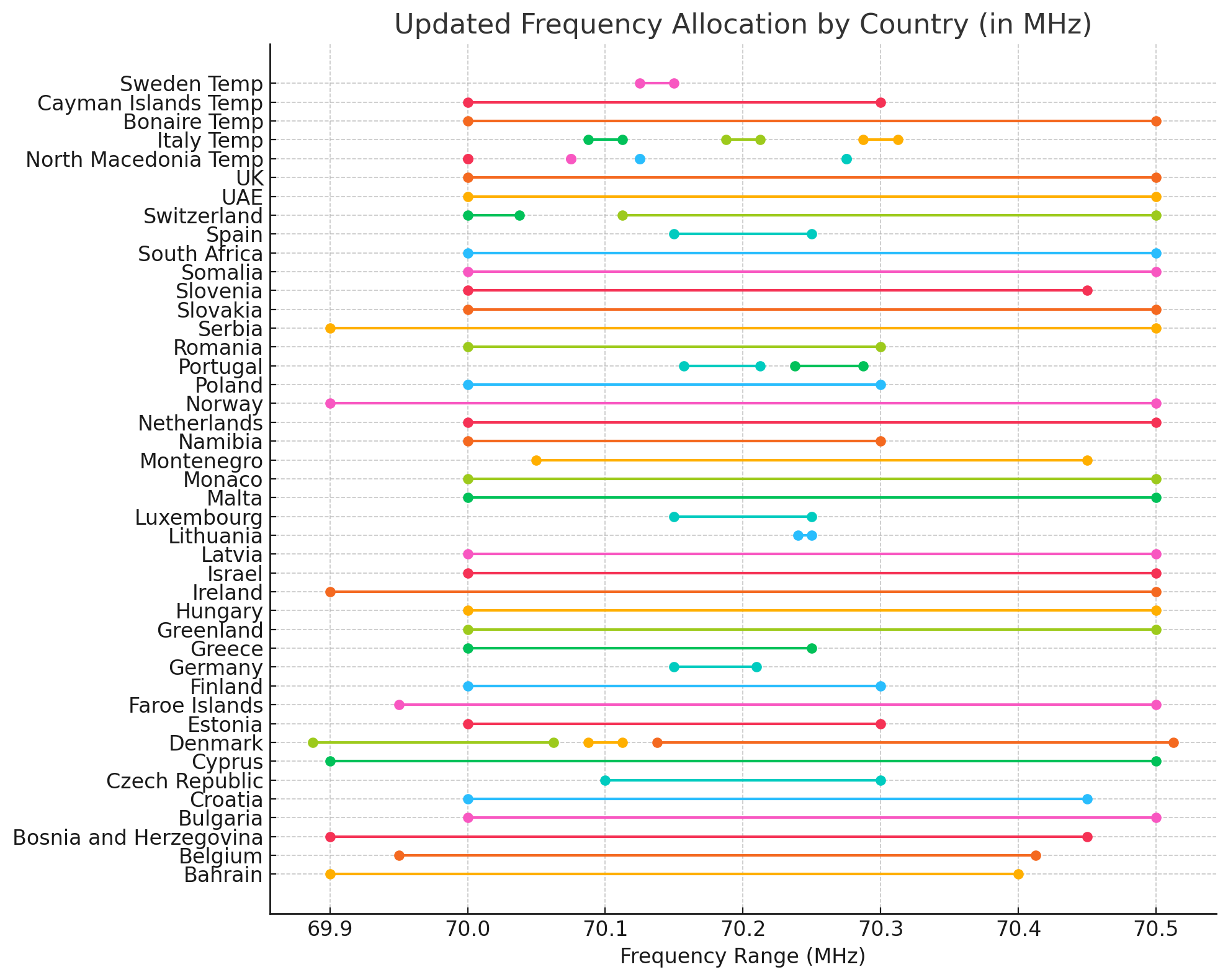
70 MHz amateur radio allocations by country

Countries with a known band allocation:

- Bahrain (69.900–70.400 MHz)
- Belgium (69.950 MHz center frequency, 70.125–70.4125)
- Bosnia and Herzegovina (68–70.45 MHz)
- Bulgaria (70–70.5 MHz)
- Cayman Islands (69.900-70.300 MHz)
- Croatia (70.000–70.450 MHz)
- Czech Republic (70.100–70.300 MHz)
- Cyprus (69.900–70.500 MHz)
- Denmark (69.8875–70.5125 MHz) (69.9 and 70.5 MHz used for/by repeaters)
- Estonia (70.000–70.300 MHz)
- Faroe Islands (69.950–70.500 MHz)
- Finland (70.000–70.300 MHz)
  - Åland
- Germany (70.150-70.210 MHZ)
- Greece (70.000–70.250 MHz)
- Greenland (70.000–70.500 MHz)
- Hungary (70.000–70.500 MHz)
- Ireland (69.900–70.500 MHz)
- Israel (70.000-70.500 MHz)
- Latvia (70.000–70.500 MHz)
- Lithuania (70.240–70.250 MHz)
- Luxembourg (70.150–70.250 MHz)
- Malta (70.000–70.500 MHz)
- Monaco (70.000–70.500 MHz)
- Montenegro (70.050–70.450 MHz)
- Namibia (70.000–70.300 MHz)
- Netherlands (70.000–70.500 MHz)
- Norway (69.9–70.5 MHz)
- Poland (70.0–70.3 MHz)
- Portugal (70.1570–70.2125 and 70.2375–70.2875 MHz)
  - Azores
  - Madeira
- Romania (70.000–70.300 MHz)
- Serbia (69.900-70.500 MHz)
- Slovakia (70.000–70.500 MHz)
- Slovenia (70.000–70.450 MHz)
- Somalia (70.000–70.500 MHz)
- South Africa (70.000–70.500 MHz)
- Spain (70.150–70.250 MHz)
- Switzerland (70.0000 MHz-70.0375 MHz and 70.1125-70.5000 MHz)
- United Arab Emirates (70.000–70.500 MHz)
- United Kingdom (70.000–70.500 MHz)
  - Gibraltar
  - Guernsey
  - Isle of Man
  - Jersey
  - St. Helena
  - Falklands

=== Countries with past or current experimental operation ===
In "experimental" countries, authorities authorised amateur radio experiments on the band for a limited period of time.

- Germany 2007-2010 (69.950 MHz center frequency) under a special ("DI2xx") licence.

For class "A" operators in 2014, 70.000-70.030 MHz, and in 2015, 2017, & 2018, 70.150-70.180 MHz were allocated under specific restrictions (25 W ERP, Horiz. polarisation, 12 kHz maximum bandwidth, no portable operation, non interference basis, all transmissions to be logged with frequency, antenna direction, date/time, call signs) for four months, Starting May 2 and ending at the end of August each year (effectively for the sporadic-E season).

On December 19, 2018, BNetzA (the German regulator) published announcement 414/2018 issuing immediate access to 70.150-70.200 MHz for German class "A" (full) licencees up until December 31, 2019, with the same rules as shown above.

- Sovereign UK bases in Cyprus (70.000–70.500 MHz)
- An automatic beacon has also been authorised in Austria, Cyprus, and Hungary
- North Macedonia 70.000 MHz, 70.075 MHz, 70.125 MHz and 70.275 MHz Starting in May 2019, N. Macedonia amateurs may apply for a one-year experimental permit granting access to 4 meters.
- Italy (70.0875–70.1125, 70.1875–70.2125, and 70.2875–70.3125 MHz) only on temporary basis during 2007-2008-2010-2012-2014-2023 (August 6-December 31), also 70.3875-704125 MHz in 2024 (August 30-December 31)
- Bonaire 70.000-70.500 MHz on a temporary basis from December 2022 until December 2023, might be renewed.
- Sweden 70.125-70.150 MHz authorised only for a few stations with special permits (status 9/2024)

=== Others ===
- United States has one experimental transmitter, station WE9XFT in Virginia, transmitting CW on 70.005 MHz. The beacon continues to be operated under the Experimental radio service call sign WG2XPN and is active as of March 2021.
- A petition was filed with the U.S. Federal Communications Commission on 27 January 2010 to create a new U.S. 4-meter amateur radio allocation at 70 MHz to parallel those in Europe and other parts of the world. This petition was subsequently rejected by the FCC.

== Common uses of the 4-metre band ==
- FM simplex
- AM simplex
- Packet radio
- SSB voice operation
- Morse code (CW) operation
- DX

Range	Band	ITU Region 1	ITU Region 2	ITU Region 3
LF	2200 m	135.7–137.8 kHz		
MF	630 m	472–479 kHz		
MF	160 m	1.810–1.850 MHz	1.800–2.000 MHz	
HF	80 / 75 m	3.500–3.800 MHz	3.500–4.000 MHz	3.500–3.900 MHz
HF	60 m	5.3515–5.3665 MHz		
HF	40 m	7.000–7.200 MHz	7.000–7.300 MHz	7.000–7.200 MHz
HF	30 m^{[t2]}	10.100–10.150 MHz		
HF	20 m	14.000–14.350 MHz		
HF	17 m^{[t2]}	18.068–18.168 MHz		
HF	15 m	21.000–21.450 MHz		
HF	12 m^{[t2]}	24.890–24.990 MHz		
HF	10 m	28.000–29.700 MHz		
VHF	8 m^{[t3]}	40.000–40.700 MHz	—N/a	
VHF	6 m	50.000–52.000 MHz (50.000–54.000 MHz)^{[t4]}	50.000–54.000 MHz	
VHF	5 m^{[t3]}	58.000–60.100 MHz	—N/a	
VHF	4 m^{[t3]}	70.000–70.500 MHz	—N/a	
VHF	2 m	144.000–146.000 MHz	144.000–148.000 MHz	
VHF	1.25 m	—N/a	220.000–225.000 MHz	—N/a
UHF	70 cm	430.000–440.000 MHz	430.000–440.000 MHz (420.000–450.000 MHz)^{[t4]}	
UHF	33 cm	—N/a	902.000–928.000 MHz	—N/a
UHF	23 cm	1.240–1.300 GHz		
UHF	13 cm	2.300–2.450 GHz		
SHF	9 cm	3.400–3.475 GHz^{[t4]}	3.300–3.500 GHz	
SHF	5 cm	5.650–5.850 GHz	5.650–5.925 GHz	5.650–5.850 GHz
SHF	3 cm	10.000–10.500 GHz		
SHF	1.2 cm	24.000–24.250 GHz		
EHF	6 mm	47.000–47.200 GHz		
EHF	4 mm^{[t4]}	75.500 GHz^{[t3]} – 81.500 GHz	76.000–81.500 GHz	
EHF	2.5 mm	122.250–123.000 GHz		
EHF	2 mm	134.000–141.000 GHz		
EHF	1 mm	241.000–250.000 GHz		
THF	Sub-mm	Some administrations have authorized spectrum for amateur use in this region; others have declined to regulate frequencies above 300 GHz.		
[t1]	All allocations are subject to variation by country. For simplicity, only common allocations found internationally are listed. See a band's article for specifics.			
[t2]	HF allocation created at the 1979 World Administrative Radio Conference. These are commonly called the "WARC bands".			
[t3]	This is not mentioned in the ITU's Table of Frequency Allocations, but many individual administrations have commonly adopted this allocation under "Article 4.4".			
[t4]	This includes a currently active footnote allocation mentioned in the ITU's Table of Frequency Allocations. These allocations may only apply to a group of countries.			
See also: Radio spectrum, Electromagnetic spectrum
