= 6-millimeter band =

Amateur radio frequency band

The 6-millimeter or 47 GHz band is a portion of the EHF (microwave) radio spectrum internationally allocated to amateur radio and amateur satellite use between 47.0 GHz and 47.2 GHz.

Due to the lack of commercial off the shelf radios, amateurs who operate on the 6 mm band must design and construct their own equipment. Amateurs often use the band to experiment with the maximum communication distance they can achieve, and they also use it occasionally for radio contesting. In some areas, amateurs maintain 47 GHz propagation beacons on mountain tops. The band has been successfully used by amateurs in moon bounce contacts.

== Allocation ==
The International Telecommunication Union allocates 47.0 GHz to 47.2 GHz to amateur radio and amateur satellites on a primary basis in all three ITU regions.

It is the only EHF band amateurs do not share with other radio services, and it is the only band above 2 meters which is exclusively for the amateur services in its entirety.

== List of notable frequencies ==
- 47.0882 GHz Narrow band calling frequency
- 47.088 GHz Propagation beacons

== Distance records ==
The current world distance record on the 6 mm band was 344.8 kilometres (214.2 mi) set by US stations AD6FP and W6QIW on September 19, 2015.

The longest distance achieved on 6 mm in the United Kingdom was 203 kilometres (126 mi) between stations GM7MRF / GM0HNW and GW0IVA on October 21, 2001.

In Australia, the 6 mm distance record was 181.2 kilometres (112.6 mi) set by stations VK5KK/3 and VK5ZD/3 on November 14, 2019.

The 6 mm Earth-Moon-Earth record was 9,967 kilometres (6,193 mi) set by stations AD6FP and RW3BP on January 23, 2005.

== See also ==
- Amateur radio frequency allocations

Range	Band	ITU Region 1	ITU Region 2	ITU Region 3
LF	2200 m	135.7–137.8 kHz		
MF	630 m	472–479 kHz		
MF	160 m	1.810–1.850 MHz	1.800–2.000 MHz	
HF	80 / 75 m	3.500–3.800 MHz	3.500–4.000 MHz	3.500–3.900 MHz
HF	60 m	5.3515–5.3665 MHz		
HF	40 m	7.000–7.200 MHz	7.000–7.300 MHz	7.000–7.200 MHz
HF	30 m^{[t2]}	10.100–10.150 MHz		
HF	20 m	14.000–14.350 MHz		
HF	17 m^{[t2]}	18.068–18.168 MHz		
HF	15 m	21.000–21.450 MHz		
HF	12 m^{[t2]}	24.890–24.990 MHz		
HF	10 m	28.000–29.700 MHz		
VHF	8 m^{[t3]}	40.000–40.700 MHz	—	
VHF	6 m	50.000–52.000 MHz (50.000–54.000 MHz)^{[t4]}	50.000–54.000 MHz	
VHF	5 m^{[t3]}	58.000–60.100 MHz	—	
VHF	4 m^{[t3]}	70.000–70.500 MHz	—	
VHF	2 m	144.000–146.000 MHz	144.000–148.000 MHz	
VHF	1.25 m	—	220.000–225.000 MHz	—
UHF	70 cm	430.000–440.000 MHz	430.000–440.000 MHz (420.000–450.000 MHz)^{[t4]}	
UHF	33 cm	—	902.000–928.000 MHz	—
UHF	23 cm	1.240–1.300 GHz		
UHF	13 cm	2.300–2.450 GHz		
SHF	9 cm	3.400–3.475 GHz^{[t4]}	3.300–3.500 GHz	
SHF	5 cm	5.650–5.850 GHz	5.650–5.925 GHz	5.650–5.850 GHz
SHF	3 cm	10.000–10.500 GHz		
SHF	1.2 cm	24.000–24.250 GHz		
EHF	6 mm	47.000–47.200 GHz		
EHF	4 mm^{[t4]}	75.500 GHz^{[t3]} – 81.500 GHz	76.000–81.500 GHz	
EHF	2.5 mm	122.250–123.000 GHz		
EHF	2 mm	134.000–141.000 GHz		
EHF	1 mm	241.000–250.000 GHz		
THF	Sub-mm	Some administrations have authorized spectrum for amateur use in this region; others have declined to regulate frequencies above 300 GHz.		
[t1]	All allocations are subject to variation by country. For simplicity, only common allocations found internationally are listed. See a band's article for specifics.			
[t2]	HF allocation created at the 1979 World Administrative Radio Conference. These are commonly called the "WARC bands".			
[t3]	This is not mentioned in the ITU's Table of Frequency Allocations, but many individual administrations have commonly adopted this allocation under "Article 4.4".			
[t4]	This includes a currently active footnote allocation mentioned in the ITU's Table of Frequency Allocations. These allocations may only apply to a group of countries.			
See also: Radio spectrum, Electromagnetic spectrum
