= 15-meter band =

Amateur radio frequency band

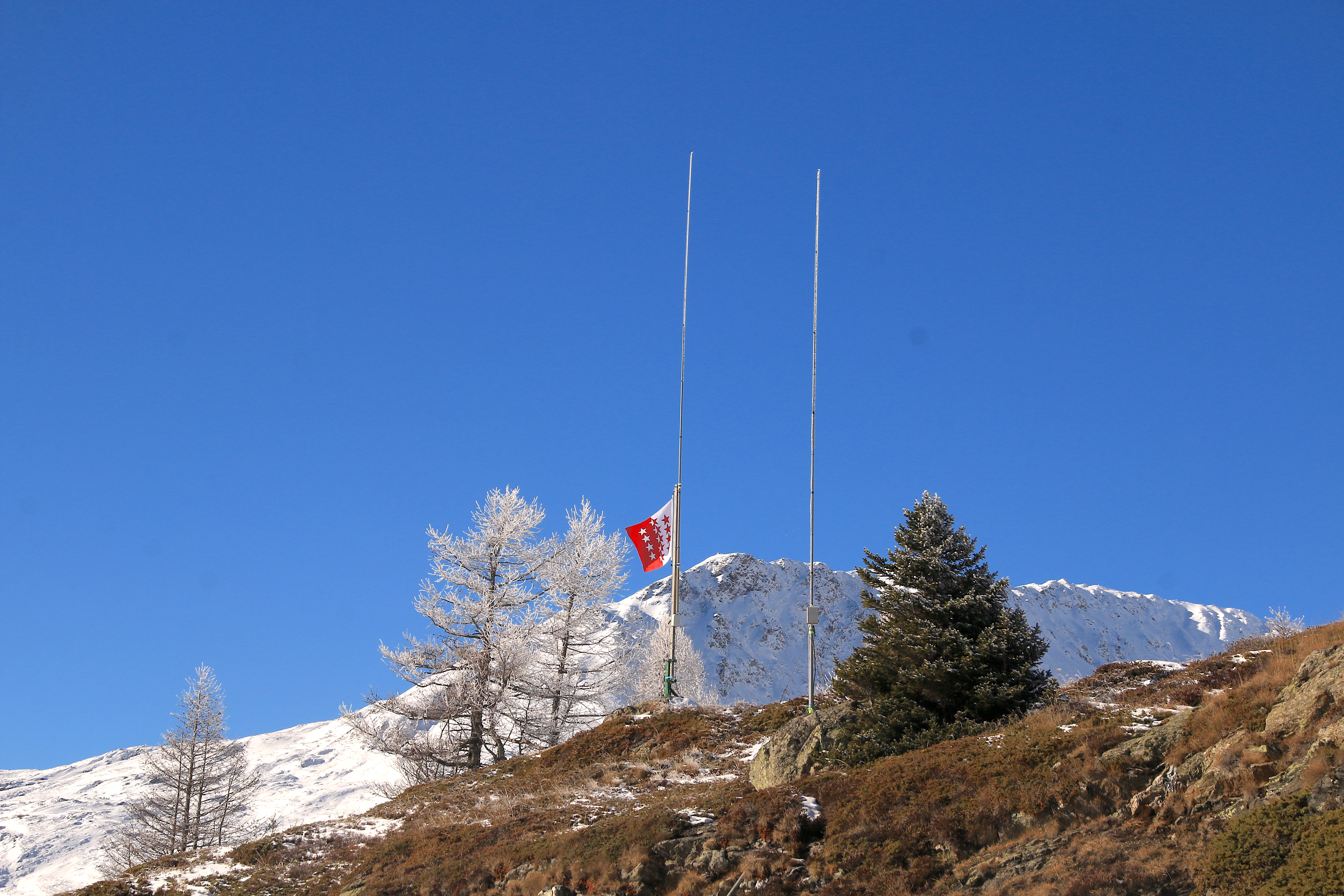
Right a HB9XBG vertical antenna for the 15-meter band. (Left a HB9XBG antenna for the 20 m band)

The 15-meter band (also called the 21-MHz band or 15 meters) is an amateur radio frequency band spanning the shortwave spectrum from 21 to 21.45 MHz. The band is suitable for amateur long-distance communications, and such use is permitted in nearly all countries.

Because 15-meter waves propagate primarily via reflection off of the F-2 layer of the ionosphere, the band is most useful for intercontinental communication during daylight hours, especially in years close to solar maxima, but the band permits long-distance without high-power station equipment outside such ideal windows. The 15-meter wavelength is harmonically related to that of the 40-meter band, so it is often possible to use an antenna designed for 40 meters.

== History ==
The 15-meter band was designated by the 1947 International Radio Conference of Atlantic City in part to compensate for the loss of the 160-meter band to amateurs by the introduction of LORAN during World War II. The 15-meter band opened to amateurs for CW operation only in the United States on May 1, 1952, and telephony operations were authorized above 21.25 MHz and Novice CW operations between 21.100 and 21.250 MHz on March 28, 1953.

== Frequency allocation ==
=== United States ===
Megahertz	21.000–21.025	21.025–21.200	21.200–21.225	21.225–21.275	21.275–21.450
Novice / Technician					
General					
Advanced					
Extra					

==== Key ====
= CW, RTTY and data (US: < 1 kHz bandwidth)
= CW, phone and image
= CW only (US Novice/Technician: 200 W PEP maximum TPO)

=== Canada ===
Canada is part of region 2 and as such is subject to the IARU band plan. Radio Amateurs of Canada offers the bandplan below as a recommendation for use by radio amateurs in that country but it does not have the force of law and should only be considered a suggestion or guideline.

License class	21.000-21.070	21.070-21.080	21.080-21.083	21.083-21.090	21.090-21.125	21.125-21.150	21.150-21.340	21.340-21.343	21.343-21.450
Basic(+), Advanced									

=== Japan ===
Changed on September 25, 2023.

License class	21.000–21.070	21.070–21.150	21.150–21.450
All Class			narrow-band All modes

==== Key ====
= CW only
= CW, narrow band digital ( <= 500 Hz )
= CW, narrow band digital ( <= 500 Hz ), wide band digital
= Beacons
= CW, phone
= CW, phone, image ( <= 2700 Hz )
= Digital only
= Phone only
= TV only

== See also ==
- Shortwave bands

Range	Band	ITU Region 1	ITU Region 2	ITU Region 3
LF	2200 m	135.7–137.8 kHz		
MF	630 m	472–479 kHz		
MF	160 m	1.810–1.850 MHz	1.800–2.000 MHz	
HF	80 / 75 m	3.500–3.800 MHz	3.500–4.000 MHz	3.500–3.900 MHz
HF	60 m	5.3515–5.3665 MHz		
HF	40 m	7.000–7.200 MHz	7.000–7.300 MHz	7.000–7.200 MHz
HF	30 m^{[t2]}	10.100–10.150 MHz		
HF	20 m	14.000–14.350 MHz		
HF	17 m^{[t2]}	18.068–18.168 MHz		
HF	15 m	21.000–21.450 MHz		
HF	12 m^{[t2]}	24.890–24.990 MHz		
HF	10 m	28.000–29.700 MHz		
VHF	8 m^{[t3]}	40.000–40.700 MHz	—N/a	
VHF	6 m	50.000–52.000 MHz (50.000–54.000 MHz)^{[t4]}	50.000–54.000 MHz	
VHF	5 m^{[t3]}	58.000–60.100 MHz	—N/a	
VHF	4 m^{[t3]}	70.000–70.500 MHz	—N/a	
VHF	2 m	144.000–146.000 MHz	144.000–148.000 MHz	
VHF	1.25 m	—N/a	220.000–225.000 MHz	—N/a
UHF	70 cm	430.000–440.000 MHz	430.000–440.000 MHz (420.000–450.000 MHz)^{[t4]}	
UHF	33 cm	—N/a	902.000–928.000 MHz	—N/a
UHF	23 cm	1.240–1.300 GHz		
UHF	13 cm	2.300–2.450 GHz		
SHF	9 cm	3.400–3.475 GHz^{[t4]}	3.300–3.500 GHz	
SHF	5 cm	5.650–5.850 GHz	5.650–5.925 GHz	5.650–5.850 GHz
SHF	3 cm	10.000–10.500 GHz		
SHF	1.2 cm	24.000–24.250 GHz		
EHF	6 mm	47.000–47.200 GHz		
EHF	4 mm^{[t4]}	75.500 GHz^{[t3]} – 81.500 GHz	76.000–81.500 GHz	
EHF	2.5 mm	122.250–123.000 GHz		
EHF	2 mm	134.000–141.000 GHz		
EHF	1 mm	241.000–250.000 GHz		
THF	Sub-mm	Some administrations have authorized spectrum for amateur use in this region; others have declined to regulate frequencies above 300 GHz.		
[t1]	All allocations are subject to variation by country. For simplicity, only common allocations found internationally are listed. See a band's article for specifics.			
[t2]	HF allocation created at the 1979 World Administrative Radio Conference. These are commonly called the "WARC bands".			
[t3]	This is not mentioned in the ITU's Table of Frequency Allocations, but many individual administrations have commonly adopted this allocation under "Article 4.4".			
[t4]	This includes a currently active footnote allocation mentioned in the ITU's Table of Frequency Allocations. These allocations may only apply to a group of countries.			
See also: Radio spectrum, Electromagnetic spectrum
