= 4-millimeter band =

Amateur radio frequency band

The 4-millimeter band is a portion of the EHF (microwave) radio spectrum internationally allocated to amateur radio and amateur satellite use. The band is between 75.5 GHz and 81.5 GHz, with some regional and national variations.

Due to the lack of commercial off the shelf radios, amateurs who operate on the 4 mm band must design and construct their own equipment. Amateurs often use the band to experiment with the maximum communication distance they can achieve, and they also use it occasionally for radio contesting.

Amateur radio shares the band with radio astronomy, vehicular radars for adaptive cruise control, and aircraft FOD detection radars.

== Allocation ==
The International Telecommunication Union allocates 76.0 GHz to 81.0 GHz to amateur radio, amateur satellites, radio astronomy and radiolocation (radar) and space research downlinks. Amateurs operate on a primary basis between 77.5 GHz and 78.0 GHz and on a secondary basis in the rest of the band. Also, 81.0 GHz to 81.5 GHz is allocated by ITU footnote 5.561A to the amateur and amateur-satellite services on a secondary basis. The ITU's allocations are the same in all three ITU regions.

Until 2006, 75.5 GHz to 76.0 GHz was also allocated by the ITU to amateurs on a primary basis. In response to this change, CEPT added footnote EU35 to the "European Common Allocation Table", which provides a continued allocation of this segment to European amateurs.

== List of notable frequencies ==
- 75,976.200 MHz Preferred narrow band calling frequency in CEPT countries
- 76,032.200 MHz Narrow band calling frequency in some countries
- 77,500.200 MHz Preferred narrow band calling frequency, outside the CEPT area

== Distance records ==
The current world distance record on the 4 mm band was 289 kilometres (180 mi) set by US stations AD6IW and KF6KVG / K6GZA on June 14, 2014.

The longest distance achieved on 4 mm in the United Kingdom was 129 kilometres (80 mi) between stations G8KQW and G8CUB on November 23, 2013.

In Australia, the 4 mm distance record was 170.1 kilometres (105.7 mi) set by stations VK4FB and VK4CSD on July 18, 2019.

== See also ==
- Amateur radio frequency allocations
- W band

Range	Band	ITU Region 1	ITU Region 2	ITU Region 3
LF	2200 m	135.7–137.8 kHz		
MF	630 m	472–479 kHz		
MF	160 m	1.810–1.850 MHz	1.800–2.000 MHz	
HF	80 / 75 m	3.500–3.800 MHz	3.500–4.000 MHz	3.500–3.900 MHz
HF	60 m	5.3515–5.3665 MHz		
HF	40 m	7.000–7.200 MHz	7.000–7.300 MHz	7.000–7.200 MHz
HF	30 m^{[t2]}	10.100–10.150 MHz		
HF	20 m	14.000–14.350 MHz		
HF	17 m^{[t2]}	18.068–18.168 MHz		
HF	15 m	21.000–21.450 MHz		
HF	12 m^{[t2]}	24.890–24.990 MHz		
HF	10 m	28.000–29.700 MHz		
VHF	8 m^{[t3]}	40.000–40.700 MHz	—N/a	
VHF	6 m	50.000–52.000 MHz (50.000–54.000 MHz)^{[t4]}	50.000–54.000 MHz	
VHF	5 m^{[t3]}	58.000–60.100 MHz	—N/a	
VHF	4 m^{[t3]}	70.000–70.500 MHz	—N/a	
VHF	2 m	144.000–146.000 MHz	144.000–148.000 MHz	
VHF	1.25 m	—N/a	220.000–225.000 MHz	—N/a
UHF	70 cm	430.000–440.000 MHz	430.000–440.000 MHz (420.000–450.000 MHz)^{[t4]}	
UHF	33 cm	—N/a	902.000–928.000 MHz	—N/a
UHF	23 cm	1.240–1.300 GHz		
UHF	13 cm	2.300–2.450 GHz		
SHF	9 cm	3.400–3.475 GHz^{[t4]}	3.300–3.500 GHz	
SHF	5 cm	5.650–5.850 GHz	5.650–5.925 GHz	5.650–5.850 GHz
SHF	3 cm	10.000–10.500 GHz		
SHF	1.2 cm	24.000–24.250 GHz		
EHF	6 mm	47.000–47.200 GHz		
EHF	4 mm^{[t4]}	75.500 GHz^{[t3]} – 81.500 GHz	76.000–81.500 GHz	
EHF	2.5 mm	122.250–123.000 GHz		
EHF	2 mm	134.000–141.000 GHz		
EHF	1 mm	241.000–250.000 GHz		
THF	Sub-mm	Some administrations have authorized spectrum for amateur use in this region; others have declined to regulate frequencies above 300 GHz.		
[t1]	All allocations are subject to variation by country. For simplicity, only common allocations found internationally are listed. See a band's article for specifics.			
[t2]	HF allocation created at the 1979 World Administrative Radio Conference. These are commonly called the "WARC bands".			
[t3]	This is not mentioned in the ITU's Table of Frequency Allocations, but many individual administrations have commonly adopted this allocation under "Article 4.4".			
[t4]	This includes a currently active footnote allocation mentioned in the ITU's Table of Frequency Allocations. These allocations may only apply to a group of countries.			
See also: Radio spectrum, Electromagnetic spectrum
