= 1-millimeter band =

Amateur radio frequency band

The 1-millimeter band is a portion of the EHF (microwave) radio spectrum internationally allocated to amateur radio and amateur satellite use. The band is between 241 GHz and 250 GHz.

Due to the lack of commercial off the shelf radios, amateurs who operate on the 1 mm band must design and construct their own equipment, and those who do, often attempt to set communication distance records for the band.

== Allocation ==
The International Telecommunication Union allocates 241 GHz to 250 GHz to amateur radio and amateur satellites. Amateurs operate on a primary basis between 248 GHz and 250 GHz and on a secondary basis in the rest of the band. As such, amateurs must protect the radio astronomy and radiolocation services from harmful interference, which share the band with amateurs between 241 GHz and 248 GHz. In addition, 244 GHz to 246 GHz is an ISM band, and all users must accept interference caused by ISM devices. The ITU's allocations are the same in all three ITU Regions.

== List of notable frequencies ==
- 245 GHz ISM band center frequency
- 248.000 to 248.001 GHz Satellite and narrow band modes

== Distance records ==
The current world distance record on the 1 mm band was 114 kilometres (71 mi) set by US stations WA1ZMS and W4WWQ on January 21, 2008.

The longest distance achieved on 1 mm in the United Kingdom was 9.33 kilometres (5.80 mi) between stations G0FDZ and G8CUB on April 30 2019.

In Australia, the 1 mm distance record was 10.8 kilometres (6.7 mi) set by stations VK3CV/3 and VK3NH/3 on August 5, 2024.

== See also ==
- Amateur radio frequency allocations

Range	Band	ITU Region 1	ITU Region 2	ITU Region 3
LF	2200 m	135.7–137.8 kHz		
MF	630 m	472–479 kHz		
MF	160 m	1.810–1.850 MHz	1.800–2.000 MHz	
HF	80 / 75 m	3.500–3.800 MHz	3.500–4.000 MHz	3.500–3.900 MHz
HF	60 m	5.3515–5.3665 MHz		
HF	40 m	7.000–7.200 MHz	7.000–7.300 MHz	7.000–7.200 MHz
HF	30 m^{[t2]}	10.100–10.150 MHz		
HF	20 m	14.000–14.350 MHz		
HF	17 m^{[t2]}	18.068–18.168 MHz		
HF	15 m	21.000–21.450 MHz		
HF	12 m^{[t2]}	24.890–24.990 MHz		
HF	10 m	28.000–29.700 MHz		
VHF	8 m^{[t3]}	40.000–40.700 MHz	—N/a	
VHF	6 m	50.000–52.000 MHz (50.000–54.000 MHz)^{[t4]}	50.000–54.000 MHz	
VHF	5 m^{[t3]}	58.000–60.100 MHz	—N/a	
VHF	4 m^{[t3]}	70.000–70.500 MHz	—N/a	
VHF	2 m	144.000–146.000 MHz	144.000–148.000 MHz	
VHF	1.25 m	—N/a	220.000–225.000 MHz	—N/a
UHF	70 cm	430.000–440.000 MHz	430.000–440.000 MHz (420.000–450.000 MHz)^{[t4]}	
UHF	33 cm	—N/a	902.000–928.000 MHz	—N/a
UHF	23 cm	1.240–1.300 GHz		
UHF	13 cm	2.300–2.450 GHz		
SHF	9 cm	3.400–3.475 GHz^{[t4]}	3.300–3.500 GHz	
SHF	5 cm	5.650–5.850 GHz	5.650–5.925 GHz	5.650–5.850 GHz
SHF	3 cm	10.000–10.500 GHz		
SHF	1.2 cm	24.000–24.250 GHz		
EHF	6 mm	47.000–47.200 GHz		
EHF	4 mm^{[t4]}	75.500 GHz^{[t3]} – 81.500 GHz	76.000–81.500 GHz	
EHF	2.5 mm	122.250–123.000 GHz		
EHF	2 mm	134.000–141.000 GHz		
EHF	1 mm	241.000–250.000 GHz		
THF	Sub-mm	Some administrations have authorized spectrum for amateur use in this region; others have declined to regulate frequencies above 300 GHz.		
[t1]	All allocations are subject to variation by country. For simplicity, only common allocations found internationally are listed. See a band's article for specifics.			
[t2]	HF allocation created at the 1979 World Administrative Radio Conference. These are commonly called the "WARC bands".			
[t3]	This is not mentioned in the ITU's Table of Frequency Allocations, but many individual administrations have commonly adopted this allocation under "Article 4.4".			
[t4]	This includes a currently active footnote allocation mentioned in the ITU's Table of Frequency Allocations. These allocations may only apply to a group of countries.			
See also: Radio spectrum, Electromagnetic spectrum
