= 2200-meter band =

Amateur radio frequency band

The 2200-meter or 136 kHz band is the lowest frequency band in which amateur radio operators are licensed to transmit. It was formally allocated to amateurs at the 2007 World Radiocommunication Conference (WRC-07). The band is available on a secondary basis in all ITU regions with the limitation that amateur stations have maximum radiated power of 1 watt effective isotropic radiated power.

The 2200-meter band is within the low frequency (LF) band, just below the 153–279 kHz longwave broadcast band. It is also referred to as the 2190-meter band.

== History ==
The International Telecommunication Union's 2007 World Radiocommunication Conference (WRC-07) in Geneva agreed a secondary allocation of 135.7–137.8 kHz to the Amateur Service on Friday 9 November 2007. Prior to the ITU formal allocation some countries did have access or predecessors at nearby frequencies. For example, in the UK, operation on the even lower frequency of 73 kHz had been allowed from 1996 until 2003. A small number of countries also have limited license-exempt use (LowFER).

== International frequency allocation ==
A number of European countries have already allocated the 135.7–137.8 kHz band to amateur radio use based on CEPT / ERC Recommendation 62-01 E ("Use of the band 135.7–137.8 kHz by the Amateur Service", Mainz 1997). The allocation is on a secondary basis, with a maximum ERP of 1 W. Otherwise the band 130–148.5 kHz is allocated on a primary base to the Maritime Mobile Service and the Fixed Service. The main users are naval one-way transmissions and radio-location systems.

== Technical issues ==
Such low frequency transmissions require specialized equipment – usually custom made. In countries where it is allowed, maximum radiated power is usually limited to 1 watt (0 dB_{W} or 30 dB_{mW}), but even this can be extremely difficult to achieve from practical equipment and antennas. Reception also poses problems due to considerable natural and man-made noise and interference (QRN and QRM).

Many users and experimenters have settled on extremely slow, computer-generated and displayed Morse code as the most common transmission mode. This mode is known as QRSS, where the doubling of the 'S' emphasises the extreme slowness. (The international Q code QRS means "Please send more slowly", "slow Morse" or "Morse,slowed" in radio jargon.)

== Band plan ==
The 2005 IARU Region 1 Conference defined the band as follows:

135.7–136.0 kHz
Station Tests and transatlantic reception window
136.0–137.4 kHz
Telegraphy
137.4–137.6 kHz
Non-Telegraphy digital modes
137.6–137.8 kHz
Very slow telegraphy centred on 137.7 kHz

== United States ==
In a Report and Order dated 27 March 2017, the FCC announced that amateur radio operators holding a General-class license or above would be allowed privileges on the 2200 m band with an ERP of 1 W, in accordance with the 2012 World Radiocommunication Conference (WRC-12).

On 15 September 2017 the Federal Communications Commission announced that all of the part 97 Amateur Radio Service rules adopted in WRC-12 / FCC 17–33 would now be in effect. It also reminded users that they needed to coordinate with the UTC out of concern for interference with Power Line Carrier systems.

As specified in 47 CFR 97.313(g)(2), prior to commencement of operations in the 135.7–137.8 kHz (2200 m) and/or 472–479 kHz (630 m) bands, amateur operators must notify the Utilities Telecom Council (UTC) of their intent to operate by submitting their call signs, intended band(s) of operation, and the coordinates of their antenna’s fixed location. Amateur stations will be permitted to commence operations after a 30 day period unless UTC notifies the station that its fixed location is within one kilometer of Power Line Carrier (PLC) systems operating on the same or overlapping frequencies. This notification process will ensure that amateur stations seeking to operate in the above noted bands are located beyond a minimum separation distance from PLC transmission lines, which will help ensure the compatibility and coexistence of amateur and PLC operations, and promote shared use of the bands.

Previously, in 1998, the FCC rejected an ARRL petition for LF allocations at 135.7–137.8 kHz and 160–190 kHz. In 2002, indications from the FCC had been that 136 kHz privileges would be authorized soon. On 14 May 2003, however, the FCC declined to grant these privileges citing concerns over potential interference with power line communications (PLC) systems operating unlicensed under Part 15 which are used by electrical utilities to send control through the power grid. But the FCC added that amateurs wishing to experiment with 136 kHz communications may apply for a Part 5 Experimental License or operate under Part 15 regulations for this part of the electromagnetic spectrum. In the case of Part 15, the field strength measured 300 meters from the antenna may not exceed 2,400 microvolts per meter divided by the frequency in kilohertz, or approximately 17 μV/m.

On 19 November 2012, the FCC issued a Notice of Proposed Rulemaking demonstrating intent to authorize the amateur service as a secondary user of the LF band between 135.7–137.8 kHz with a maximum EIRP of 1 watt. The notice seeks to reexamine the 2003 rejection citing the international allocation of the band in all ITU regions by WRC-07 and the lack of use by the primary allocation holders. The notice seeks further comment and empirical evidence regarding interference to PLC systems based on data collected by experimental licenses granted in the United States and by other stations around the world.

On 27 April 2015 the Federal Communications Commission announced a preliminary decision to permit amateur operation on a secondary basis from 135.7–137.8 kHz, at a maximum output of 1 watt EIRP.

== Countries in which operation is permitted ==
=== Countries with a known band allocation ===
- ITU region 1
  - Austria
  - Belgium
  - Bulgaria
  - Cyprus
  - Czech Republic
  - Denmark
  - Estonia
  - Finland
  - France
  - Germany
  - Greece
  - Hungary
  - Iceland
  - Ireland
  - Italy
  - Kenya
  - Lithuania
  - Netherlands
  - Norway
  - Poland
  - Romania
  - Russia
  - Spain
  - Sweden
  - Switzerland
  - Turkey
  - Ukraine
  - United Kingdom
  - Zimbabwe
- ITU Region 2
  - Argentina
  - Brazil: Brazilian amateurs received privileges on the band in August 2018.
  - Canada: Canadian amateurs received privileges on the band in December 2009.
  - French Overseas Departments and Territories in Region 2 (135.7–137.8 kHz)
    - Overseas Departments:
      - French Guiana
      - Guadeloupe
      - Martinique
    - Overseas collectivities:
      - Saint Barthélemy
      - Saint Martin
      - Saint Pierre and Miquelon
- ITU Region 3
  - Australia: The ACMA included the allocation of 135.7–137.8 kHz as a secondary service to Advanced License amateurs in the Australia RF Spectrum Plan which came into force on 1 January 2009.
  - People's Republic of China: The Ministry of Industry and Information Technology included the allocation of 135.7–137.8 kHz as a secondary service for amateur radio in Mainland China, up to 1 W EIRP is permitted. However, no frequency allocation exists in Hong Kong or Macau Amateurs radio operators in Mainland China with Type-B or C privileges can use 135.7–137.8 kHz with 1 W EIRP.
  - Taiwan: Following WRC-07, amateur radio is allocated as a secondary service within 135.7–137.8 kHz, up to 1 W EIRP is permitted in Taiwan.
  - Japan: Japanese Amateurs can use 135.7-137.8 kHz with 1 W EIRP as of 30 March 2009
  - New Zealand: Amateurs are allowed to operate anywhere between 130 kHz and 190 kHz with a radiated power not exceeding 5 watts EIRP
  - Philippines: Amateurs are allowed to operate between 135.7–137.8 kHz effective 30 August 2012

=== Countries with past or current experimental operation ===
- United States: The Federal Communications Commission (FCC) permitted licensed amateurs to apply for special Part 5 experimental licenses in the band.

== See also ==
- Amateur radio
- Amateur radio bands
- Low frequency
- LowFER
- List of amateur radio organizations
- List of amateur radio operating modes

Range	Band	ITU Region 1	ITU Region 2	ITU Region 3
LF	2200 m	135.7–137.8 kHz		
MF	630 m	472–479 kHz		
MF	160 m	1.810–1.850 MHz	1.800–2.000 MHz	
HF	80 / 75 m	3.500–3.800 MHz	3.500–4.000 MHz	3.500–3.900 MHz
HF	60 m	5.3515–5.3665 MHz		
HF	40 m	7.000–7.200 MHz	7.000–7.300 MHz	7.000–7.200 MHz
HF	30 m^{[t2]}	10.100–10.150 MHz		
HF	20 m	14.000–14.350 MHz		
HF	17 m^{[t2]}	18.068–18.168 MHz		
HF	15 m	21.000–21.450 MHz		
HF	12 m^{[t2]}	24.890–24.990 MHz		
HF	10 m	28.000–29.700 MHz		
VHF	8 m^{[t3]}	40.000–40.700 MHz	—N/a	
VHF	6 m	50.000–52.000 MHz (50.000–54.000 MHz)^{[t4]}	50.000–54.000 MHz	
VHF	5 m^{[t3]}	58.000–60.100 MHz	—N/a	
VHF	4 m^{[t3]}	70.000–70.500 MHz	—N/a	
VHF	2 m	144.000–146.000 MHz	144.000–148.000 MHz	
VHF	1.25 m	—N/a	220.000–225.000 MHz	—N/a
UHF	70 cm	430.000–440.000 MHz	430.000–440.000 MHz (420.000–450.000 MHz)^{[t4]}	
UHF	33 cm	—N/a	902.000–928.000 MHz	—N/a
UHF	23 cm	1.240–1.300 GHz		
UHF	13 cm	2.300–2.450 GHz		
SHF	9 cm	3.400–3.475 GHz^{[t4]}	3.300–3.500 GHz	
SHF	5 cm	5.650–5.850 GHz	5.650–5.925 GHz	5.650–5.850 GHz
SHF	3 cm	10.000–10.500 GHz		
SHF	1.2 cm	24.000–24.250 GHz		
EHF	6 mm	47.000–47.200 GHz		
EHF	4 mm^{[t4]}	75.500 GHz^{[t3]} – 81.500 GHz	76.000–81.500 GHz	
EHF	2.5 mm	122.250–123.000 GHz		
EHF	2 mm	134.000–141.000 GHz		
EHF	1 mm	241.000–250.000 GHz		
THF	Sub-mm	Some administrations have authorized spectrum for amateur use in this region; others have declined to regulate frequencies above 300 GHz.		
[t1]	All allocations are subject to variation by country. For simplicity, only common allocations found internationally are listed. See a band's article for specifics.			
[t2]	HF allocation created at the 1979 World Administrative Radio Conference. These are commonly called the "WARC bands".			
[t3]	This is not mentioned in the ITU's Table of Frequency Allocations, but many individual administrations have commonly adopted this allocation under "Article 4.4".			
[t4]	This includes a currently active footnote allocation mentioned in the ITU's Table of Frequency Allocations. These allocations may only apply to a group of countries.			
See also: Radio spectrum, Electromagnetic spectrum
