= 5-meter band =

Amateur radio frequency band

The 5-meter band (60 MHz) is the middle portion of the very high frequency (VHF) radio spectrum allocated to amateur radio use in some countries.

== History ==
On October 10, 1924, the 5-meter band (56–64 MHz) was first made available to amateurs in the United States by the Third National Radio Conference. On October 4, 1927, the band was allocated on a worldwide basis by the International Radiotelegraph Conference in Washington, D.C. 56–60 MHz was allocated for amateur and experimental use.

At the 1938 International Radiocommunication Conference in Cairo, television broadcasting was given priority in a portion of the 5- and 6-meter band in Europe. Television and low power stations, meaning those with less than 1 kW power, were allocated 56–58.5 MHz and amateurs, experimenters and low power stations were allocated 58.5–60 MHz in the European region. The conference maintained the 56–60 MHz allocation for other regions and allowed administrations in Europe latitude to allow amateurs to continue using 56–58.5 MHz.

In 1940, television channel 2 was reallocated to 60 MHz and TV channel 1 was moved to 50–56 MHz maintaining a gap for the 5-meter amateur band. When the US entered World War II, transmissions by amateur radio stations were suspended for the duration of the war. After the war, the 5-meter band was briefly reopened to amateurs from 56 to 60 MHz until March 1, 1946. For British and some European amateurs were allocated the 5-meter band (58.5 MHz to 60 MHz) till 1949–1951, as by then the 5-meter band was given for television broadcasting.

But 1955-1962 due to TV channel allocations Australian and New Zealand (shorter time) authorities allocated 56-60 MHz instead 50 MHz, but for International Geophysical Year additionally again returned 50-54 MHz range.

Also around this time permission to YA1AA for 5-meter band in Afghanistan has been issued. In September 1957 (IGY) 56.5-58 MHz band allocated for local experiments in Romania, some UK stations in this range were heard.

Following a request to be able to track the progression of propagation openings DSI report (CEPT Phase II) of 1995 noted the possibility that a beacon's allocation at 60 MHz should be reassessed when TV broadcasting is no longer operating below 68 MHz of VHF Band I. From 2007 the IARU R1 is encouraging member societies to try and obtain small allocation for beacons cluster at 60 MHz. In Viena Interim conference 2019 accepted to add the 40 MHz and the 60 MHz Bandplan (used in some countries) in the VHF-Handbook as separate dedicated section. They can serve as an example for future use in other countries of Region 1.

== Allocations ==
- In January 1949 the 5-meter Band is removed from the amateur service (in some countries a transitional period up to 1951 was applied).
- 1955.11.01 - 1962.06.01 56-60 MHz band allocated for radio amateurs in Australia (VK).
- 1956.06.01 - 1959.01.31 56-60 MHz band allocated for radio amateurs in New Zealand (ZL) and overseas territories (ZK, ZM).
- In April 2018, Ireland (EI) allocated much of the low VHF spectrum to Irish radio amateurs including 60 MHz.

== Beacons ==
- In August 2007, the UK (G) approved the use of beacon at 60.050 MHz. Inactive from 2017.
- 2019.12.16 The Irish beacon EI1KNH started at 60.013 MHz 25 W, vertical dipole.
- 2022.09.25 The British beacon GB3MCB started at 60.3 MHz FT8/CW 5W, omnidirectional.

== Propagation ==
The 5-meter band shares many characteristics with the neighbouring 6-meter band and is a unique transition spot. However, as it is somewhat higher in frequency it does not display the same propagation mechanisms via the F2 ionospheric layer normally seen at HF which occasionally appear in 6 meters, leastwise not at temperate latitudes. However, Sporadic E is common on the band in summer, tropospheric propagation is marginally more successful than on the 6-meter band, and propagation via the aurora borealis and meteor scatter is highly effective.

== Activity ==
Around 1949, at least 18 countries worked in Europe on this band including Iceland and some overseas territories. A bit later from 1956 5-meter cross band (first VK-JA) and interstate Es activities take place in Australia, New Zealand and its overseas territories.

- 2019-08-29: Es EI4GNB - LY2YR FT8 2,036.3 km (1265 miles)
- 2022-05-18: Tropo EI9KP - EI4GNB FT8 ~205 km

Range	Band	ITU Region 1	ITU Region 2	ITU Region 3
LF	2200 m	135.7–137.8 kHz		
MF	630 m	472–479 kHz		
MF	160 m	1.810–1.850 MHz	1.800–2.000 MHz	
HF	80 / 75 m	3.500–3.800 MHz	3.500–4.000 MHz	3.500–3.900 MHz
HF	60 m	5.3515–5.3665 MHz		
HF	40 m	7.000–7.200 MHz	7.000–7.300 MHz	7.000–7.200 MHz
HF	30 m^{[t2]}	10.100–10.150 MHz		
HF	20 m	14.000–14.350 MHz		
HF	17 m^{[t2]}	18.068–18.168 MHz		
HF	15 m	21.000–21.450 MHz		
HF	12 m^{[t2]}	24.890–24.990 MHz		
HF	10 m	28.000–29.700 MHz		
VHF	8 m^{[t3]}	40.000–40.700 MHz	—N/a	
VHF	6 m	50.000–52.000 MHz (50.000–54.000 MHz)^{[t4]}	50.000–54.000 MHz	
VHF	5 m^{[t3]}	58.000–60.100 MHz	—N/a	
VHF	4 m^{[t3]}	70.000–70.500 MHz	—N/a	
VHF	2 m	144.000–146.000 MHz	144.000–148.000 MHz	
VHF	1.25 m	—N/a	220.000–225.000 MHz	—N/a
UHF	70 cm	430.000–440.000 MHz	430.000–440.000 MHz (420.000–450.000 MHz)^{[t4]}	
UHF	33 cm	—N/a	902.000–928.000 MHz	—N/a
UHF	23 cm	1.240–1.300 GHz		
UHF	13 cm	2.300–2.450 GHz		
SHF	9 cm	3.400–3.475 GHz^{[t4]}	3.300–3.500 GHz	
SHF	5 cm	5.650–5.850 GHz	5.650–5.925 GHz	5.650–5.850 GHz
SHF	3 cm	10.000–10.500 GHz		
SHF	1.2 cm	24.000–24.250 GHz		
EHF	6 mm	47.000–47.200 GHz		
EHF	4 mm^{[t4]}	75.500 GHz^{[t3]} – 81.500 GHz	76.000–81.500 GHz	
EHF	2.5 mm	122.250–123.000 GHz		
EHF	2 mm	134.000–141.000 GHz		
EHF	1 mm	241.000–250.000 GHz		
THF	Sub-mm	Some administrations have authorized spectrum for amateur use in this region; others have declined to regulate frequencies above 300 GHz.		
[t1]	All allocations are subject to variation by country. For simplicity, only common allocations found internationally are listed. See a band's article for specifics.			
[t2]	HF allocation created at the 1979 World Administrative Radio Conference. These are commonly called the "WARC bands".			
[t3]	This is not mentioned in the ITU's Table of Frequency Allocations, but many individual administrations have commonly adopted this allocation under "Article 4.4".			
[t4]	This includes a currently active footnote allocation mentioned in the ITU's Table of Frequency Allocations. These allocations may only apply to a group of countries.			
See also: Radio spectrum, Electromagnetic spectrum
