= 9-centimeter band =

Amateur radio frequency band

The 9-centimeter band is a portion of the SHF (microwave) radio spectrum internationally allocated to amateur radio and amateur satellite use. The amateur radio band, in ITU regions 1 and 2, is between 3.300 GHz and 3.500 GHz, and it is available only on a secondary basis. The amateur satellite band is between 3.400 GHz and 3.410 GHz, and it is only available in ITU Regions 1 and 2, on a non-interference basis to other users (ITU footnote 5.282). In Germany and Israel, the band 3.400–3.475 GHz is also allocated to the amateur service on a secondary basis (ITU footnote 5.431).

In CEPT's "European Common Allocation Table", footnote EU17 allocates 3.40 GHz to 3.41 GHz to European amateurs on a secondary basis.

In the US, the FCC is recommending removing the amateur service from this band in order to make room for the 5G cellular system. There have been many objections to this proposal by Amateur Radio operators, including the ARRL. Under an October 2020 decision, it remains available on a secondary basis to those who have acquired the license before October 2020.

== List of notable frequencies ==
ITU regions. Region 1 Region 2 Region 3

- 3.4001 GHz: IARU Region-1 calling frequency and Global EME center of activity
- 3.4561 GHz: IARU Region 2 calling frequency

=== Radio Astronomy ===
3.332–3.339 GHz and 3.3458–3.3525 GHz are used by radio astronomers for spectral line observations. Amateur stations voluntarily avoid using these frequencies when in geographic proximity to a radio telescope. ITU footnote 5.149 encourages all radio communications in the band to take practical steps to avoid harmful interference to radio astronomy observations in those frequency ranges.

== Countries with more restricted allocation ==
=== Australia ===
The ACMA allocates 3.300 to 3.400 GHz for Amateur Radio use for Advanced certificate holders, with a maximum power of 120W Px, or 400W Py. (Operation from 3.400 to 3.600 GHz is only allowed in remote areas of Australia). See Table C in the Radiocommunications (Amateur Stations) Class Licence 2023.

=== Sweden ===
The Swedish Post and Telecom Authority (PTS) does not consider 3.4 GHz to be an amateur band, and has therefore auctioned it off for 5G test use. Temporary permits in the 3.400–3.401 GHz range are currently issued however.

=== Spain ===
The Ministerio de Asuntos Económicos y Transformación Digital does not allow 3.4 GHz to be used by amateurs. Currently this band is used by 5G services.

== See also ==
- Amateur radio frequency allocations

Range	Band	ITU Region 1	ITU Region 2	ITU Region 3
LF	2200 m	135.7–137.8 kHz		
MF	630 m	472–479 kHz		
MF	160 m	1.810–1.850 MHz	1.800–2.000 MHz	
HF	80 / 75 m	3.500–3.800 MHz	3.500–4.000 MHz	3.500–3.900 MHz
HF	60 m	5.3515–5.3665 MHz		
HF	40 m	7.000–7.200 MHz	7.000–7.300 MHz	7.000–7.200 MHz
HF	30 m^{[t2]}	10.100–10.150 MHz		
HF	20 m	14.000–14.350 MHz		
HF	17 m^{[t2]}	18.068–18.168 MHz		
HF	15 m	21.000–21.450 MHz		
HF	12 m^{[t2]}	24.890–24.990 MHz		
HF	10 m	28.000–29.700 MHz		
VHF	8 m^{[t3]}	40.000–40.700 MHz	—N/a	
VHF	6 m	50.000–52.000 MHz (50.000–54.000 MHz)^{[t4]}	50.000–54.000 MHz	
VHF	5 m^{[t3]}	58.000–60.100 MHz	—N/a	
VHF	4 m^{[t3]}	70.000–70.500 MHz	—N/a	
VHF	2 m	144.000–146.000 MHz	144.000–148.000 MHz	
VHF	1.25 m	—N/a	220.000–225.000 MHz	—N/a
UHF	70 cm	430.000–440.000 MHz	430.000–440.000 MHz (420.000–450.000 MHz)^{[t4]}	
UHF	33 cm	—N/a	902.000–928.000 MHz	—N/a
UHF	23 cm	1.240–1.300 GHz		
UHF	13 cm	2.300–2.450 GHz		
SHF	9 cm	3.400–3.475 GHz^{[t4]}	3.300–3.500 GHz	
SHF	5 cm	5.650–5.850 GHz	5.650–5.925 GHz	5.650–5.850 GHz
SHF	3 cm	10.000–10.500 GHz		
SHF	1.2 cm	24.000–24.250 GHz		
EHF	6 mm	47.000–47.200 GHz		
EHF	4 mm^{[t4]}	75.500 GHz^{[t3]} – 81.500 GHz	76.000–81.500 GHz	
EHF	2.5 mm	122.250–123.000 GHz		
EHF	2 mm	134.000–141.000 GHz		
EHF	1 mm	241.000–250.000 GHz		
THF	Sub-mm	Some administrations have authorized spectrum for amateur use in this region; others have declined to regulate frequencies above 300 GHz.		
[t1]	All allocations are subject to variation by country. For simplicity, only common allocations found internationally are listed. See a band's article for specifics.			
[t2]	HF allocation created at the 1979 World Administrative Radio Conference. These are commonly called the "WARC bands".			
[t3]	This is not mentioned in the ITU's Table of Frequency Allocations, but many individual administrations have commonly adopted this allocation under "Article 4.4".			
[t4]	This includes a currently active footnote allocation mentioned in the ITU's Table of Frequency Allocations. These allocations may only apply to a group of countries.			
See also: Radio spectrum, Electromagnetic spectrum
