= 2.5-millimeter band =

Amateur radio frequency band

The 2.5-millimeter or 122 GHz band is a portion of the EHF (microwave) radio spectrum internationally allocated to amateur radio use between 122.250 GHz and 123.000 GHz.

The band is close to a molecular resonance of oxygen at 120 GHz, which causes significant atmospheric propagation losses, similar to that found at 60 GHz.

Due to the lack of commercial off the shelf radios, amateurs who operate on the 2.5 mm band must design and construct their own equipment, and those who do, often attempt to set communication distance records for the band.

== Allocation ==
The International Telecommunication Union allocates 122.250 GHz and 123.000 GHz to amateur radio on a secondary basis. As secondary users, amateurs must protect the fixed, mobile and inter-satellite services from harmful interference, which share the band with amateurs. In addition, 122 GHz to 123 GHz is an ISM band, and all users must accept interference caused by ISM devices. Amateur satellite operations are not permitted, and the ITU's allocations are the same in all three ITU Regions.

== List of notable frequencies ==
- 122.250 to 122.251 GHz Narrow band modes
- 122.5 GHz ISM band center frequency

== Distance records ==
The current world distance record on the 2.5 mm band is 139 kilometres (86 mi) set by stations K6ML, KB6BA and N9JIM on February 17, 2020.

The previous world distance record on the 2.5 mm band was 132 kilometres (82 mi) set by Austrian stations OE5VRL and OE3WOG on October 19, 2013.

The previous United States distance record was 114 kilometres (71 mi) set by stations WA1ZMS and W4WWQ on January 18, 2005.

The longest distance achieved on 2.5 mm in the United Kingdom was 51.9 kilometres (32.2 mi) between stations G8CUB and G0FDZ in January 2023.

In Australia, the 2.5 mm distance record was 69.6 kilometres (43.2 mi) set by stations VK4FB and VK4CSD on July 18, 2019.

== See also ==
- Amateur radio frequency allocations

Range	Band	ITU Region 1	ITU Region 2	ITU Region 3
LF	2200 m	135.7–137.8 kHz		
MF	630 m	472–479 kHz		
MF	160 m	1.810–1.850 MHz	1.800–2.000 MHz	
HF	80 / 75 m	3.500–3.800 MHz	3.500–4.000 MHz	3.500–3.900 MHz
HF	60 m	5.3515–5.3665 MHz		
HF	40 m	7.000–7.200 MHz	7.000–7.300 MHz	7.000–7.200 MHz
HF	30 m^{[t2]}	10.100–10.150 MHz		
HF	20 m	14.000–14.350 MHz		
HF	17 m^{[t2]}	18.068–18.168 MHz		
HF	15 m	21.000–21.450 MHz		
HF	12 m^{[t2]}	24.890–24.990 MHz		
HF	10 m	28.000–29.700 MHz		
VHF	8 m^{[t3]}	40.000–40.700 MHz	—N/a	
VHF	6 m	50.000–52.000 MHz (50.000–54.000 MHz)^{[t4]}	50.000–54.000 MHz	
VHF	5 m^{[t3]}	58.000–60.100 MHz	—N/a	
VHF	4 m^{[t3]}	70.000–70.500 MHz	—N/a	
VHF	2 m	144.000–146.000 MHz	144.000–148.000 MHz	
VHF	1.25 m	—N/a	220.000–225.000 MHz	—N/a
UHF	70 cm	430.000–440.000 MHz	430.000–440.000 MHz (420.000–450.000 MHz)^{[t4]}	
UHF	33 cm	—N/a	902.000–928.000 MHz	—N/a
UHF	23 cm	1.240–1.300 GHz		
UHF	13 cm	2.300–2.450 GHz		
SHF	9 cm	3.400–3.475 GHz^{[t4]}	3.300–3.500 GHz	
SHF	5 cm	5.650–5.850 GHz	5.650–5.925 GHz	5.650–5.850 GHz
SHF	3 cm	10.000–10.500 GHz		
SHF	1.2 cm	24.000–24.250 GHz		
EHF	6 mm	47.000–47.200 GHz		
EHF	4 mm^{[t4]}	75.500 GHz^{[t3]} – 81.500 GHz	76.000–81.500 GHz	
EHF	2.5 mm	122.250–123.000 GHz		
EHF	2 mm	134.000–141.000 GHz		
EHF	1 mm	241.000–250.000 GHz		
THF	Sub-mm	Some administrations have authorized spectrum for amateur use in this region; others have declined to regulate frequencies above 300 GHz.		
[t1]	All allocations are subject to variation by country. For simplicity, only common allocations found internationally are listed. See a band's article for specifics.			
[t2]	HF allocation created at the 1979 World Administrative Radio Conference. These are commonly called the "WARC bands".			
[t3]	This is not mentioned in the ITU's Table of Frequency Allocations, but many individual administrations have commonly adopted this allocation under "Article 4.4".			
[t4]	This includes a currently active footnote allocation mentioned in the ITU's Table of Frequency Allocations. These allocations may only apply to a group of countries.			
See also: Radio spectrum, Electromagnetic spectrum
