= 23-centimeter band =

Amateur radio frequency band

The 23 centimeter, 1200 MHz or 1.2 GHz band is a portion of the UHF (microwave) radio spectrum internationally allocated to amateur radio and amateur satellite use on a secondary basis. The amateur radio band is between 1240 MHz and 1300 MHz. The amateur satellite band is between 1260 MHz and 1270 MHz, and its use by satellite operations is only for up-links on a non-interference basis to other radio users (ITU footnote 5.282). The allocations are the same in all three ITU regions.

- In the United Kingdom the band is between 1240 MHz and 1325 MHz.
- In Ireland the band is between 1240 MHz and 1304 MHz.

Most modes of communication used in amateur radio can be found in the 23 cm band. Some of the more common modes include voice, data, EME (moonbounce), as well as ATV.

== History ==
The 23cm band was born after World War II, at the International Radio Conference celebrated in Atlantic City, New Jersey in 1947. The band was defined from 1215 to 1300 MHz and was allocated exclusively for radio amateur use.

In the 1979 World Administrative Radio Conference held in Geneva (WARC-79), the band was reduced to 1240 - 1300 MHz and downgraded to secondary allocation for amateur use. The primary allocation to the radiolocation service has highest priority.

Agenda Item AI-9.1b at the 2023 World Radio Conference (WRC-23) considered further constraints on 23cm to protect the Radio Navigation Satellite Service (RNSS), which is also a primary user of the band. RNSS systems include Glonass, Compass and Galileo which use this frequency range to supplement their more standard GNSS frequencies.

In November 2023 ITU-R Recommendation M.2164 was published, giving guidance for amateur and amateur satellite usage.

== List of notable frequencies ==
ITU regions. Region 1 Region 2 Region 3

Frequencies in the 23 cm band are harmonized by International Telecommunication Union region.

=== Region 1 ===
- CW and SSB calling frequency is 1296.2 MHz.
- FM simplex calling frequency is 1297.5 MHz.

=== Region 2 ===
- CW and SSB calling frequency is 1296.1 MHz.
- FM simplex calling frequency is 1294.5 MHz.

=== Region 3 ===
- FM Simplex Calling Frequency is 1294.0 MHz (VK Australian band-plan 2007)

In 2008 the IARU Region-1 Cavtat Conference designated 1240.000-1240.750 MHz as an alternative centre for narrowband activity and beacons. This is a mitigation for sharing with existing aviation radars and Primary users, or for potential issues with the European Galileo system.

== See also ==
- Amateur radio frequency allocations

Range	Band	ITU Region 1	ITU Region 2	ITU Region 3
LF	2200 m	135.7–137.8 kHz		
MF	630 m	472–479 kHz		
MF	160 m	1.810–1.850 MHz	1.800–2.000 MHz	
HF	80 / 75 m	3.500–3.800 MHz	3.500–4.000 MHz	3.500–3.900 MHz
HF	60 m	5.3515–5.3665 MHz		
HF	40 m	7.000–7.200 MHz	7.000–7.300 MHz	7.000–7.200 MHz
HF	30 m^{[t2]}	10.100–10.150 MHz		
HF	20 m	14.000–14.350 MHz		
HF	17 m^{[t2]}	18.068–18.168 MHz		
HF	15 m	21.000–21.450 MHz		
HF	12 m^{[t2]}	24.890–24.990 MHz		
HF	10 m	28.000–29.700 MHz		
VHF	8 m^{[t3]}	40.000–40.700 MHz	—N/a	
VHF	6 m	50.000–52.000 MHz (50.000–54.000 MHz)^{[t4]}	50.000–54.000 MHz	
VHF	5 m^{[t3]}	58.000–60.100 MHz	—N/a	
VHF	4 m^{[t3]}	70.000–70.500 MHz	—N/a	
VHF	2 m	144.000–146.000 MHz	144.000–148.000 MHz	
VHF	1.25 m	—N/a	220.000–225.000 MHz	—N/a
UHF	70 cm	430.000–440.000 MHz	430.000–440.000 MHz (420.000–450.000 MHz)^{[t4]}	
UHF	33 cm	—N/a	902.000–928.000 MHz	—N/a
UHF	23 cm	1.240–1.300 GHz		
UHF	13 cm	2.300–2.450 GHz		
SHF	9 cm	3.400–3.475 GHz^{[t4]}	3.300–3.500 GHz	
SHF	5 cm	5.650–5.850 GHz	5.650–5.925 GHz	5.650–5.850 GHz
SHF	3 cm	10.000–10.500 GHz		
SHF	1.2 cm	24.000–24.250 GHz		
EHF	6 mm	47.000–47.200 GHz		
EHF	4 mm^{[t4]}	75.500 GHz^{[t3]} – 81.500 GHz	76.000–81.500 GHz	
EHF	2.5 mm	122.250–123.000 GHz		
EHF	2 mm	134.000–141.000 GHz		
EHF	1 mm	241.000–250.000 GHz		
THF	Sub-mm	Some administrations have authorized spectrum for amateur use in this region; others have declined to regulate frequencies above 300 GHz.		
[t1]	All allocations are subject to variation by country. For simplicity, only common allocations found internationally are listed. See a band's article for specifics.			
[t2]	HF allocation created at the 1979 World Administrative Radio Conference. These are commonly called the "WARC bands".			
[t3]	This is not mentioned in the ITU's Table of Frequency Allocations, but many individual administrations have commonly adopted this allocation under "Article 4.4".			
[t4]	This includes a currently active footnote allocation mentioned in the ITU's Table of Frequency Allocations. These allocations may only apply to a group of countries.			
See also: Radio spectrum, Electromagnetic spectrum
