= 3-centimeter band =

Amateur radio frequency band

The 3-centimeter or 10 GHz band is a portion of the SHF (microwave) radio spectrum internationally allocated to amateur radio and amateur satellite use on a secondary basis. The amateur radio band is between 10.00 GHz and 10.50 GHz, and the amateur satellite band is between 10.45 GHz and 10.50 GHz. The allocations are the same in all three ITU regions.

== List of notable frequencies ==
ITU regions. Region 1 Region 2 Region 3

- 10.3681 GHz Region 2 narrow band calling frequency
- 10.3682 GHz Region 1 narrow band calling frequency
- 10.3683 to 10.3684 GHz Region 2 propagation beacons
- 10.36875 to 10.36899 GHz Region 1 propagation beacons

=== Wideband FM Channels ===
Common Wideband FM frequencies used with gunnplexers.
Operation is in full-duplex with a 30 or 90 MHz split:

- 10.220 GHz
- 10.250 GHz †
- 10.280 GHz †
- 10.310 GHz
- 10.340 GHz
- 10.370 GHz ‡
- 10.400 GHz
- 10.430 GHz

† Most commonly used frequency pair for gunnplexers in North America. (10.200 to 10.300 GHz is reserved for gunnplexers in the ARRL Band Plan.)

‡ Should only be used if interference is not caused to narrow-band stations.

== See also ==
- Amateur radio frequency allocations

Range	Band	ITU Region 1	ITU Region 2	ITU Region 3
LF	2200 m	135.7–137.8 kHz		
MF	630 m	472–479 kHz		
MF	160 m	1.810–1.850 MHz	1.800–2.000 MHz	
HF	80 / 75 m	3.500–3.800 MHz	3.500–4.000 MHz	3.500–3.900 MHz
HF	60 m	5.3515–5.3665 MHz		
HF	40 m	7.000–7.200 MHz	7.000–7.300 MHz	7.000–7.200 MHz
HF	30 m^{[t2]}	10.100–10.150 MHz		
HF	20 m	14.000–14.350 MHz		
HF	17 m^{[t2]}	18.068–18.168 MHz		
HF	15 m	21.000–21.450 MHz		
HF	12 m^{[t2]}	24.890–24.990 MHz		
HF	10 m	28.000–29.700 MHz		
VHF	8 m^{[t3]}	40.000–40.700 MHz	—	
VHF	6 m	50.000–52.000 MHz (50.000–54.000 MHz)^{[t4]}	50.000–54.000 MHz	
VHF	5 m^{[t3]}	58.000–60.100 MHz	—	
VHF	4 m^{[t3]}	70.000–70.500 MHz	—	
VHF	2 m	144.000–146.000 MHz	144.000–148.000 MHz	
VHF	1.25 m	—	220.000–225.000 MHz	—
UHF	70 cm	430.000–440.000 MHz	430.000–440.000 MHz (420.000–450.000 MHz)^{[t4]}	
UHF	33 cm	—	902.000–928.000 MHz	—
UHF	23 cm	1.240–1.300 GHz		
UHF	13 cm	2.300–2.450 GHz		
SHF	9 cm	3.400–3.475 GHz^{[t4]}	3.300–3.500 GHz	
SHF	5 cm	5.650–5.850 GHz	5.650–5.925 GHz	5.650–5.850 GHz
SHF	3 cm	10.000–10.500 GHz		
SHF	1.2 cm	24.000–24.250 GHz		
EHF	6 mm	47.000–47.200 GHz		
EHF	4 mm^{[t4]}	75.500 GHz^{[t3]} – 81.500 GHz	76.000–81.500 GHz	
EHF	2.5 mm	122.250–123.000 GHz		
EHF	2 mm	134.000–141.000 GHz		
EHF	1 mm	241.000–250.000 GHz		
THF	Sub-mm	Some administrations have authorized spectrum for amateur use in this region; others have declined to regulate frequencies above 300 GHz.		
[t1]	All allocations are subject to variation by country. For simplicity, only common allocations found internationally are listed. See a band's article for specifics.			
[t2]	HF allocation created at the 1979 World Administrative Radio Conference. These are commonly called the "WARC bands".			
[t3]	This is not mentioned in the ITU's Table of Frequency Allocations, but many individual administrations have commonly adopted this allocation under "Article 4.4".			
[t4]	This includes a currently active footnote allocation mentioned in the ITU's Table of Frequency Allocations. These allocations may only apply to a group of countries.			
See also: Radio spectrum, Electromagnetic spectrum
