= 1.2-centimeter band =

Amateur radio frequency band

The 1.2-centimeter or 24 GHz band is a portion of the SHF (microwave) radio spectrum internationally allocated to amateur radio and amateur satellite use. The amateur radio band is between 24.00 GHz and 24.25 GHz, and the amateur satellite band is between 24.00 GHz and 24.05 GHz. Amateurs operate on a primary basis between 24.00 GHz and 24.05 GHz and on a secondary basis in the rest of the band. Amateur stations must accept harmful interference from ISM users. The allocations are the same in all three ITU regions.

== List of notable frequencies ==
- 24.0482 GHz Narrow band calling frequency
- 24.0488 to 24.048995 GHz Radio propagation beacons
- 24.1921 GHz USA narrow band calling frequency

=== Wideband FM Channels ===
Common Wideband FM frequencies used with gunnplexers. Operation is in full-duplex with a 30 MHz split:

- 24.125 GHz †
- 24.155 GHz

† Also the center frequency for ISM devices operating in the band.

== See also ==
- Amateur radio frequency allocations

| Range | Band | ITU Region 1 | ITU Region 2 | ITU Region 3 |
|---|---|---|---|---|
| LF | 2200 m | 135.7–137.8 kHz | | |
| MF | 630 m | 472–479 kHz | | |
| MF | 160 m | 1.810–1.850 MHz | 1.800–2.000 MHz | |
| HF | 80 / 75 m | 3.500–3.800 MHz | 3.500–4.000 MHz | 3.500–3.900 MHz |
| HF | 60 m | 5.3515–5.3665 MHz | | |
| HF | 40 m | 7.000–7.200 MHz | 7.000–7.300 MHz | 7.000–7.200 MHz |
| HF | 30 m^{[t2]} | 10.100–10.150 MHz | | |
| HF | 20 m | 14.000–14.350 MHz | | |
| HF | 17 m^{[t2]} | 18.068–18.168 MHz | | |
| HF | 15 m | 21.000–21.450 MHz | | |
| HF | 12 m^{[t2]} | 24.890–24.990 MHz | | |
| HF | 10 m | 28.000–29.700 MHz | | |
| VHF | 8 m^{[t3]} | 40.000–40.700 MHz | —N/a | |
| VHF | 6 m | 50.000–52.000 MHz (50.000–54.000 MHz)^{[t4]} | 50.000–54.000 MHz | |
| VHF | 5 m^{[t3]} | 58.000–60.100 MHz | —N/a | |
| VHF | 4 m^{[t3]} | 70.000–70.500 MHz | —N/a | |
| VHF | 2 m | 144.000–146.000 MHz | 144.000–148.000 MHz | |
| VHF | 1.25 m | —N/a | 220.000–225.000 MHz | —N/a |
| UHF | 70 cm | 430.000–440.000 MHz | 430.000–440.000 MHz (420.000–450.000 MHz)^{[t4]} | |
| UHF | 33 cm | —N/a | 902.000–928.000 MHz | —N/a |
| UHF | 23 cm | 1.240–1.300 GHz | | |
| UHF | 13 cm | 2.300–2.450 GHz | | |
| SHF | 9 cm | 3.400–3.475 GHz^{[t4]} | 3.300–3.500 GHz | |
| SHF | 5 cm | 5.650–5.850 GHz | 5.650–5.925 GHz | 5.650–5.850 GHz |
| SHF | 3 cm | 10.000–10.500 GHz | | |
| SHF | 1.2 cm | 24.000–24.250 GHz | | |
| EHF | 6 mm | 47.000–47.200 GHz | | |
| EHF | 4 mm^{[t4]} | 75.500 GHz^{[t3]} – 81.500 GHz | 76.000–81.500 GHz | |
| EHF | 2.5 mm | 122.250–123.000 GHz | | |
| EHF | 2 mm | 134.000–141.000 GHz | | |
| EHF | 1 mm | 241.000–250.000 GHz | | |
| THF | Sub-mm | Some administrations have authorized spectrum for amateur use in this region; others have declined to regulate frequencies above 300 GHz. | | |
| [t1] | All allocations are subject to variation by country. For simplicity, only common allocations found internationally are listed. See a band's article for specifics. | | | |
| [t2] | HF allocation created at the 1979 World Administrative Radio Conference. These are commonly called the "WARC bands". | | | |
| [t3] | This is not mentioned in the ITU's Table of Frequency Allocations, but many individual administrations have commonly adopted this allocation under "Article 4.4". | | | |
| [t4] | This includes a currently active footnote allocation mentioned in the ITU's Table of Frequency Allocations. These allocations may only apply to a group of countries. | | | |
See also: Radio spectrum, Electromagnetic spectrum
