= 13-centimeter band =

Amateur radio frequency band

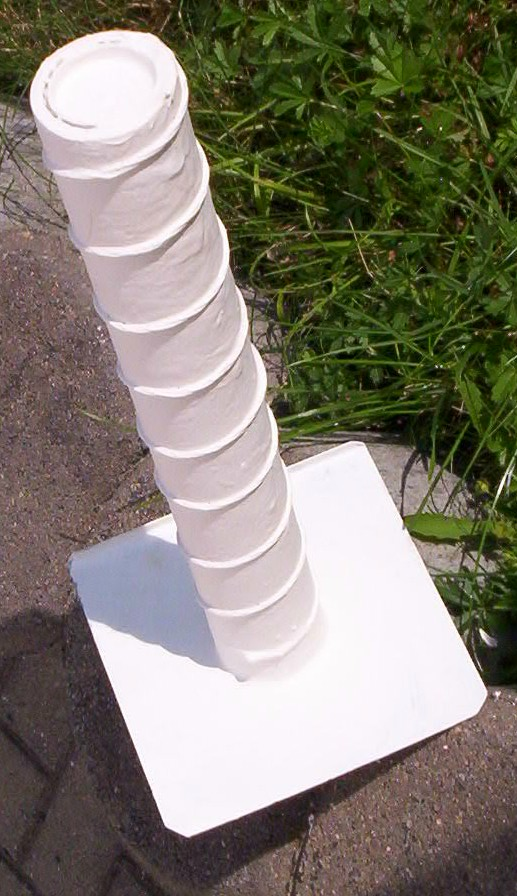
Helical antenna for the 13-cm band

The 13 centimeter, 2.3 GHz or 2.4 GHz band is a portion of the UHF (microwave) radio spectrum internationally allocated to amateur radio and amateur satellite use on a secondary basis. The amateur radio band is between 2300 MHz and 2450 MHz, and thereby inside the S-band. The amateur satellite band is between 2400 MHz and 2450 MHz, and its use by satellite operations is on a non-interference basis to other radio users (ITU footnote 5.282). The license privileges of amateur radio operators include the use of frequencies and a wide variety of modes within these ranges for telecommunication. The allocations are the same in all three ITU Regions.

The band is also allocated to the Mobile service in the 2300–2400 MHz range on a Primary basis, which in practice creates some difficult sharing scenarios and erratic amateur allocations at the national level.

Above 2400 MHz the band overlaps with the 2.4 GHz ISM (industrial, scientific, and medical) band, and amateur stations must accept harmful interference caused by ISM equipment operating in the band, such as microwave ovens. The ISM band is also used by unlicensed devices, such as Wi-Fi and Bluetooth, which must not cause interference to amateur stations.

== History ==
The first Earth-Venus-Earth contact by amateur radio operators was established on the 13 cm band in 2009. In HAMNET, the 13 cm band is primarily used for user access.

== Frequencies allocations ==
ITU regions. Region 1 Region 2 Region 3

- 2,304.1 MHz Region 2 CW & SSB calling frequency
- 2,320.2 MHz Region 1 Narrow-band calling frequency
- 2,450 MHz Operating frequency of ISM devices.

Generally, amateur radio is permitted worldwide in the frequency range of 2300 MHz to 2450 MHz. However, in Germany, only the frequency range above 2320 MHz is allocated to amateur radio. In the United States, the 13 cm band comprises frequencies in two segments stretching from 2.300 to 2.310 GHz, and from 2.390 to 2.450 GHz. (The segment from 2.310 to 2.390 GHz was withdrawn from the amateur service and reallocated to direct satellite radio broadcasting, e.g., Sirius XM Radio.) The segment, 2.390 to 2.417 GHz, is domestically allocated amateur radio on a primary basis, while the remainder of the band is only available on a secondary basis. It is authorized to all amateur radio licensees who hold a Technician or higher class license (US), or a Basic or higher license (Canada). The band is allocated on a shared basis with other services, and U.S. Federal Communications Commission (FCC) Rules specify that amateurs may not cause interference to and must accept interference from other services authorized by other nations, and by radio-location, fixed, and mobile stations (except aeronautical) authorized by the FCC. As in the rest of the world, US stations in the amateur service are not protected from interference caused by industrial, scientific, and medical equipment.

The bandplan published by the American Radio Relay League recommends frequencies based on intended activity in the band.

The following table shows the amateur radio bandplan for the 13-cm band:

Frequence range	Use
2320,000–2320,025 MHz	CW, EME
2320,025–2320,150 MHz	CW, Aktivitätszentrum PSK31 2320,138 MHz
2320,150–2320,800 MHz	CW & SSB, Aktivitätszentrum SSB 2320,200 MHz
2320,800–2320,990 MHz	internationales Baken-Projekt
2321,000–2322,000 MHz	Schmalband, Simplex & Relaiseingabe (NBFM)
2322,000–2355,000 MHz	ATV, RX (16 MHz)
2355,000–2365,000 MHz	digitale Kommunikation
2355,000–2365,000 MHz	Duplex, digital (+35 MHz Shift)
2365,000–2370,000 MHz	Schmalband, Relaisausgabe (NBFM)
2370,000–2392,000 MHz	ATV, TX (16 MHz)
2392,000–2400,000 MHz	Duplex, digital (−35 MHz Shift)
2400,000–2450,000 MHz	Amateurfunksatelliten

== See also ==
- Amateur radio frequency allocations
- High-speed multimedia radio

Range	Band	ITU Region 1	ITU Region 2	ITU Region 3
LF	2200 m	135.7–137.8 kHz		
MF	630 m	472–479 kHz		
MF	160 m	1.810–1.850 MHz	1.800–2.000 MHz	
HF	80 / 75 m	3.500–3.800 MHz	3.500–4.000 MHz	3.500–3.900 MHz
HF	60 m	5.3515–5.3665 MHz		
HF	40 m	7.000–7.200 MHz	7.000–7.300 MHz	7.000–7.200 MHz
HF	30 m^{[t2]}	10.100–10.150 MHz		
HF	20 m	14.000–14.350 MHz		
HF	17 m^{[t2]}	18.068–18.168 MHz		
HF	15 m	21.000–21.450 MHz		
HF	12 m^{[t2]}	24.890–24.990 MHz		
HF	10 m	28.000–29.700 MHz		
VHF	8 m^{[t3]}	40.000–40.700 MHz	—N/a	
VHF	6 m	50.000–52.000 MHz (50.000–54.000 MHz)^{[t4]}	50.000–54.000 MHz	
VHF	5 m^{[t3]}	58.000–60.100 MHz	—N/a	
VHF	4 m^{[t3]}	70.000–70.500 MHz	—N/a	
VHF	2 m	144.000–146.000 MHz	144.000–148.000 MHz	
VHF	1.25 m	—N/a	220.000–225.000 MHz	—N/a
UHF	70 cm	430.000–440.000 MHz	430.000–440.000 MHz (420.000–450.000 MHz)^{[t4]}	
UHF	33 cm	—N/a	902.000–928.000 MHz	—N/a
UHF	23 cm	1.240–1.300 GHz		
UHF	13 cm	2.300–2.450 GHz		
SHF	9 cm	3.400–3.475 GHz^{[t4]}	3.300–3.500 GHz	
SHF	5 cm	5.650–5.850 GHz	5.650–5.925 GHz	5.650–5.850 GHz
SHF	3 cm	10.000–10.500 GHz		
SHF	1.2 cm	24.000–24.250 GHz		
EHF	6 mm	47.000–47.200 GHz		
EHF	4 mm^{[t4]}	75.500 GHz^{[t3]} – 81.500 GHz	76.000–81.500 GHz	
EHF	2.5 mm	122.250–123.000 GHz		
EHF	2 mm	134.000–141.000 GHz		
EHF	1 mm	241.000–250.000 GHz		
THF	Sub-mm	Some administrations have authorized spectrum for amateur use in this region; others have declined to regulate frequencies above 300 GHz.		
[t1]	All allocations are subject to variation by country. For simplicity, only common allocations found internationally are listed. See a band's article for specifics.			
[t2]	HF allocation created at the 1979 World Administrative Radio Conference. These are commonly called the "WARC bands".			
[t3]	This is not mentioned in the ITU's Table of Frequency Allocations, but many individual administrations have commonly adopted this allocation under "Article 4.4".			
[t4]	This includes a currently active footnote allocation mentioned in the ITU's Table of Frequency Allocations. These allocations may only apply to a group of countries.			
See also: Radio spectrum, Electromagnetic spectrum
