= World Radiocommunication Conference =

Convention organised by the International Telecommunication Union

Plenary Meeting at World Radio Conference 2007 in Geneva

The World Radiocommunication Conference (WRC) is a conference organized by the ITU to review and, as necessary, revise the Radio Regulations, the international treaty governing the use of the radio-frequency spectrum as well as geostationary and non-geostationary satellite orbits. It is held every three to four years.

Prior to 1993, it was called the World Administrative Radio Conference (WARC); in 1992, at an Additional Plenipotentiary Conference in Geneva, the ITU was restructured, and later conferences became the WRC.

At the 2015 conference (WRC-15), the ITU deferred their decision on whether to abolish the leap second to 2023.

The most recent World Radio Communication Conference (WRC-23) took place from 20 November to 15 December 2023 in Dubai, UAE.

== Past Conferences ==
- World Radiocommunication Conference 1993 (Geneva, Switzerland, November 1993)
- World Radiocommunication Conference 1995 (Geneva, Switzerland, 23 October – 17 November 1995)
- World Radiocommunication Conference 1997 (Geneva, Switzerland, 27 October – 21 November 1997)
- World Radiocommunication Conference 2000 (Istanbul, Turkey 8 May – 2 June 2000)
- World Radiocommunication Conference 2003 (Geneva, Switzerland, 9 June – 4 July 2003)
- World Radiocommunication Conference 2007 (Geneva, Switzerland, 22 October – 16 November 2007)
- World Radiocommunication Conference 2012 (Geneva, Switzerland, 23 January – 17 February 2012)
- World Radiocommunication Conference 2015 (Geneva, Switzerland, 2–27 November 2015)
- World Radiocommunication Conference 2019 (Sharm el-Sheikh, Egypt, 28 October – 22 November 2019)
- World Radiocommunication Conference 2023 (Dubai, United Arab Emirates, 20 November – 15 December 2023)

== Future Conference ==
- World Radiocommunication Conference 2027 (WRC-27; Shanghai, China, 18 October – 12 November, 2027)
