= 20-meter band =

Amateur radio frequency band

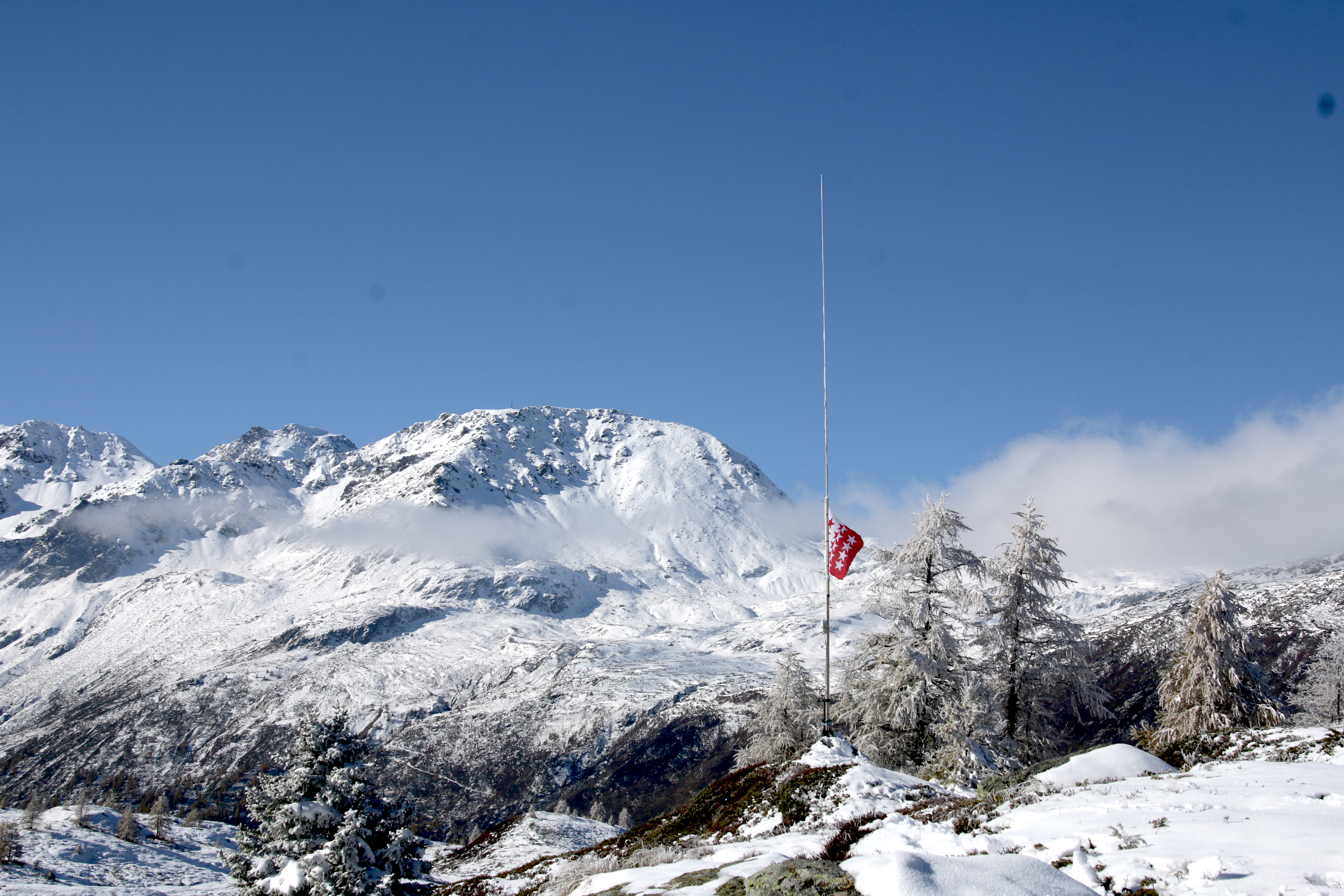
A HB9XBG-vertical-Antenna for the 20m-Band on Simplon Pass with view to Mount Galehorn.

The 20-meter or 14-MHz amateur radio band is a portion of the shortwave radio spectrum, comprising frequencies stretching from 14.000 MHz to 14.350 MHz. The 20-meter band is widely considered among the best for long-distance communication (DXing), and is one of the most popular—and crowded—during contests. Several factors contribute to this, including the band's large size, the relatively small size of antennas tuned to it (especially as compared to antennas for the 40-meter band or the 80-meter band) and its good potential for daytime international operation even in unfavorable propagation conditions.

== History ==
The Third National Radio Conference was responsible for opening up the 20-meter band to amateur radio operators in the US on October 10, 1924. The band was allocated on a worldwide basis by the International Radiotelegraph Conference in Washington, D.C., on October 4, 1927. Its frequency allocation was then 14–14.4 MHz. The allocation was reduced to 14–14.35 MHz by the International Radio Conference of Atlantic City, New Jersey 1947.

== Band plans ==
=== IARU Region 1 ===
Europe, Africa, Middle East and Northern Asia

20 meters	14000–14070	14070–14099	14099–14101	14101–14350
IARU Region 1				

=== IARU Region 2 ===
The Americas

20 meters	14000–14070	14070–14099	14099–14101	14101–14350
IARU Region 2				

=== IARU Region 3 ===
Asia-Pacific

20 meters	14000–14070	14070–14099	14099–14101	14101–14112	14112–14350
IARU Region 3					

=== United States ===
Effective 12:01 a.m. EST, February 23, 2007

20 meters	14000–14350				
United States	14000–14025	14025–14150	14150–14175	14175–14225	14225–14350
General					
Advanced					
Extra					

=== Canada ===
Canada is part of region 2 and as such is subject to the IARU band plan. Radio Amateurs of Canada offers the bandplan below as a recommendation for use by radio amateurs in that country but it does not have the force of law and should only be considered a suggestion or guideline.

License class	14.000–14.070	14.070–14.095	14.095–14.0995	14.0995–14.1005	14.1005–14.112	14.112–14.350
Basic(+), Advanced						

=== Japan ===
Changed on September 25, 2023.

License class	14000–14070	14070–14100	14100–14350
1st and 2nd			narrow-band All modes

Key

= CW only
= CW, narrow band digital (<= 500 Hz)
= CW, narrow band digital (<= 500 Hz), wide band digital
= CW, RTTY and data (US: < 1 kHz Bandwidth)
= Beacons
= CW, phone
= CW, narrow band digital (<= 500 Hz), phone
= CW, phone and image

Range	Band	ITU Region 1	ITU Region 2	ITU Region 3
LF	2200 m	135.7–137.8 kHz		
MF	630 m	472–479 kHz		
MF	160 m	1.810–1.850 MHz	1.800–2.000 MHz	
HF	80 / 75 m	3.500–3.800 MHz	3.500–4.000 MHz	3.500–3.900 MHz
HF	60 m	5.3515–5.3665 MHz		
HF	40 m	7.000–7.200 MHz	7.000–7.300 MHz	7.000–7.200 MHz
HF	30 m^{[t2]}	10.100–10.150 MHz		
HF	20 m	14.000–14.350 MHz		
HF	17 m^{[t2]}	18.068–18.168 MHz		
HF	15 m	21.000–21.450 MHz		
HF	12 m^{[t2]}	24.890–24.990 MHz		
HF	10 m	28.000–29.700 MHz		
VHF	8 m^{[t3]}	40.000–40.700 MHz	—N/a	
VHF	6 m	50.000–52.000 MHz (50.000–54.000 MHz)^{[t4]}	50.000–54.000 MHz	
VHF	5 m^{[t3]}	58.000–60.100 MHz	—N/a	
VHF	4 m^{[t3]}	70.000–70.500 MHz	—N/a	
VHF	2 m	144.000–146.000 MHz	144.000–148.000 MHz	
VHF	1.25 m	—N/a	220.000–225.000 MHz	—N/a
UHF	70 cm	430.000–440.000 MHz	430.000–440.000 MHz (420.000–450.000 MHz)^{[t4]}	
UHF	33 cm	—N/a	902.000–928.000 MHz	—N/a
UHF	23 cm	1.240–1.300 GHz		
UHF	13 cm	2.300–2.450 GHz		
SHF	9 cm	3.400–3.475 GHz^{[t4]}	3.300–3.500 GHz	
SHF	5 cm	5.650–5.850 GHz	5.650–5.925 GHz	5.650–5.850 GHz
SHF	3 cm	10.000–10.500 GHz		
SHF	1.2 cm	24.000–24.250 GHz		
EHF	6 mm	47.000–47.200 GHz		
EHF	4 mm^{[t4]}	75.500 GHz^{[t3]} – 81.500 GHz	76.000–81.500 GHz	
EHF	2.5 mm	122.250–123.000 GHz		
EHF	2 mm	134.000–141.000 GHz		
EHF	1 mm	241.000–250.000 GHz		
THF	Sub-mm	Some administrations have authorized spectrum for amateur use in this region; others have declined to regulate frequencies above 300 GHz.		
[t1]	All allocations are subject to variation by country. For simplicity, only common allocations found internationally are listed. See a band's article for specifics.			
[t2]	HF allocation created at the 1979 World Administrative Radio Conference. These are commonly called the "WARC bands".			
[t3]	This is not mentioned in the ITU's Table of Frequency Allocations, but many individual administrations have commonly adopted this allocation under "Article 4.4".			
[t4]	This includes a currently active footnote allocation mentioned in the ITU's Table of Frequency Allocations. These allocations may only apply to a group of countries.			
See also: Radio spectrum, Electromagnetic spectrum
