= Kerb (disambiguation) =

Kerb, kerbs or K.E.R.B. may refer to:

- Curb, or kerb, the raised edge of a road
- Auto racing kerbs, kerbstones lining the corners of racing tracks
- Kerb (archaeology), a type of stone ring
- KERB (AM), a defunct radio station (600 AM) formerly licensed to serve Kermit, Texas, United States
- KERB-FM, a defunct radio station (106.3 FM) formerly licensed to serve Kermit, Texas, United States
- KERB-LP, a radio station (99.9 FM) licensed to serve Grand Prairie, Texas, United States

== See also ==
- Curb (disambiguation)
- Kerber
