= KERB (AM) =

Radio station in Kermit, Texas (1950–2013)

Kermit, Texas; United States
- Broadcast area: Odessa, Texas
- Frequency: 600 kHz

Programming
- Language: Spanish
- Format: Defunct (Religious)

Ownership
- Owner: La Radio Cristiana Network, Inc.
- Sister stations: KAYG, KDFM, KERB-FM, KIBL, KLDS

History
- First air date: June 1950
- Last air date: November 7, 2013

Technical information
- Facility ID: 57519
- Class: D
- Power: 1,000 watts (day); 91 watts (night)
- Transmitter coordinates: 31°50′05″N 103°08′10″W

KERB (600 AM) was an American radio station licensed to serve the community of Kermit, Texas. Launched in June 1950, the station employed many West Texas musical figures before they were famous, including future Rock and Roll Hall of Fame inductee Roy Orbison. The station's broadcast license was last held by La Radio Cristiana Network, Inc. Owner Paulino Bernal surrendered the license for KERB and five other stations to the Federal Communications Commission on Nov. 7, 2013.

== Programming ==
KERB, like most rural American radio stations in the 1950s, had launched with an eclectic mix of music styles but became a solid country & western outlet through the 1960s, 1970s, and 1980s. Most recently, KERB broadcast a Spanish-language religious radio format to the greater Odessa, Texas, area. The station shared some programming with former sister stations KAYG, KDFM, KIBL, KLDS, and KERB-FM as part of the La Radio Cristiana Network.

== History ==
=== Early days ===
In 1949, the Federal Communications Commission (FCC) issued a construction permit to the Kermit Broadcasting Company for a new AM radio station to broadcast with 1,000 watts of power, daytime only, on a frequency of 600 kilohertz. The station was assigned the call sign "KERB" by the FCC. The station signed on in June 1950 with George H. Cook as company president, Victor King as general manager, James Boultinghouse as program director, and James Radcliffe as chief engineer.

A new company called Radio Station KERB, Inc., purchased the radio station on November 23, 1955. H.V. Brinson served as both company president and the station's general manager until he sold the station. KERB Broadcasting, Inc., acquired the radio station on October 1, 1968. Floyd Shelton was company president and Ken Welch was general manager under the new ownership. In the 1970s, Jean Welch became the station's office manager and program director while Doug Welch served as chief engineer. In 1979, the Welch family purchased KERB Broadcasting, Inc., and Ken Welch added company president to his duties.

=== 1980s and 1990s ===
To expand to 24-hour operation, KERB was joined in 1987 by a new FM sister station, licensed as "KERB-FM", not bound by the AM station's "daytimer" restriction. (A "daytimer" is licensed to operate only from local sunrise to local sunset to protect other radio stations from skywave interference.)

In March 1988, owners M.F. and Jean Welch agreed to transfer control of KERB Broadcasting, Inc., to Marlin D. Kuykendall. The FCC approved the transfer on April 12, 1988, and the move was consummated on May 1, 1988. Less than two years later, the station faced financial difficulties and in January 1991 the KERB and KERB-FM broadcast licenses were involuntarily transferred from KERB Broadcasting, Inc., to Ron White acting as receiver. The FCC approved the move on February 15, 1991.

In June 1991, the station applied for special temporary authority to remain dark while a new operator for KERB could be found. The FCC granted this authority on November 4, 1991, with a scheduled expiration date of March 4, 1992. In September 1991, receiver Ron White found a buyer for both stations and applied to transfer the broadcast licenses to Mesa Entertainment, Inc., which owned KOZA(AM), in Odessa, Texas. The FCC approved the deal on November 4, 1991, and after extended complications the transaction was consummated on March 15, 1996.

In March 1997, Mesa Entertainment, Inc., made a deal to sell KERB and KERB-FM to La Radio Cristiana Network, Inc. The FCC approved the sale on May 20, 1997, and formal consummation of the transaction occurred on September 15, 1997.

== Station alumni ==
- Rockabilly pioneer Charline Arthur worked as a singer and a disc jockey at KERB from 1950 until 1953 when she was "discovered" by Colonel Tom Parker. Parker signed her to a recording contract with RCA Records. She would later star on the Big D Jamboree, perform throughout the 1950s and 1960s, and be inducted into the Rockabilly Hall of Fame.
- American singer-songwriter Roy Orbison began performing on KERB in 1951. He formed a band, The Wink Westerners, with several friends from high school. In 1953, the band began their own weekly radio show on KERB. Orbison would later be signed to Sun Records, become a music legend whose career spanned four decades, and be inducted into the Rock and Roll Hall of Fame in 1987.
