= KDFM =

- Falfurrias, Texas; United States
- Broadcast area: Kingsville-Alice-Falfurrias
- Frequency: 103.3 MHz

Programming
- Format: Spanish Christian radio

Ownership
- Owner: Cantico Nuevo Ministry Inc
- Sister stations: KERB, KIBL, KLDS

History
- First air date: 1989

Technical information
- Licensing authority: FCC
- Facility ID: 86553
- Class: A
- ERP: 3,000 watts
- HAAT: 100 meters (330 ft)
- Transmitter coordinates: 27°15′29″N 98°7′8″W

Links
- Public license information: Public file; LMS
- Website: RadioCanticoNuevo.com

KDFM (103.3 MHz) is an FM radio station broadcasting a Spanish Christian radio format. Licensed to Falfurrias, Texas, the station serves part of South Texas, south of Corpus Christi. KDFM is owned by Cantico Nuevo Ministry Inc.
