= Curb (disambiguation) =

Curb or kerb, the raised edge of a raised footpath or roadway.

Curb or the Curb may also refer to:

== Equestrian ==
- Curb (horse), an injury to the long plantar ligament in horses
- Curb bit, a type of bit used for riding horses
  - Curb chain, a piece of horse tack used with a curb bit

== Music ==
- Curb (album), Nickelback's first full-length album
- Mike Curb (born 1944), American musician
  - Curb Records, a record label started by Mike Curb in 1973

== Other uses ==
- The Curb, a nickname for the American Stock Exchange, from its original name The New York Curb Exchange
- The Curb (website), an Australian film website
- Curb Event Center, a multipurpose arena on the campus of Belmont University
- Curb Racing, a former NASCAR team
- Curbing, a form of assault
- Curb your dog, a NYC sign encouraging dog defecation in the curb rather than on the sidewalk
- Trading curb, a financial regulatory instrument for preventing severe stock market crashes

== See also ==
- Kerb (disambiguation)
- Curb Your Enthusiasm, HBO comedy show
- Curb trading, trading of securities outside the mainstream stock exchange
