= 40-meter band =

Amateur radio frequency band

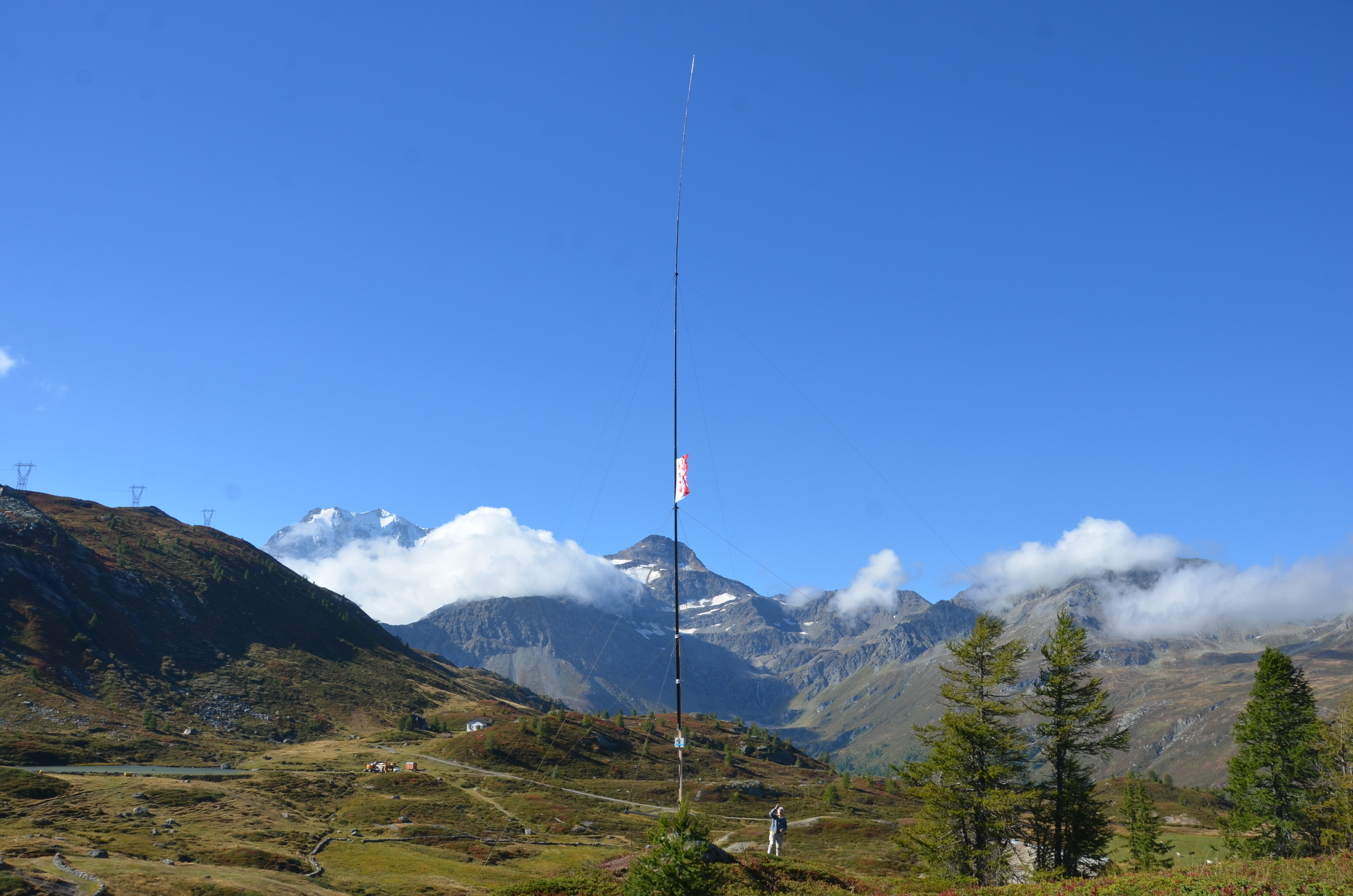
A HB9XBG full size vertical antenna for the 40m-band on Simplon Pass with view to Mount Fletschhorn

The 40-meter or 7-MHz band is an amateur radio frequency band, spanning 7.000-7.300 MHz in ITU Region 2, and 7.000-7.200 MHz in Regions 1 & 3. It is allocated to radio amateurs worldwide on a primary basis; however, only 7.000-7.200 MHz is exclusively allocated to amateur radio worldwide. Shortwave broadcasters and land mobile users also have primary allocations in some countries, and amateur stations must share the band with these users.

40-meters is considered one of the most reliable all-season long-distance communication (DX) and intercontinental bands.

== History ==
The 40-meter band was made available to amateurs in the United States by the Third National Radio Conference on October 10, 1924, and allocated on a worldwide basis by the International Radiotelegraph Conference in Washington, D.C., on October 4, 1927.

For many years, the portion of the band from 7.100 to 7.300 MHz was allocated to short wave broadcast stations outside the Americas, and was not available to radio amateurs outside of ITU Region 2. At the World Radio Conference WRC-03 in 2003, it was agreed that the broadcast stations would move out of the section 7.100–7.200 MHz on 29 March 2009 and that portion would become a worldwide exclusive amateur allocation afterwards. Releasing the remaining 100 kHz of the band to amateurs at a later date is an IARU aim for future conferences.

== Radio propagation characteristics ==
This band supports both long distance (DX) and intercontinental communications between late afternoon and a few hours after sunrise, and local-to-medium distance NVIS communication during most daylight hours.

With its combination of intracontinental and intercontinental communications possibilities, 40-meters is considered a key band in building a winning HF contesting score during any part of the sunspot cycle.

== Usage ==
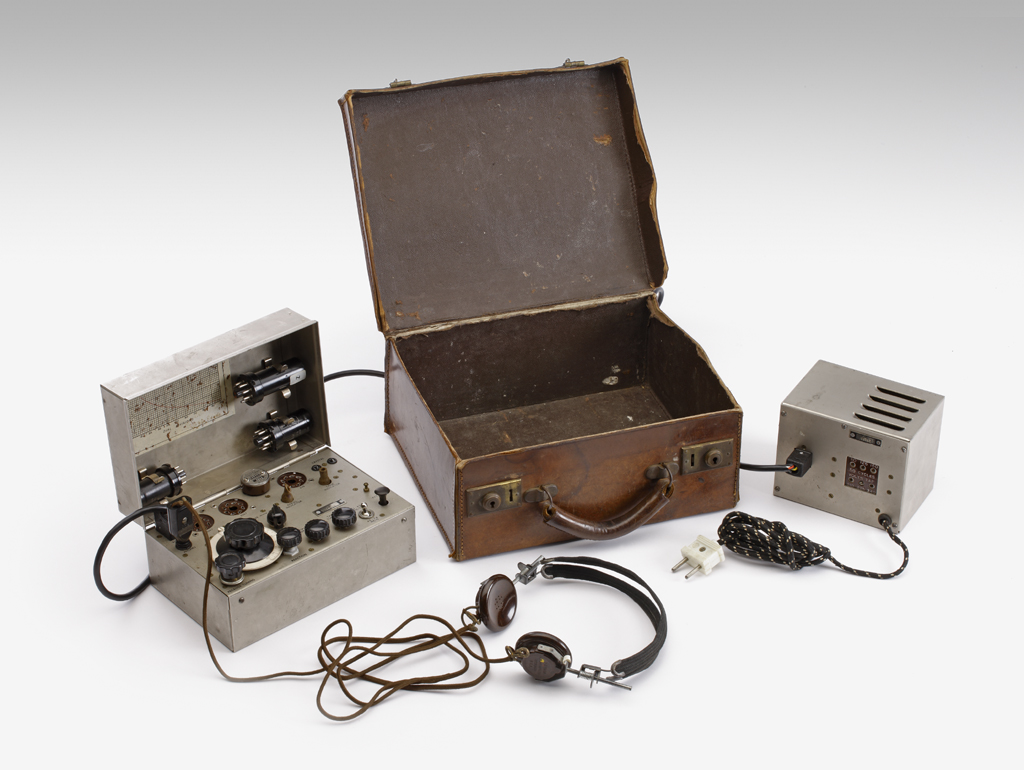
Paraset Mk.7 transceiver: 3.0 MHz to 7.6, output power: 4 watts to 5 watts

The band is most useful for long distance (DX) communications and intercontinental communication (ranges greater than 1,500 km or 1,000 miles) for one or two hours before sunset, during the night and for one or two hours after sunrise. It is extremely useful for local-to-medium distance communications out to a range of 600–1,500 km (370–930 mi) or more, depending on conditions, during the day. In higher latitudes, daytime intercontinental communication is also possible during the short days of winter, for example a good path often opens between Japan and northern Europe in the hours leading up to European midday from late November through late January, with a long path opening to the west coast of the United States and Canada after midday.

Due to the 24-hour nature of the band, the wide variety of ranges that can be spanned with it, and its shared nature, it tends to be extremely crowded, and interference from other amateurs and broadcasters often limits available and usable frequencies on this band.. In recent years amateurs in east and southeast Asia have also suffered severe interference from illegal users.

== Band plans ==
In most jurisdictions the subdivision of the band into different operating modes is according to informal convention rather than legal requirement.

=== IARU Region 1 ===
Europe, Africa, Middle East and Northern Asia

40 meters	7.000-7.040	7.040-7.050	7.050-7.060	7.060-7.200
IARU Region 1				

=== IARU Region 2 ===
The Americas

40 meters	7.000-7.040	7.040-7.050	7.050-7.300
IARU Region 2			

=== IARU Region 3 ===
Asia-Pacific

40 meters	7.000-7.025	7.025-7.030	7.030-7.040	7.040-7.500
IARU Region 3				

=== Japan ===
Changed on September 25, 2023. Immediately after the change, stations that ignore international practice and operate SSB on lower frequencies appeared.

License class	7.000–7.030	7.030–7.200
All classes		

=== Canada ===
Canada is part of region 2 and as such is subject to the IARU band plan. Radio Amateurs of Canada offers the bandplan below (effective 2023-06-01) as a recommendation for use by radio amateurs in that country but it does not have the force of law and should only be considered a suggestion or guideline.

License class	7.000–7.035	7.035-7.040	7.040-7.070	7.070-7.125	7.125-7.165	7.165-7.175	7.175–7.300
Basic(+), Advanced							

=== United States ===
U.S. license class	7.000–7.025	7.025–7.125	7.125–7.175	7.175–7.300
Novice / Technician				
General				
Advanced				
Extra				

==== Key ====
= CW only (US Novice/Technician: 200 W PEP maximum TPO)
= CW, RTTY and data (US: < 1 kHz bandwidth)
= CW, RTTY, data, MCW, test, phone and image
= CW, phone and image
= CW and SSB phone
= CW, RTTY, data, phone and image
= SSTV

== See also ==
- Shortwave bands
- Skywave

Range	Band	ITU Region 1	ITU Region 2	ITU Region 3
LF	2200 m	135.7–137.8 kHz		
MF	630 m	472–479 kHz		
MF	160 m	1.810–1.850 MHz	1.800–2.000 MHz	
HF	80 / 75 m	3.500–3.800 MHz	3.500–4.000 MHz	3.500–3.900 MHz
HF	60 m	5.3515–5.3665 MHz		
HF	40 m	7.000–7.200 MHz	7.000–7.300 MHz	7.000–7.200 MHz
HF	30 m^{[t2]}	10.100–10.150 MHz		
HF	20 m	14.000–14.350 MHz		
HF	17 m^{[t2]}	18.068–18.168 MHz		
HF	15 m	21.000–21.450 MHz		
HF	12 m^{[t2]}	24.890–24.990 MHz		
HF	10 m	28.000–29.700 MHz		
VHF	8 m^{[t3]}	40.000–40.700 MHz	—N/a	
VHF	6 m	50.000–52.000 MHz (50.000–54.000 MHz)^{[t4]}	50.000–54.000 MHz	
VHF	5 m^{[t3]}	58.000–60.100 MHz	—N/a	
VHF	4 m^{[t3]}	70.000–70.500 MHz	—N/a	
VHF	2 m	144.000–146.000 MHz	144.000–148.000 MHz	
VHF	1.25 m	—N/a	220.000–225.000 MHz	—N/a
UHF	70 cm	430.000–440.000 MHz	430.000–440.000 MHz (420.000–450.000 MHz)^{[t4]}	
UHF	33 cm	—N/a	902.000–928.000 MHz	—N/a
UHF	23 cm	1.240–1.300 GHz		
UHF	13 cm	2.300–2.450 GHz		
SHF	9 cm	3.400–3.475 GHz^{[t4]}	3.300–3.500 GHz	
SHF	5 cm	5.650–5.850 GHz	5.650–5.925 GHz	5.650–5.850 GHz
SHF	3 cm	10.000–10.500 GHz		
SHF	1.2 cm	24.000–24.250 GHz		
EHF	6 mm	47.000–47.200 GHz		
EHF	4 mm^{[t4]}	75.500 GHz^{[t3]} – 81.500 GHz	76.000–81.500 GHz	
EHF	2.5 mm	122.250–123.000 GHz		
EHF	2 mm	134.000–141.000 GHz		
EHF	1 mm	241.000–250.000 GHz		
THF	Sub-mm	Some administrations have authorized spectrum for amateur use in this region; others have declined to regulate frequencies above 300 GHz.		
[t1]	All allocations are subject to variation by country. For simplicity, only common allocations found internationally are listed. See a band's article for specifics.			
[t2]	HF allocation created at the 1979 World Administrative Radio Conference. These are commonly called the "WARC bands".			
[t3]	This is not mentioned in the ITU's Table of Frequency Allocations, but many individual administrations have commonly adopted this allocation under "Article 4.4".			
[t4]	This includes a currently active footnote allocation mentioned in the ITU's Table of Frequency Allocations. These allocations may only apply to a group of countries.			
See also: Radio spectrum, Electromagnetic spectrum
