= KLDS =

Radio station in Falfurrias, Texas

- Falfurrias, Texas; United States
- Broadcast area: Rio Grande Valley
- Frequency: 1260 kHz
- Branding: Radio Voz AM

Programming
- Language: Spanish
- Format: Religious

Ownership
- Owner: Bill Doerner, Valerie Smith, and Larry Roberts; (Sportsradiocc LLC)
- Sister stations: KDFM, KIBL

History
- First air date: January 1, 1953
- Former call signs: KBLP (1953–1956); KPSO (1956–1997)

Technical information
- Licensing authority: FCC
- Facility ID: 7149
- Class: B
- Power: 500 watts day 330 watts night
- Transmitter coordinates: 27°14′11″N 98°10′22″W

Links
- Public license information: Public file; LMS

KLDS (1260 AM, "Radio Voz AM") is a radio station licensed to serve Falfurrias, Texas, United States. The station is owned by Bill Doerner, Valerie Smith, and Larry Roberts, through licensee Sportsradiocc LLC.

KLDS broadcasts a Spanish-language religious radio format to the Rio Grande Valley and surrounding counties.

The radio station began operations in 1953 broadcasting as KBLP with 500 watts of power, daytime-only, on a frequency of 1260 kHz under the ownership of Ben L. Parker. In 1956, under new ownership, the station had its call sign changed to KPSO. The station was assigned the KLDS call sign by the Federal Communications Commission on December 19, 1997.
