= Shortwave bands =

List of shortwave radio spectrum bands

Shortwave bands are frequency allocations for use within the shortwave radio spectrum (the upper medium frequency [MF] band and all of the high frequency [HF] band). Radio waves in these frequency ranges can be used for very long distance (transcontinental) communication because they can reflect off layers of charged particles in the ionosphere and return to Earth beyond the horizon, a mechanism called skywave or “skip” propagation. They are allocated by the ITU for radio services such as maritime communications, international shortwave broadcasting and worldwide amateur radio. The bands are conventionally named by their wavelength (λ) in metres, for example the ‘20 meter band’. Radio propagation and possible communication distances vary depending on the time of day, the season and the level of solar activity.

== International broadcast bands ==
These bands are used by powerful long range AM radio stations, many operated by governments, which broadcast to multiple countries. Most international broadcasters use amplitude modulation with 5 kHz steps between channels; a few use single sideband or reduced carrier single sideband modulation. The World Radiocommunication Conference (WRC), organized under the auspices of the International Telecommunication Union, allocates bands for various services in periodic conferences. The most recent WRC took place in 2012. At WRC-97 in 1997, the following bands were allocated for international broadcasting:

Band (λ)	Frequency range (MHz)	Remarks
120 m	2.3–2.495	Mostly used locally in tropical regions, with time stations at 2.5 MHz. Although this is regarded as shortwave, it is a medium frequency band.
90 m	3.2–3.4	Mostly used locally in tropical regions, with limited long-distance reception at night.
75 m	3.9–4	Mostly used in the Eastern Hemisphere after dark; not widely received in North and South America. Shared with the North American amateur radio 80 m band.
60 m	4.75–4.995	Mostly used locally in tropical regions, especially Brazil, although widely usable at night. Time stations use 5 MHz.
49 m	5.9–6.2	Good year-round night band; daytime (long distance) reception poor
41 m	7.2–7.45	Reception varies by region—reasonably good night reception, but few transmitters in this band target North America. According to the WRC-03 Decisions on HF broadcasting, in International Telecommunication Union regions 1 and 3, the segment 7.1–7.2 MHz is reserved for amateur radio use and there are no new broadcasting allocations in this portion of the band. 7.35–7.4 MHz is newly allocated; in Regions 1 and 3, 7.4–7.45 MHz was also allocated effective March 29, 2009. In Region 2, 7.2–7.3 MHz is part of the amateur radio 40 m band.
31 m	9.4–9.9	Most heavily used band. Good year-round night band; seasonal during the day, with best reception in winter. Time stations are clustered around 10 MHz.
25 m	11.6–12.1	Generally best during summer and the period before and after sunset year-round
22 m	13.57–13.87	Substantially used in Eurasia. Similar to the 19 m band; best in summer.
19 m	15.1–15.8	Day reception good, night reception variable; best during summer. Time stations such as WWV use 15 MHz.
16 m	17.48–17.9	Day reception good; night reception varies seasonally, with summer best.
15 m	18.9–19.02	Lightly utilized; may become a Digital Radio Mondiale (DRM) band in future
13 m	21.45–21.85	Erratic daytime reception, with very little night reception. Similar to 11 metres, but long-distance daytime broadcasting (best on north–south paths) keeps this band active in the Asia-Pacific region.
11 m	25.67–26.1	Seldom used. Daytime reception is poor in the low solar cycle, but potentially excellent when the solar cycle (generally indicated by the number of sunspots) is high. Nighttime reception nonexistent, except for local groundwave propagation. DRM has proposed that this band be used for local digital shortwave broadcasts, testing the concept in Mexico City in 2005. Citizens band (CB) allocation in most countries, is slightly higher in frequency than the broadcasting 11m band. There are reports of pirate CB radio users operating equipment on frequencies as low as 25.615 MHz. In the United States, this band is also shared with remote pickup units (RPUs), from 25.87 to 26.1 MHz in FM mode.

Particularly in the United States and at frequencies under 10 MHz, shortwave broadcasters may operate in between those bands in bands allocated for fixed service, with the 60-meter band extending as high as 5.13 MHz, the 49-meter band down to 5.8 MHz, the 41-meter band as high as 7.78 MHz and the 31-meter band extending as low as 9.265 MHz.

== Amateur HF bands ==
Amateur radio operators in many countries are allocated several shortwave bands for private, non-commercial use. Amateur radio is a communications service, educational tool and hobby. It is particularly useful in providing emergency communication where standard telecommunications infrastructure is compromised or nonexistent, such as a disaster area or remote region of the globe.

== Marine, air, land mobile and fixed allocations ==
Designated bands in the shortwave spectrum are used for ships, aircraft, and land vehicles. Shortwave (HF radio) is used by transoceanic aircraft for communications with air-traffic control centers out of VHF radio range. Most countries with HF citizens'-band allocations use 40 or 80 channels between approximately 26.5 MHz and 27.9 MHz, in 10 kHz steps.

Due to antenna-length requirements and the band's long-distance propagation characteristics (undesirable in these cases), much land-mobile radio activity has moved to VHF or UHF and most cordless-phone use is at UHF or higher. Some segments of the HF spectrum are allocated for fixed services, providing point-to-point communication between sites with no access to wired communications.

Illegal "freeband" CB activity can be heard from 25 to 28 MHz, steps with operators generally using AM below 26.965 (US and European CB channel 1) and SSB above 27.405 (US and European CB channel 40). CB radio in the UK can be heard from 27.60125 to 27.99125 MHz in 10 kHz steps as well as the lower 26.965 to 27.405 MHz allocation.

The UK and Ireland both operate Community Audio Distribution (CADS) in the UK or Wireless Public Address System (WPAS) in Ireland services in the 27.600 to 27.995 MHz portion, AM and FM mode, with two overlapping sets of 40 channels (27.60125 to 27.99125 MHz in 10 kHz steps, and 27.605 to 27.995 MHz in 10 kHz steps). These transmissions are usually rebroadcasts of church services and can sometimes be heard hundreds or even thousands of km (miles). Part of the 11 m/27 MHz band was also allocated in many countries for early-model cordless phones.

== Military HF use ==
In the US and Canada, as well as the Americas (ITU Region 2) as a whole, there are no pre-designated HF allocations for military use. Similar rules exist in Europe, where it has become necessary for European amateurs to police the bands due to overcrowding. Most military HF band incursions into the HF ham bands occur in Europe or Africa. Since the end of the Cold War specific military HF allocations have gradually disappeared from the HF bands, except for Africa and some parts of Asia. In Australia, the military shares the HF bands with civilian users; this is mainly due to low population density and relative under-use of the HF bands. The military in the Americas and Australia has tended to use the civilian fixed, maritime mobile and aeronautical mobile allocations on an ad hoc (non-interference) basis.

== Industrial/Scientific/Medical (ISM) and other HF allocations ==
Above 10 MHz there are numerous frequencies set aside for radio astronomy, space research (FCC terminology) and standard- frequency-and-time services. RF diathermy equipment uses 27.12 MHz to heat bulk materials or adhesives for the purpose of drying or improving curing. The industrial use of the frequency suggested the use of the 11 m band for CB radio. About a dozen narrow ("sliver") allocations for ISM exist throughout the radio spectrum. These allocations are among the smallest in the HF band, with respect to national HF allocations.

== See also ==
- World Administrative Radio Conference
