= Near vertical incidence skywave =

Type of radio-wave propagation

Near vertical incidence skywave, or NVIS, is a skywave radio-wave propagation path that provides usable signals in the medium distances range — usually 0–650 km (0–400 miles). It is used for military and paramilitary communications, broadcasting, especially in the tropics, and by radio amateurs for nearby contacts circumventing line-of-sight barriers. The radio waves travel near-vertically upwards into the ionosphere, where they are refracted back down and can be received within a circular region up to 650 km (400 miles) from the transmitter. If the frequency is too high (that is, above the critical frequency of the ionospheric F layer), refraction is insufficient to return the signal to earth and if it is too low, absorption in the ionospheric D layer may reduce the signal strength.

There is no fundamental difference between NVIS and conventional skywave propagation; the practical distinction arises solely from different desirable radiation patterns of the antennas (near vertical for NVIS, near horizontal for conventional long-range skywave propagation).

== Frequencies and propagation ==
NVIS radiation pattern While the groundwave (blue) cannot propagate, the refracted skywaves (red) achieve HF coverage within the common first hop (~500 km or 310 miles).

The most reliable frequencies for NVIS communications are between 1.8 MHz and 8 MHz. Above 8 MHz, the probability of success begins to decrease, dropping to near zero at 30 MHz. Usable frequencies are dictated by local ionospheric conditions, which have a strong systematic dependence on geographical location. Common bands used in amateur radio at mid-latitudes are 3.5 MHz at night and 7 MHz during daylight, with experimental use of 5 MHz (60 m) frequencies. During winter nights at the bottom of the sunspot cycle, the 1.8 MHz band may be required. Broadcasting uses the tropical broadcast bands between 2.3 and 5.06 MHz, and the international broadcast bands between 3.9 and 6.2 MHz. Military NVIS communications mostly take place on 2–4 MHz at night, and 5–7 MHz during daylight.

Optimum NVIS frequencies tend to be higher towards the tropics and lower towards the arctic regions. They are also higher during high sunspot activity years. The usable frequencies change from day to night, because sunlight causes the lowest layer of the ionosphere, called the D layer, to increase, causing attenuation of low frequencies during the day while the maximum usable frequency (MUF) which is the critical frequency of the F layer rises with greater sunlight. Real-time maps of the critical frequency are available. Use of a frequency about 15% below the critical frequency should provide reliable NVIS service. This is sometimes referred to as the optimum working frequency or FOT.

NVIS is most useful in mountainous areas where line-of-sight propagation is ineffective, or when the communication distance is beyond the 80 km (50 miles) range of groundwave (or the terrain is so rugged and barren that groundwave is not effective), and less than the 500–2,400 km (300–1,500 miles) range of lower-angle sky-wave propagation. Direction finding of the NVIS sender is more difficult than for ground-wave communication (i.e. VHF or UHF). For broadcasters, NVIS allows coverage of an entire medium-sized country at much lower cost than with VHF (FM), and daytime coverage, similar to mediumwave (AM broadcast) nighttime coverage at lower cost and often with less interference.

== Antennas ==
An NVIS antenna configuration is a horizontally polarized (parallel with the surface of the earth) radiating element that is from 1/ 20 th wavelength (λ) to 1 /4 wave above the ground. The optimum height of such an antenna is about 1 /4 wavelength, and high angle radiation declines only slightly for heights up to about 3 /8 wave. That proximity to the ground forces the majority of the radiation to go straight up, causing NVIS propagation to occur. The overall efficiency of the antenna can be increased by placing a ground wire, slightly longer than the antenna, parallel to and directly underneath the antenna. A single ground wire can provide antenna gain in the 3–6 dB range. This is a reflector element used to form a 2-element Yagi beam antenna. The wire length for the reflector element is 5% longer than the dipole-driven element positioned above it. The dipole is located at a distance of 0.15 wavelengths above the reflector element. The reflector wire is hung between two insulators and doesn't make contact with any other objects. It can be mounted a few inches above the ground or at a maximum height of 10 feet (or 3 meters) above the soil. This height allows for convenient lawn mowing without any disruptions. Essentially, this antenna consists of a 2-element beam that is oriented vertically.

Another source indicates 2 dB for a single wire and nearly 4 dB for multiple ground wires. Ground wires are more necessary when using lower dipoles over poor soils as without them considerable energy goes into heat and not the radio waves.

Depending on the specific requirements, various antennas (i.e. Sloper, T2FD, Dipole) can be used for NVIS communication, with horizontal dipoles or inverted V dipoles at about 1 /5 wavelength above ground giving the best results on transmit and at about 1 /6 wavelength on receive, according to military sources and an extensive study by Dutch researchers. Very low antennas are far more inferior on both transmit and receive, where noise and signal are attenuated.

Significant increases in communication will obviously be realized when both the transmitting station and the receiving station use NVIS configuration for their antennas. In particular, for low profile operations, NVIS antennas are a good option.

For broadcasting, typical antennas consist of a dipole about 1 /4 wavelength above ground, or arrays of such dipoles. Up to 16 dipoles can be used, allowing strong signals with relatively low power by concentrating the signal in a smaller receiving area. Limiting the coverage may be dictated by licensing, language, or political considerations. Arrays of dipoles can be used to "slew" the pattern so that the transmitter need not be in the center of the coverage footprint. Broadcast NVIS antennas usually use an extensive ground screen to increase gain and stabilize the pattern and feed impedance with changing ground moisture.

=== AS-2259 antenna ===
AS-2259 NVIS antenna

One popular military NVIS antenna is the AS-2259 Antenna, which consists of two V-shaped dipoles: The four dipole wires also serve as guy wire for the antenna mast. An alternative configuration consists of a transmitting loop antenna which is configured for maximum signal transmission upwards.
