= Skip zone =

Area where radio transmissions can not be received

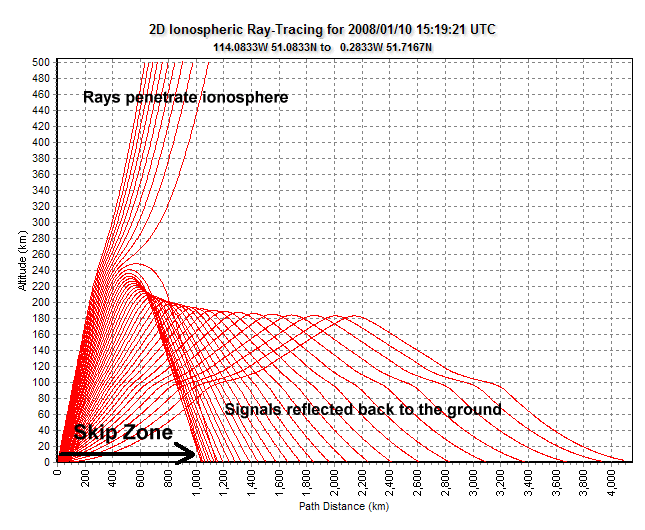
Formation of a skip zone using Proplab-Pro 3

A skip zone, also called a silent zone or zone of silence, is a region where a radio transmission can not be received. The zone is located between regions both closer and further from the transmitter where reception is possible.

== Cause ==
When using medium to high-frequency radio telecommunication, there are radio waves which travel both parallel to the ground, and towards the ionosphere, referred to as a ground wave and sky wave, respectively. A skip zone is an annular region between the furthest points at which the ground wave can be received and the nearest point at which the refracted sky waves can be received. Within this region, no signal can be received because, due to the conditions of the local ionosphere, the relevant sky waves are not reflected, but penetrate the ionosphere.

The skip zone is a natural phenomenon that cannot be influenced by technical means. Its width depends on the height and shape of the ionosphere and, particularly, on the local ionospheric maximum electron density characterized by critical frequency f_{o}F_{2}. It mainly varies with this parameter, being larger for low f_{o}F_{2}. With a fixed working frequency, it is large by night and may even disappear by day. Transmitting at night is most effective for long-distance communication, but the skip zone becomes significantly larger. Very high frequency waves and higher normally travel through the ionosphere wherefore communication via skywave is exceptional. A highly ionized Es-Layer that can occasionally appear in summer may produce such Sporadic E propagation.

== Avoidance ==
If the radio wave frequency is decreased, a point is reached where all waves (even vertically incident waves) are reflected back to the Earth.

A method of decreasing the skip zone is by decreasing the frequency of the radio waves. Decreasing the frequency is akin to increasing the ionospheric width. A point is eventually reached when decreasing the frequency results in a zero distance skip zone. In other words, a frequency exists for which vertically incident radio waves will always be refracted back to the Earth. This frequency is equivalent to the ionospheric plasma frequency and is also known as the ionospheric critical frequency, or f_{o}F_{2}.

== Other ==
Skip zone is the subject of a film 'SKIPZONE' made in 1992 by UK artist, Peter Lee-Jones. It refers to areas in Scottish Highlands where it is difficult to obtain radio and TV reception.

In the episode "Short Wave" of Father Knows Best, the family hears a distress call from a boat at sea. Jim explains the reason they, and not the Coast Guard, can hear the transmission is because of a "skip".

== See also ==
- Shortwave

== Sources ==
- This article incorporates public domain material from Federal Standard 1037C. General Services Administration. Archived from the original on 2022-01-22. (in support of MIL-STD-188).
