= Kerber =

Kerber may refer to:

- Kerber (surname), including a list of people with that name
- Kerber (band), a Serbian rock band
