= 80-meter band =

Amateur radio frequency band

The 80-meter band, also known as the 3.5 MHz band, is a range of radio frequencies allocated to the amateur radio service. In ITU Region 2, which includes North and South America, the amateur allocation generally extends from 3.5 to 4.0 MHz. In Region 1, covering Europe, Africa, and northern Asia, it generally extends from 3.5 to 3.8 MHz, while in Region 3, covering southern and eastern Asia and the Pacific, it generally extends from 3.5 to 3.9 MHz. (Note: Individual countries may have different amateur allocations within these ranges.)

The upper portion of the band is commonly used for voice communications and is sometimes referred to as the 75-meter band. In Europe, however, the term "75 meters" can also refer to an overlapping shortwave broadcasting range from 3.9 to 4.0 MHz used by some national broadcasting services.

Because of absorption by the ionosphere's Sun-activated D layer, the 80-meter band is generally more effective for local and regional communication during daylight hours. Long-distance propagation becomes more favorable after sunset, when D-layer absorption decreases. During the evening and nighttime, the band can support short- and medium-distance contacts, with typical ranges extending from local contacts to approximately 1,000 miles (1,600 km) or more, depending on atmospheric and ionospheric conditions. Under favorable propagation conditions, longer-distance and intercontinental contacts are also possible.

== Overview ==
The nominal "80 meter" band begins at 3.5 MHz (85.7 m wavelength) and goes up to 4.0 MHz (74.9 m wavelength). The upper part of the band, mostly used for voice, is often referred to as 75 meters, since in Region 2, the wavelengths in that section are between 80–75 meters (adjacent to or overlapping a shortwave broadcast band called by the same name: "75 m").

=== Natural and human-made noise ===
80 meters can be plagued with noise: The same ionospheric refraction that makes long-distance shortwave propagation possible also traps terrestrial noise under the ionosphere, preventing it from dissipating into space, which quiets down radio bands at higher frequencies, above ~20 MHz. The 80 m rural noise floor is mostly determined by noise produced by distant tropical thunderstorms and cumulative regional sources of human-made static. The urban and suburban 80 m noise floor is typically set by the amount of noise generated locally, from electrical machinery and household electronics, and is generally 10–20 dB stronger than typical rural noise.

On 80 meters, nearly all areas of the world are subject to weather-induced noise from regionally local thunderstorms, and combined distant lightning strikes from tropical thunderstorms that perpetually supply world-wide a continuous source of radio static.

=== Daytime and nighttime use ===
The 80 meter band is favoured for ragchews between amateurs within a range of 500 miles / 800 km. During contests the band is filled with activity beginning before sunset and continuing all through the night.

The ionosphere's D layer significantly affects the 80 meter band by absorbing signals. During the daylight hours, a station in middle or high latitudes using 100 watts and a simple dipole antenna can expect a maximum communication range of 200 miles (320 km), extending to a few thousand miles or more at night.

Global coverage can be routinely achieved at high latitudes during the late fall and winter, by stations using modest power and common antennas. The higher background noise on 80 meters, especially when combined with higher ionospheric absorption, causes transmitting stations with higher effective radiated power to have a decided advantage in being heard by long-distance receiving stations. With very high transmitting antennas or large vertically polarized arrays and full legal power, reliable worldwide communications occurs over nighttime paths. Good receiving antennas have far more modest requirements to reliably get signals from worldwide sources.

=== Cumbersome large antennas ===
Antennas for 3.5 MHz are large: For example, a quarter-wave vertical sized to resonate at 3.6 MHz is approximately 65 feet (20 meters) high; for reasonable antenna efficiency, even a reduced-size antenna needs to be a large fraction (≳ 2 / 3 ) of that height, which is still a formidable construction project for an amateur. Erecting such large antennas and ensuring the antennas radiate significant power at low angles are two of the challenges facing amateurs wishing to communicate over long distances. Amateurs interested in regional communication can use low wire antennas, such as horizontal dipoles, inverted vee dipole antennas or loop antennas on this band. Horizontally polarized antennas closer than a quarter-wave to earth produce predominantly high-angle radiation, which is useful for short-distance propagation modes, such as near vertical incidence skywave. Nonetheless, occasional favorable propagation conditions make substantial distances still possible with modest-height antennas.

Mobile radio operation with portable antennas is still possible, but the relatively short length of practical mobile antennas compared to a quarter-wave antenna – usually under 10 feet (3.0 meters) vs. around 65 feet (20 meters) tall – results in the need to compensate with a large inductive loading coil to bring the antenna to resonance. However a large coil loses power through resistive heating of its wire, and that wire resistance is always high enough to compete for RF power against the antenna's meager effective radiation resistance. Since short antennas have very low radiation resistance, the majority of their fed power is lost to heat, and their efficiency is typically below 10%: roughly 90% of the input power is lost to wire and ground resistance. Additionally, the large inductance of the loading coil creates an antenna system with an extremely narrow bandwidth (very high Q), which can be good for reducing received noise, but makes changing frequency a challenge, since one must retune the loading coil's inductance.

== History ==
The 80 meter band was made available to amateurs in the United States by the Third National Radio Convention in 1924. The band was allocated on a worldwide basis by the International Radiotelegraph Convention in 1927.

== Propagation ==
As the maximum usable frequency for long-distance communication seldom dips below 3.5 MHz anywhere on the planet, the main propagation barrier to long-distance communication is heavy D-layer absorption during the daytime, ensuring that DX paths must be largely, although not entirely, in darkness. At times, there is pronounced dark-side gray-line propagation, which is most useful on polar routes, away from equatorial thunderstorm activity.

At higher latitudes, a noticeable skip zone sometimes appears on the band during nighttime hours in midwinter, which can be as much as 300 miles / 500 km, rendering communication with closer stations impossible. This is not generally a problem at middle or equatorial latitudes, or for large parts of the year anywhere, but it does occasionally limit local wintertime traffic on the band in areas such as Northern Europe, the northern tier of the United States and Canada.

During spring and summer (year-round in the tropics), lightning from distant storms creates significantly higher background noise levels, often becoming an insurmountable obstacle to maintaining normal communications. Nearby convective weather activity during the summer months can make the band completely unusable, even for local communications. In the winter months during the peak years of the sunspot cycle, auroral effects can also render the band useless for hours at a time.

== Frequency allocations ==
The International Telecommunication Union allocated the whole 500 kHz from 3.5–4.0 MHz to amateurs in the Americas, and 3.5–3.8 MHz or 3.5–3.9 MHz to amateurs in other parts of the world. However, amateurs outside the Americas must share this useful piece of spectrum with other users, usually on a joint primary basis. As a result, authorities in the affected parts of the world restrict amateur allocations between 3.7 MHz and the top of the band.

Some allocations are as follows:

| Country or Area | ITU; Region | Allocation (in MHz) | Refs |
| Argentina | 2 | 3.500–3.750, 3.790–3.800 | — |
| Australia | 3 | 3.500–3.700, 3.776–3.800 | (Note: In Australia the upper 3.776–3.800 MHz band segment is a DX window, only allowed for amateurs with advanced licenses.) |
| Canada | 2 | 3.500–4.000 |
| Europe | 1 | 3.500–3.800 |
| India | 3 | 3.500–3.700, 3.890–3.900 |
| Japan | 3 | 3.500–3.580, 3.599–3.612, 3.662–3.687, 3.702–3.716, 3.745–3.770, 3.791–3.805 |
| Korea | 3 | 3.500–3.550, 3.790–3.800 | (Note: In Korea the 3.520–3.525 MHz sub-band is for digital messaging.) |
| New Zealand | 3 | 3.500–3.900 |
| Russia | 1 | 3.500–3.800 |
| United States | 2 | 3.500–4.000 |

=== Lower band edge ===
As is common for many other wide amateur bands, the lower edge of 80 meters is predominantly used for radio telegraphy (called "CW"), with the lower 10 kHz (3.5–3.51 MHz) primarily used for long-distance communications. It is common for illegal marine operations, generally using USB voice ("phone"), to occupy frequencies on the low end of 80 meters. Most intrusions of this type are from fishing vessels and their marker buoys; although most of those vessels are from SE Asia and South American ports, some band intrusions are committed by fishing vessels based in ports in the USA and Canada.

=== Upper band edge ===
For Canadian and U.S. Amateurs with infeasibly perfect transmitters, the highest usable frequency in the 80 m band for lower side band voice ("phone") would be 3.999 MHz. But depending on quality and condition of radio, audio characteristics, and proper adjustments the bulk of emissions on lower sideband will typically occupy 3.9970–3.9997 MHz. All SSB transceivers have third- and fifth-order products of significant level, typically only 30–35 dB below PEP for third order intermodulation. This means any operation above 3.998 MHz even lower sideband (LSB) comes with some risk of illegal emissions, even with good equipment.

It is a common misconception that operating a transmitter set at 3.9997 MHz is not legal, since emissions extend beyond the 4.000 MHz band edge; this is true for some forms of modulation, but not all, and is challenging to measure accurately. In general, high quality receivers or frequency-selective RF power-level meters have better dynamic range, hence more acute signal detection, than all but the best spectrum analyzers, and are excellent for detecting out-of-band emissions when used properly. While some operators reporting out-of-band emissions might have used a wide receiver bandwidth, receiver bandwidth expands the measured transmitter bandwidth, so the perceived bandwidth seems wider than it actually is: Any measurement of out-of-band emissions using a receiver should be made with it set to a significantly narrower bandwidth than the transmitter's – for example, a narrow "CW" mode.

Inexpensive spectrum analyzers, spectrum scopes, and panadaptors generally are not useful for measuring bandwidth, either on-air or off-air. Wide detection bandwidth, slow sweep rates, and common, loud, local ambient noise all mask the presumably weak emissions that survive a transmitter's internal filtering. Although voice ("phone") modes like upper side band, amplitude, or frequency modulation transmitted at a nominal 3.999 MHz will certainly modulate across the 4.0 MHz band edge and are against licensing regulations, a few very narrow-band data modes – like CW – can be used, as long as the power of the emissions beyond the band edge that get past the transmitting system's filtering remain insignificantly low.

== Broadcast interference ==
The European 75 m shortwave broadcast band overlaps the upper edge of the 80 m ham band allocation in the Americas. When it is night on both ends of the transmission path some broadcasters in Asia and Europe can be heard in North America between 3.9–4.0 MHz. On an SSB receiver this produces a tone in the received audio when the station is broadcasting with conventional amplitude modulation, or white noise if the station is transmitting Digital Radio Mondiale (DRM). Setting an SSB receiver to the exact frequency of the AM carrier can blank out the carrier tone, but the audio signal often can still be heard. If a DRM signal is strong enough, its noise may mask weak amateur signals. Most DRM signals occupy 9 or 10 kHz of bandwidth.

== See also ==
- Shortwave bands

| Range | Band | ITU Region 1 | ITU Region 2 | ITU Region 3 |
|---|---|---|---|---|
| LF | 2200 m | 135.7–137.8 kHz | | |
| MF | 630 m | 472–479 kHz | | |
| MF | 160 m | 1.810–1.850 MHz | 1.800–2.000 MHz | |
| HF | 80 / 75 m | 3.500–3.800 MHz | 3.500–4.000 MHz | 3.500–3.900 MHz |
| HF | 60 m | 5.3515–5.3665 MHz | | |
| HF | 40 m | 7.000–7.200 MHz | 7.000–7.300 MHz | 7.000–7.200 MHz |
| HF | 30 m^{[t2]} | 10.100–10.150 MHz | | |
| HF | 20 m | 14.000–14.350 MHz | | |
| HF | 17 m^{[t2]} | 18.068–18.168 MHz | | |
| HF | 15 m | 21.000–21.450 MHz | | |
| HF | 12 m^{[t2]} | 24.890–24.990 MHz | | |
| HF | 10 m | 28.000–29.700 MHz | | |
| VHF | 8 m^{[t3]} | 40.000–40.700 MHz | —N/a | |
| VHF | 6 m | 50.000–52.000 MHz (50.000–54.000 MHz)^{[t4]} | 50.000–54.000 MHz | |
| VHF | 5 m^{[t3]} | 58.000–60.100 MHz | —N/a | |
| VHF | 4 m^{[t3]} | 70.000–70.500 MHz | —N/a | |
| VHF | 2 m | 144.000–146.000 MHz | 144.000–148.000 MHz | |
| VHF | 1.25 m | —N/a | 220.000–225.000 MHz | —N/a |
| UHF | 70 cm | 430.000–440.000 MHz | 430.000–440.000 MHz (420.000–450.000 MHz)^{[t4]} | |
| UHF | 33 cm | —N/a | 902.000–928.000 MHz | —N/a |
| UHF | 23 cm | 1.240–1.300 GHz | | |
| UHF | 13 cm | 2.300–2.450 GHz | | |
| SHF | 9 cm | 3.400–3.475 GHz^{[t4]} | 3.300–3.500 GHz | |
| SHF | 5 cm | 5.650–5.850 GHz | 5.650–5.925 GHz | 5.650–5.850 GHz |
| SHF | 3 cm | 10.000–10.500 GHz | | |
| SHF | 1.2 cm | 24.000–24.250 GHz | | |
| EHF | 6 mm | 47.000–47.200 GHz | | |
| EHF | 4 mm^{[t4]} | 75.500 GHz^{[t3]} – 81.500 GHz | 76.000–81.500 GHz | |
| EHF | 2.5 mm | 122.250–123.000 GHz | | |
| EHF | 2 mm | 134.000–141.000 GHz | | |
| EHF | 1 mm | 241.000–250.000 GHz | | |
| THF | Sub-mm | Some administrations have authorized spectrum for amateur use in this region; others have declined to regulate frequencies above 300 GHz. | | |
| [t1] | All allocations are subject to variation by country. For simplicity, only common allocations found internationally are listed. See a band's article for specifics. | | | |
| [t2] | HF allocation created at the 1979 World Administrative Radio Conference. These are commonly called the "WARC bands". | | | |
| [t3] | This is not mentioned in the ITU's Table of Frequency Allocations, but many individual administrations have commonly adopted this allocation under "Article 4.4". | | | |
| [t4] | This includes a currently active footnote allocation mentioned in the ITU's Table of Frequency Allocations. These allocations may only apply to a group of countries. | | | |
See also: Radio spectrum, Electromagnetic spectrum
