= KERB-FM =

Radio station in Kermit, Texas

Kermit, Texas; United States
- Frequency: 106.3 MHz

Programming
- Format: Defunct (was Spanish religious)

Ownership
- Owner: La Radio Cristiana Network, Inc.

History
- First air date: 1986
- Last air date: March 15, 2021
- Former call signs: KGRA (1984–1986)

Technical information
- Licensing authority: FCC
- Facility ID: 57520
- Class: A
- ERP: 3,000 watts
- HAAT: 84.0 meters
- Transmitter coordinates: 31°50′5.00″N 103°8′10.00″W

Links
- Public license information: Public file; LMS

KERB-FM (106.3 FM) was a radio station broadcasting a Spanish religious format in Kermit, Texas. The station was last owned by La Radio Cristiana Network, Inc.

== History ==
In 1984, Hispanic Broadcasting Company obtained the construction permit for a new, 3,000-watt FM radio station at 106.3 FM in Kermit. A year later, the permit was sold to the owners of KERB, the daytime-only AM radio station in town, and signed on as KERB-FM in 1986, when the station filed for its license to cover.

In March 1988, owners M.F. and Jean Welch agreed to transfer control of KERB Broadcasting, Inc., to Marlin D. Kuykendall. The Federal Communications Commission (FCC) approved the transfer on April 12, 1988, and the move was consummated on May 1, 1988. Less than two years later, the station faced financial difficulties, and in January 1991, the KERB and KERB-FM broadcast licenses were involuntarily transferred from KERB Broadcasting, Inc., to Ron White acting as receiver. The FCC approved the move on February 15, 1991.

In September 1991, receiver Ron White found a buyer for both stations and applied to transfer the broadcast licenses on Mesa Entertainment, Inc., owners of Odessa's KOZA radio. The FCC approved the deal on November 4, 1991, and after extended complications the transaction was consummated on March 15, 1996, though Mesa began running KERB/KERB-FM by 1994.

In March 1997, Mesa Entertainment, Inc., made a deal to sell KERB and KERB-FM to La Radio Cristiana Network, Inc. The FCC approved the sale on May 20, 1997, and formal consummation of the transaction occurred on September 15, 1997.

La Radio Cristiana Network was approved in 2002 to upgrade KERB-FM to broadcast with 23,500 watts, which was never prosecuted, leaving KERB-FM still at 3,000 watts. In 2013, the license for sister station KERB was turned in to the FCC.

On July 19, 2019, La Radio Cristiana Network filed to sell KERB-FM to Isaac and Brenda Díaz for $150,000.

On March 15, 2021, the FCC cancelled the KERB-FM license due to false statements made by La Radio Cristiana Network.
