= Utility station =

Radio station broadcasting signals not intended for the general public

The term utility station is used to describe fixed radio broadcasters disseminating signals that are not intended for reception by the general public (but such members are not actively prohibited from receiving). Utility stations, as the name suggests, do broadcast signals that have an immediate practical use, by means of analog or usually digital modes; most often utility transmissions are of a "point-to-point" nature, intended for a specific receiving station. Utility stations are most prevalent on shortwave frequencies, though they are not restricted to the shortwave frequencies.

== Examples of utility station and modes ==
One common use of utility stations is disseminating weather information. Weather information is often broadcast using RTTY and sending synoptic codes, or weather charts are sent using radiofax, which are used by mariners and others. Airports make voice weather broadcasts on HF, known as VOLMET. Some examples include New York Radio, which broadcasts weather information for locations in the eastern United States, or Shanwick Radio, which does the same for Europe.

HF frequencies are still often used for trans-oceanic air traffic control. News agencies previously used RTTY for news stories, and, less commonly, radiofax for the images, although this is no longer done. Satellite communications and the Internet have replaced HF for this application.

Many maritime radio services are often known as utility stations, including as ship-to-shore and vice versa telephony and error-correcting radioteletype such as SITOR.

Military use of shortwave is also common, but nearly all transmissions are encrypted, with voice encrypted using modes such as ANDVT. Data transmission may make use of encrypted RTTY, use Link-11 for radar tracking data, or use of Automatic Link Establishment (ALE) modes to set up communication links automatically.

Some utility stations are on other frequency bands, including NOAA Weather Radio, traveler information stations, and the like; other utility-type signals are piggybacked on FM broadcast subcarriers.

== See also ==
- Coast radio station
- Shortwave listening
