= KIBL =

Radio station in Beeville, Texas

- Beeville, Texas; United States
- Broadcast area: Corpus Christi, Texas
- Frequency: 1490 kHz
- Branding: No Bull Radio

Programming
- Format: Classic country

Ownership
- Owner: David Martin Phillip; (Rufus Resources, LLC)

History
- First air date: 1949
- Last air date: October 1, 2026

Technical information
- Licensing authority: FCC
- Facility ID: 74441
- Class: C
- Power: 1,000 watts unlimited
- Transmitter coordinates: 28°23′9″N 97°43′43″W
- Translator: 97.1 K246CP (Beeville)

Links
- Public license information: Public file; LMS
- Website: www.nobullradio.com

KIBL (1490 AM) was a radio station broadcasting a classic country format. Licensed to Beeville, Texas, United States, the station served the Corpus Christi metropolitan area. The station was owned by David Martin Phillip, through licensee Rufus Resources, LLC.

== History ==
KIBL's first license was issued on November 8, 1949. On April 20, 2019, KIBL flipped from Spanish Christian radio programming to the country "No Bull Radio Network" owned by Rufus Resources. It had previously been owned by La Radio Cristiana Network.

As a "No Bull Radio" station, KIBL operated as part of a regional network of classic country stations in South Texas based at KCAF-FM in Kenedy. On October 1, 2026, Rufus Resources surrendered all its licenses, including KIBL, to the Federal Communications Commission; the "No Bull Radio" programming continues as an Internet radio station via Live365, with Rufus noting the shutdown eliminates the geographic limits to its AM and FM signals. The license was cancelled on October 5.
