= List of amateur radio magazines =

This is a list of magazines that focus on topics related to amateur radio. It is not complete by any means.

| Magazine | Country | Language | Frequency | Published |
|---|---|---|---|---|
| Revista RCA | Argentina | Spanish | Quarterly | 1924–present |
| Revista QTC | Argentina | Spanish | Monthly | 1962–present |
| Radio Revista | Argentina | Spanish | Monthly | 1922–1937 |
| Revista Telegráfica Electrónica | Argentina | Spanish | Monthly | 1912–2001 |
| QSP | Argentina | Spanish | Monthly | 1978–1999 |
| Amateur Radio | Australia | English | Bimonthly | 1933–present |
| QTC | Australia | English | Monthly | 2020-present |
| OEM — Mitteilungsblatt des ÖVSV | Austria | German | Monthly | 1933–1974 |
| QSP Amateurfunkjournal | Austria | German | Monthly | 1975–present |
| Radiolubitel | Belarus | Russian | Monthly | 1991–present |
| CQ-QSO | Belgium | French, Dutch (Flemish) | Bimonthly | 1926–present |
| CQ F6 | Belgium | French | Monthly | 1964–1974 |
| Boletín RCB | Bolivia | Spanish | Irregularly | 1954–1998 |
| Sintonía DX | Bolivia | Spanish | Irregularly | 1983–1993 |
| Revista Antenna | Brazil | Portuguese | Monthly | 1926–present |
| Revista Eletrônica (LABRE) | Brazil | Portuguese | Quarterly | ~1930–present |
| Revista QSO | Brazil | Portuguese | Monthly | 2020–present |
| Revista Radioamadorismo | Brazil | Portuguese | Monthly | 2014–present |
| Radio | Bulgaria | Bulgarian | Monthly | 1952–1956 |
| Radio i televizia | Bulgaria | Bulgarian | Monthly | 1957–1969 |
| Radio, televizia, elektronika | Bulgaria | Bulgarian | Monthly | 1970–2002 |
| The Canadian Amateur | Canada | English, French | Bimonthly | |
| The Communicator | Canada | English | Bi-Monthly | ~2000–present |
| Chile Radio Magazine | Chile | Spanish | Monthly | 1923-1924 |
| Revista del Radio Club de Chile | Chile | Spanish | Quarterly | 1941–1989 |
| Wuxiandian | China | Chinese | Monthly | 1955–present |
| Ham's CQ | China | Chinese | Quarterly | 1999-2011 |
| Radio | Colombia | Spanish | Monthly | 1933–1941 |
| Revista LCRA | Colombia | Spanish | Bimonthly | 1954–1996 |
| Radio HRS | Croatia | Croatian | Bimonthly | 1992–2014 |
| Selvamar Noticias | Spain | Spanish | Monthly | 2020–present |
| FRC (Boletín Informativo) | Cuba | Spanish | Weekly | 1966–present |
| Radio Aficionado | Cuba | Spanish | Monthly | 2024–present |
| Radioamatér | Czech Republic | Czech, Slovak | Monthly | 1922–present |
| Amatérské Rádio | Czech Republic | Czech, Slovak | Monthly | 1952–present |
| OZ | Denmark | Danish | Quarterly | 1929–present |
| CQ EGYPT | Egypt | Arabic, English | Bimonthly | 2011–2014 |
| Raadio | Estonia | Estonian | Weekly | 1926–1938 |
| ES-QTC | Estonia | Estonian | Quarterly | 1990–present |
| Radioamatööri | Finland | Finnish | Monthly | 1950–present |
| Onde Magazine | France | French | Monthly | 1922–1939 |
| Radio-REF | France | French | Monthly | 1925–present |
| MegaHertz Magazine | France | French | Monthly | 1982–2010 |
| CQ DL | Germany | German | Monthly | 1972–present |
| Funkamateur | Germany | German | Monthly | 1952–present |
| SV NEA | Greece | Greek | Bimonthly | 1988–present |
| Rádiótechnika | Hungary | Hungarian | Monthly | 1936–2021 |
| CQ TF | Iceland | Icelandic, English | Quarterly | 1964–present |
| Ham Radio News | India | English | Quarterly | 1954–present |
| NIAR Newsletter | India | English | Biannual | 1983–present |
| CQ Nusantara | Indonesia | Indonesian | Monthly | 1978–1990 |
| BeON | Indonesia | Indonesian | Monthly | 2002–2010 |
| m-ORARI | Indonesia | Indonesian | Bimonthly | 2020–present |
| Echo Ireland | Ireland | English | Quarterly | 1948–present |
| HaGal HaHadash | Israel | Hebrew | Bimonthly | 1959–present |
| Il Radiogiornale | Italy | Italian | Monthly | 1923–1946 |
| RadioRivista | Italy | Italian | Monthly | 1948–present |
| CQ Elettronica | Italy | Italian | Monthly | 1959–2013 |
| Elettronica Flash | Italy | Italian | Monthly | 1983–2014 |
| CQ ham radio | Japan | Japanese | Monthly | 1946–present |
| Five Nine | Japan | Japanese | Monthly | |
| Radiolubitel Kazakhstana | Kazakhstan | Russian | Irregularly | 2010–2013 |
| RSEA Circular | Kenya | English | Monthly | 1947–1964 |
| Radio | Latvia | Latvian | Bimonthly | 1926–1930 |
| Radio-Amatieris | Latvia | Latvian | Monthly | 1929–1932 |
| Radio Abonents | Latvia | Latvian | Monthly | 1932–1939 |
| LY QTC | Lithuania | Lithuanian | Irregularly | 1989–2011 |
| Revista Onda Corta | Mexico | Spanish | Bimonthly | 1934–present |
| Revista Electrónica Amateur Radio México | Mexico | Spanish | Bimonthly | 2019–present |
| Electron | Netherlands | Dutch | Monthly | 1946–present |
| Radio Bulletin | Netherlands | Dutch | Monthly | 1932–2007 |
| Break-In | New Zealand | English | Bimonthly | 1928–present |
| New Zealand and Australian Amateur Radio | New Zealand | English | Monthly | 2025–present |
| Amatørradio | Norway | Norwegian | Bimonthly | 1930–present |
| Revista del Radio Club Paraguayo | Paraguay | Spanish | Irregularly | 1953–1986 |
| Boletín ZP | Paraguay | Spanish | Irregularly | 1968–2005 |
| Revista OAX | Peru | Spanish | Monthly | 1925–1928 |
| Boletín OA | Peru | Spanish | Weekly | 1948–present |
| Krótkofalowiec Polski | Poland | Polish | Monthly | 1929–present |
| Świat Radio | Poland | Polish | Bimonthly | 1995–present |
| Radioamator | Poland | Polish | Monthly | 1924–1939 |
| Radioelektronik | Poland | Polish | Monthly | 1950–2010 |
| Revista QTC REP | Portugal | Portuguese | Monthly | 1928–present |
| Boletim Informativo REP | Portugal | Portuguese | Weekly | 1978–present |
| Revista Alta Frequência | Portugal | Portuguese | Bimonthly | 1982–1999 |
| Radio-Român | Romania | Romanian | Weekly | 1925–1928 |
| Radiofonia | Romania | Romanian | Weekly | 1925–1945 |
| Radioamatorul | Romania | Romanian | Monthly | 1950–1958 |
| Tehnium | Romania | Romanian | Monthly | 1971–2006 |
| Radiocomunicații și Radioamatorism | Romania | Romanian | Monthly | 1990–present |
| Radio | Russia | Russian | Monthly | 1924–present |
| Radiomir | Russia | Russian | Monthly | 2001–present |
| Radioconstructor | Russia | Russian | Monthly | 1999–present |
| Radioamater | Serbia | Serbian | Monthly | 1947–2012 |
| Novine RadioAmateri | Serbia | Serbian | Irregularly | 1999–2004 |
| Rádiožurnál SZR | Slovakia | Slovak | Bimonthly | 1993–2005 |
| Rádiožurnál | Slovakia | Czech, Slovak | Bimonthly | 2006–present |
| CQ ZRS | Slovenia | Slovenian | Bimonthly | 1992–present |
| Radioaficionados | Spain | Spanish | Monthly | 1949–present |
| Radio ZS | South Africa | English, Afrikaans | Monthly | 1947–present |
| QTC | South Africa | English | Monthly | 1928–1939 |
| KARL | South Korea | Korean | Monthly | 1955–present |
| QTC Amatörradio | Sweden | Swedish | Monthly | 1927–present |
| Radio & Television | Sweden | Swedish | Monthly | 1929–1983 |
| Old Man | Switzerland | German, French, Italian | Monthly | 1932–2007 |
| HB Radio | Switzerland | German, French, Italian | Bimonthly | 2008–present |
| 100 WATTS | Thailand | Thai, English | Bimonthly | 1988–2019 |
| TRAC Radyo Amatör Mecmuası | Turkey | Turkish | Monthly | 1964–1986 |
| ANTRAK Gazetesi | Turkey | Turkish | Monthly | 1998–present |
| Radioamator | Ukraine | Russian, Ukrainian | Monthly | 1993–2023 |
| Radiohobby | Ukraine | Russian | Bimonthly | 1998–2013 |
| RadCom | United Kingdom | English | Monthly | 1913–present |
| Practical Wireless | United Kingdom | English | Monthly | 1932–present |
| RadCom | United Kingdom | English | Monthly | 1913–present |
| CQ Amateur Radio | United States | English | Monthly | 1945–2023 |
| National Communications Magazine | United States | English | Bimonthly | 1988-present |
| CQ VHF Magazine | United States | English | Quarterly | 1996–2013 |
| Electronics Illustrated | United States | English | Monthly | 1959–1961 |
| ham radio | United States | English | Monthly | 1968–1990 |
| K9YA Telegraph | United States | English | Monthly | 2004–present |
| Modern Electrics | United States | English | Monthly | 1908–1913 |
| National Contest Journal | United States | English | Bimonthly | 1973–present |
| QEX | United States | English | Bimonthly | 1981–present |
| QST | United States | English | Monthly | 1915–present |
| Radio News | United States | English | Monthly | 1917–1971 |
| 73 | United States | English | Monthly | 1960–2003 |
| WorldRadio | United States | English | Monthly | 1971–2008 |
| QRPp | United States | English | Quarterly | 1993-2004 |
| Boletín CX del Radio Club Uruguayo | Uruguay | Spanish | Weekly | 1933-present |
| Uruguay Radiotelefonía | Uruguay | Spanish | Monthly | 1930-1934 |
| Revista Radio Club | Venezuela | Spanish | Monthly | 1934-present |
| Circular Informativa | Venezuela | Spanish | Irregularly | 1934-1992 |
| Informativo RCV | Venezuela | Spanish | Weekly | 1993-present |
| Radio Z2 | Zimbabwe | English | Monthly | 1970-1999 |
