= CQ =

CQ may refer to:

== Arts and entertainment ==
- CQ (film), a 2001 film
- La CQ, a Cartoon Network sitcom
- Cinémathèque québécoise, a Montreal film museum

== People ==
- CQ (playwright) or C. Quintana, a Cuban-American playwright, poet, and writer
- Charles Q. Brown Jr., a retired United States Air Force general.

== Places ==
- Cathedral Quarter, Belfast
- Cathedral Quarter, Derby
- Cathedral Quarter, Sheffield
- Central Queensland (geographical division of Queensland)
- Chongqing, China (Guobiao abbreviation CQ)
- Coal Quay, area in Belfast
- Northern Mariana Islands (FIPS Pub 10-4 or obsolete NATO digram CQ)
- Sark, Channel Islands (ISO 3166-1 alpha-2 exceptionally reserved code CQ for Sark)

== Publications ==
- CQ Amateur Radio
- CQ ham radio
- CQ Press, a US publisher in government and politics
- The China Quarterly, a journal published by Cambridge University Press
- Congressional Quarterly, a US publishing company

== Science and technology ==
- Conjunctive query, in relational databases and database theory
- CQ (call), in radio communications, a general call, to anyone who receives it
- Norinco CQ, a variant of the AR-15 rifle
- Cissus quadrangularis, medicinal plant from the grape family
- Adobe Experience Manager, formerly CQ, a web content management system

== Other uses ==
- Cadit quaestio, Latin for "the question falls", in copy-editing means "has been checked"
- Carrier qualification, qualifications for modern US Navy carrier air operations
- Charge of Quarters, the military task of guarding the front entrance to a barracks
- Communication quotient, in business and organizational psychology
- Constellation Airlines (IATA airline designator CQ)
- Cultural Quotient, in business, education, government and academic research
- Knight of the National Order of Quebec (post-nominal letters CQ)
- Compaq, sometimes abbreviated as CQ
