= CQ magazine =

CQ magazine can refer to several different publications:

- Congressional Quarterly
- CQ Amateur Radio
- CQ ham radio
- The Classical Quarterly
