= Cathedral Quarter =

Cathedral Quarter may refer to

- Cathedral Quarter, Belfast
- Cathedral Quarter, Derby
- Cathedral Quarter, Sheffield
