= I seek you =

"I seek you" is used in telecommunications to request a response:

- CQ (call), two-letter pronunciation used for morse and voice communication
- ICQ, instant messaging protocol named after the phrase

== See also ==
- CQ (disambiguation)
