= Ye Olde Dolphin Inne =

Listed pub in Derby, England

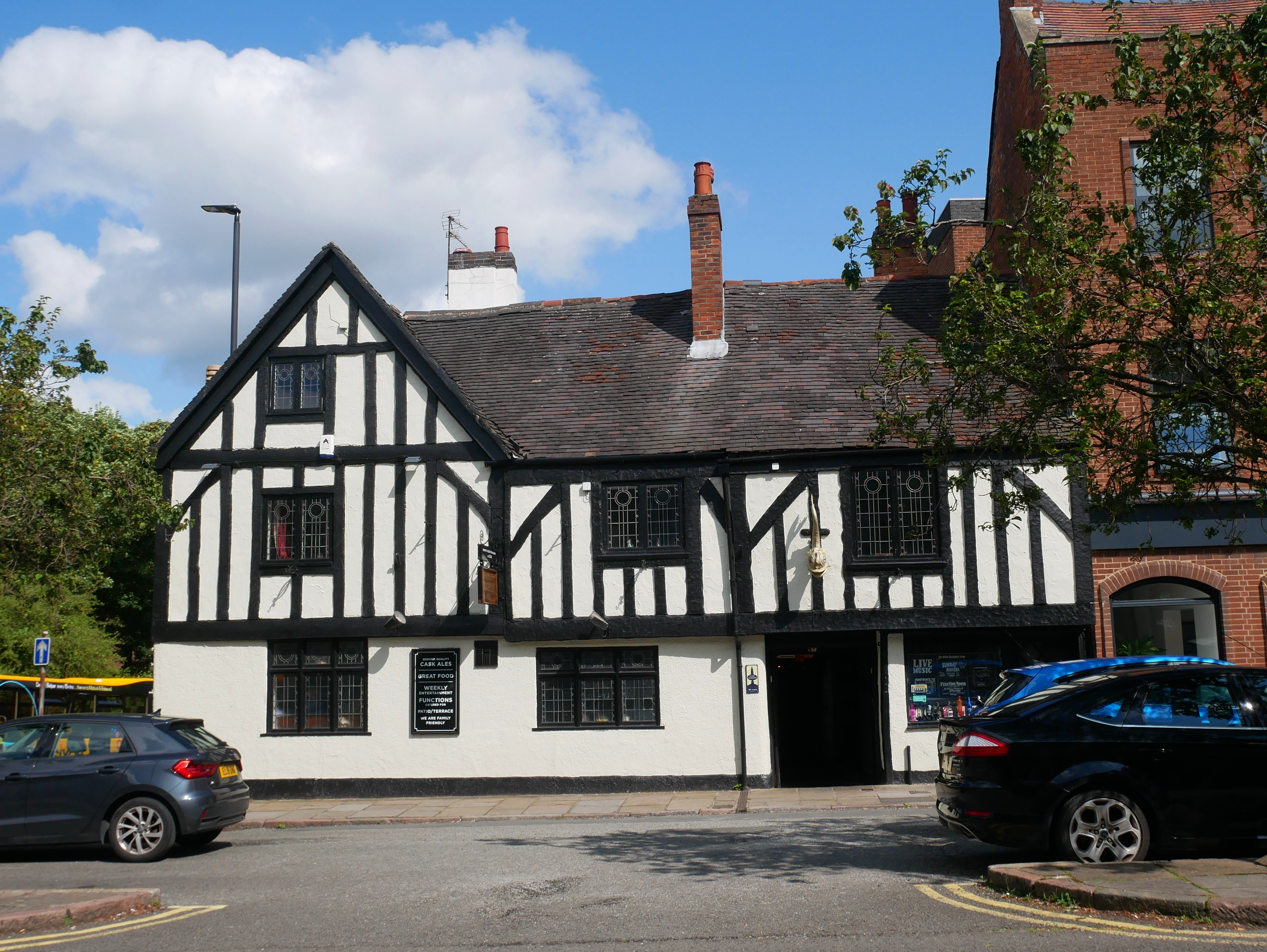
- West face of the pub in 2024
- Alternative names: The Old Dolphin

General information
- Type: Public house; originally a house
- Location: 5A Queen Street, Cathedral Quarter, Derby, England
- Coordinates: 52.925124°N 1.477796°W
- Year built: 16th century
- Renovated: Early 20th century (restored)
- Owner: Stonegate

Design and construction
- Designations

Listed Building – Grade II
- Official name: The Old Dolphin public house
- Designated: 24 February 1977
- Reference no.: 1228932

North face of the pub in 2013

Ye Olde Dolphin Inne is a Grade II listed public house on Queen Street in the Cathedral Quarter area of Derby, England. Traditionally believed to date from 1530, it is regarded as the oldest pub in the city, although the earliest confirmed reference to the building dates from 1618. The timber-framed building was remodelled in the early 20th century. Its interior is included in the Campaign for Real Ale (CAMRA)'s National Inventory of Historic Pub Interiors, where it is rated three stars and recognised as being of "outstanding national historic importance".

== History ==
The public house is regarded as Derby's oldest, with its origins traditionally attributed to 1530 and its licence said to date from 1580, although the earliest confirmed reference to the building is from 1618. It was originally constructed as a timber-framed house, probably during the late 16th century, and follows a traditional domestic layout. Its original purpose is uncertain, and it may have been built as a private residence before becoming an inn, although its prominent position on the main road through the town suggests it could have served as a public house from an early date. The building was extended between approximately 1600 and 1630 with a substantial three-storey range, most of which was demolished in 1928. A further historic range on Full Street was removed in 1953. The external timberwork was renewed in 1912 following the removal of an earlier rendered covering in 1903, which caused the original timbers to deteriorate. The building also underwent significant alterations during the early 20th century. An adjoining extension on Full Street, formerly used as a doctor's house, is associated with the historical practice of dissecting the bodies of executed criminals. The pub's Offilers Lounge takes its name from the local Offilers Brewery, which ceased production in 1966.

On 24 February 1977, the Old Dolphin Inn was designated a Grade II listed building. It was included on the Campaign for Real Ale (CAMRA)'s National Inventory of Historic Pub Interiors before the inventory's grading system was revised. Under the revised scheme, it is rated three stars and its interior is regarded as being "of outstanding national historic importance". As of August 2026, the freehold was owned by Stonegate.

== Architecture ==
=== Exterior ===
The building occupies a corner site and has an L-shaped layout, with a timber-framed structure, rendered exterior and a clay-tiled roof incorporating some older tiles. A passage runs along the right-hand side, formerly serving as a public route, with rooms and staircases arranged off it. The Queen Street frontage accommodates two bar areas, a lounge and a smaller, more intimate seating space, alongside a central bar, while a restaurant is situated on the upper floor. The exterior features a gable end to the left, set at right angles to the street, and a further gable on the adjoining side. The upper floor displays extensive decorative timberwork, introduced during alterations in the early 20th century. The windows, also dating from the 20th century, vary in size and are divided into two, three or four sections.

=== Interior ===
The pub retains a number of notable historic interior features, although much of its present character and arrangement results from an inter-war refurbishment. The four drinking areas are arranged around a central serving counter. The small snug features full-height timber panelling with a decorative painted finish, a partly glazed partition separating it from the serving area, leaded windows and fixed seating. The adjoining lounge retains period furnishings and a substantial inglenook fireplace. The front bar has a red quarry-tiled floor, lower wall panelling with built-in bench seating and a fireplace with brick and timber detailing. Its bar fittings largely date from the inter-war period, although the counter was replaced in the 1980s. The raised lounge, formerly associated with the local Offilers Brewery, retains bell-pushes set into the panelling above the fixed seating, while its fireplace is of more recent date. Some of the fixed seating is thought to incorporate earlier 19th-century elements. The upstairs restaurant is particularly notable for its substantial exposed timber beams dating from the 16th century, together with an old brick fireplace featuring a brass hood.

== See also ==
- Listed buildings in Derby (Arboretum Ward)
