= Ham radio (disambiguation) =

Ham radio or amateur radio is the non-commercial use of the radio spectrum.

Ham Radio may also refer to:

- "Ham Radio" (Frasier), an episode of Frasier
- Ham Radio (magazine), an amateur radio magazine
