= Uska =

Uska or USKA can have several meanings:

In organisations:

- Union Schweizerischer Kurzwellen-Amateure
- The United States Karate Association established by Robert Trias in 1948.

In geography:

- Uska, Uttar Pradesh, India
