= Popular Communications =

American magazine

- September 2010 Issue
- Editor: Richard Fisher, KI6SN
- Emeritus editor: Tom Kneitel (SK)
- Categories: Shortwave Radio
- Frequency: Monthly
- Publisher: CQ Communications
- Founded: 1982
- Final issue: 2013
- Country: United States
- Based in: Hicksville, New York
- Language: English
- Website: www.popular-communications.com
- ISSN: 0733-3315
- OCLC: 8575421

Popular Communications was a magazine with content relating to the radio hobby, including scanners, shortwave radio, CB, amateur radio, AM and FM broadcast band listening, radio history, and vintage radio restoration. The magazine existed between 1982 and 2013. It was based in Hicksville, New York.

== History and profile ==
Popular Communications was first published in 1982, succeeding the CB radio oriented magazine S9, published from 1962 to 1982. The magazine was published by CQ Communications, publishers of CQ Amateur Radio, CQ VHF Magazine, and WorldRadio.

The magazine featured articles covering a broad spectrum of radio topics, regular columns by recognized leaders within the hobby, product reviews, schedules of shortwave stations, and logs of radio communications, including pirate radio, AM, and military aviation transmissions. In addition to these traditional aspects of the radio hobby, the magazine also highlighted more modern facets such as software-defined radio, scanning software, live station streaming, podcasting, and emerging technologies.

In late-December 2013, CQ Communications announced that they would cease publication of the printed version of Popular Communications along with CQ VHF. These two magazines were combined with WorldRadio in a single digital publication to be called CQ Plus starting in February 2014.
