= Radio Society of Great Britain =

British amateur radio organization

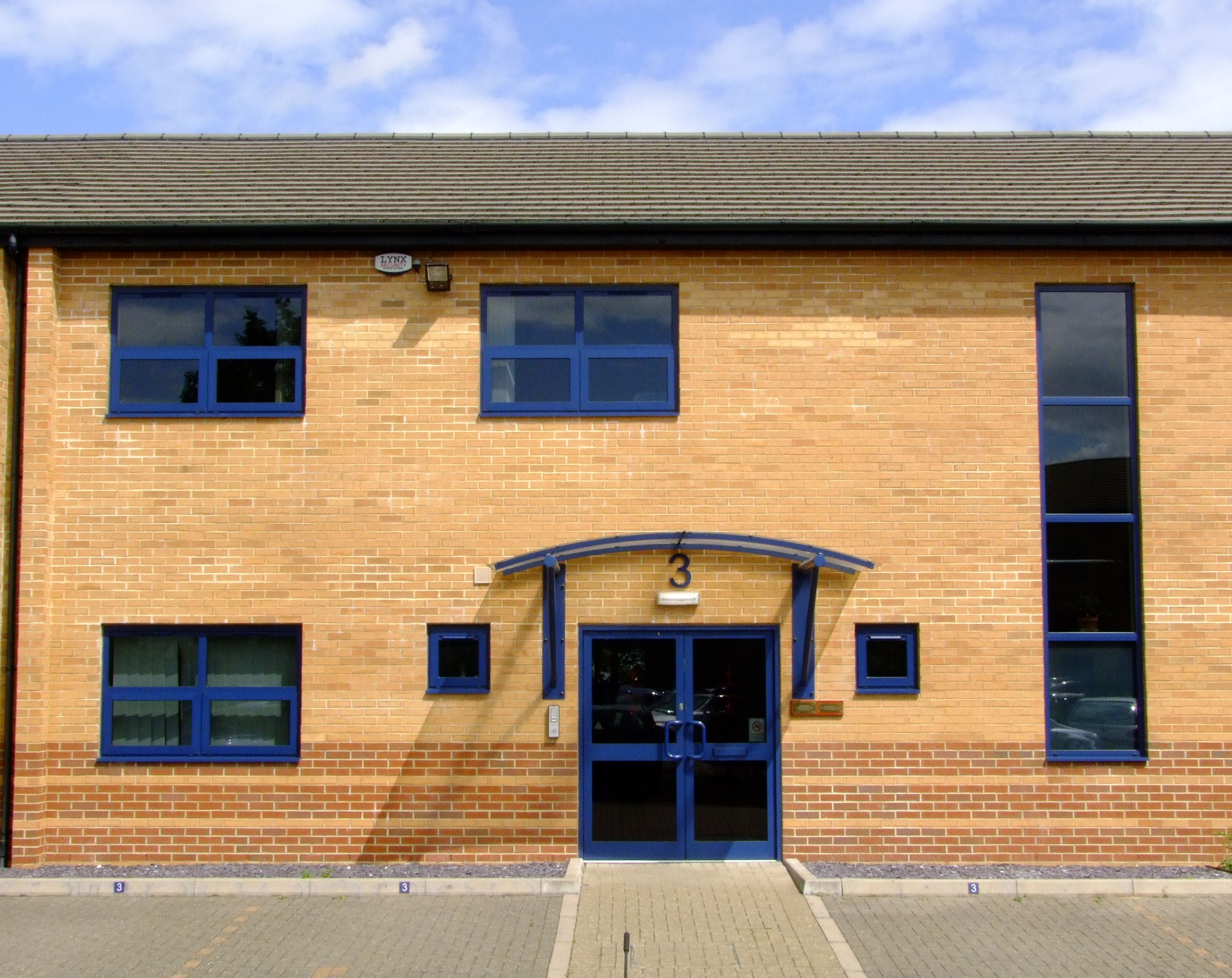
- RSGB headquarters in Bedford, UK, July 2009.
- Abbreviation: RSGB
- Formation: 1913
- Type: Company Limited by Guarantee, registered in England and Wales
- Headquarters: 3 Abbey Court, Fraser Road, Priory Business Park, Bedford MK44 3WH; IO92sd
- Region served: UK
- Members: 21,200
- President: Bob Beebe, GU4YOX
- Main organ: board of directors
- Affiliations: International Amateur Radio Union
- Website: http://www.rsgb.org/

The Radio Society of Great Britain (RSGB) is the United Kingdom's recognised national society for amateur radio operators. The society was founded in 1913 as the London Wireless Club, making it one of the oldest organisations of its kind in the world. Through its work, it represents the interests of the UK's 80,000 licensed radio amateurs in the United Kingdom and certain dependent territories of the United Kingdom at the International Amateur Radio Union, acting as a medium for communication between the licensed operators and the UK government.

== Role ==
The RSGB has traditionally acted as the organisation through which its members interact with the telecommunications regulatory authority of the United Kingdom, Ofcom. Although Ofcom has used its web site to solicit opinions directly from all amateur radio enthusiasts and other interested parties, the RSGB continues to advise and to seek to influence Ofcom on the likely impact of proposed changes in many areas – from decisions on spectrum and licensing, through to interference arising from intruders or from spurious emissions from electronic equipment such as Solar Panels, VDSL or PLT. Its advice on EMC issues is one of many services to its members and the wider amateur community.

RSGB also acts as a parent organisation to many smaller groups and societies which affiliate to it. Some of these societies form in towns or unite local areas (such as repeater groups). Other specialist groups can include contesters, a particular operating category, or even people interested in a particular amateur radio band (such as 6-meter band groups).

The society publishes a monthly magazine called RadCom, along with a range of technical books.

== History ==
The roots of the Radio Society of Great Britain can traced back to the formation of the London Wireless Club, inaugurated in West Hampstead on 5 July 1913. The first President was Alan Archibald Campbell-Swinton who was succeeded in 1920 by James Robert Erskine-Murray.

At its first meeting in September 1913, it was decided that the name should change from the London Wireless Club to the Wireless Society of London. In November 1922, the name of the Society was changed to that it holds to this day, the substitution of the term 'Great Britain' for 'London' being made with the view to extend the perceived scope of the Society's work.

The RSGB made the first radio transmission across to the United States, but failed to have any receiving equipment. Many members were slightly annoyed by this fact and so formed other sections of the RSGB which were later absorbed into the RSGB itself.

During World War II, the entire RSGB Council and many of its members were recruited into MI8, also known as the Radio Security Service. Its mission was to intercept clandestine enemy transmissions.

In 2006, the RSGB cooperated with Ofcom to revise the amateur radio licence in the United Kingdom; following the formal consultation process, from 8 February 2007 the Wireless Telegraphy Act 1949 was replaced by the Wireless Telegraphy Act 2006. Changes included removing the annual licence fee and removing the requirement to log all transmissions. Amateur radio operators gained permission to operate one's amateur radio station remotely, and the changes increased the spectrum available to the lower classes of licensees.

=== 2011 expenses scandal ===
On 28 March 2011, the Board announced that the RSGB's general manager had left the Society's employment after the discovery of financial irregularities, allegedly for the amount of £41,000. RSGB Director, Don Beattie G3BJ, acted as general manager until the appointment of a new general manager, Graham Coomber G0NBI, in May 2012.

The following notice appeared on the RSGB website on 16 October 2013:

The Board is pleased to be able to report to Members that the debt owed to the Society by its previous General Manager, who left the Society in early 2011, has been repaid in full, together with statutory interest and the Society’s court fees. This will be reflected in the 2013 accounts as a write-back of the provision taken against the debt in the 2011 accounts. Details will be in the annual report and accounts which will be published in time for the AGM in 2014. The Board expresses its thanks to the Society team which has brought about the recovery of this debt and now regards the matter as closed. No further comment will be made.

=== RSGB Centenary 2013 ===
In 2013 the RSGB celebrated its centenary with a programme of events including a special callsign G100RSGB, the RSGB Centenary Award 2013 and a construction competition. The special callsign G100RSGB travelled around the 13 RSGB regions and was operated by groups in each area.

== National Radio Centre ==
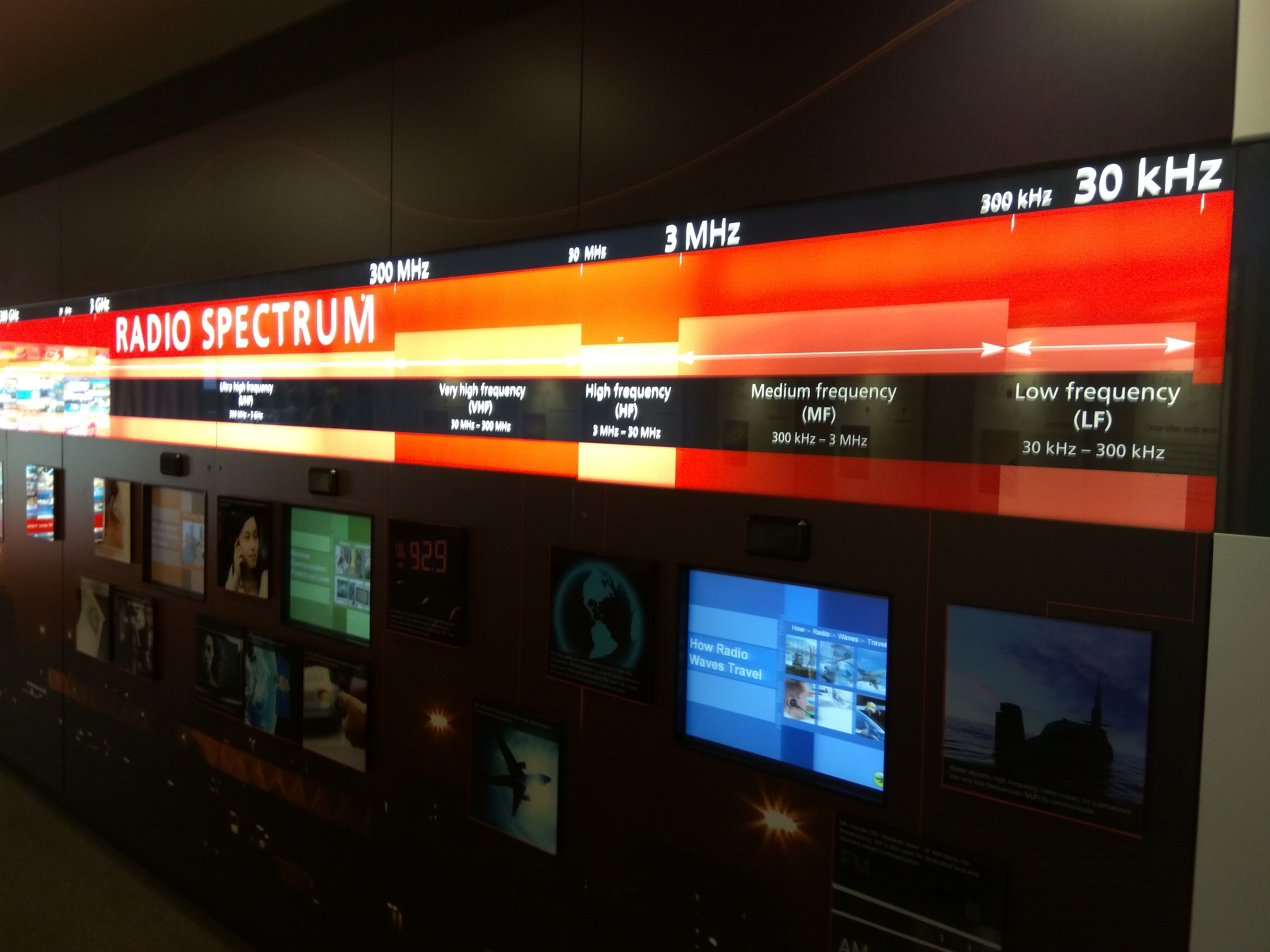
Exhibition at RSGB National Radio Centre, informing, how radio portion of electromagnetic spectrum is currently allocated and utilised on specific frequency bands

The RSGB National Radio Centre at Bletchley Park in Buckinghamshire opened in 2012. It has exhibits and demonstrations of wireless technology, the GB3RS radio station, and the RSGB archives in a newly constructed building close to the main Bletchley Park entrance. The centre has proven increasingly popular with visitor numbers rising from 26,000 in 2017, to over 90,000 in 2019.

== Future ==
There are competing demands from more and more non-amateur uses of radio (for example mobile operators and wireless devices). Despite this, the RSGB has been able to maintain existing amateur radio allocations and negotiate some new ones.

== Outreach to younger amateurs ==
With the formation of the Youth Team (Formerly RSGB Youth Committee) the society is catering for the demands of the younger licensees. In 2014, The society took part in the International Amateur Radio Union's Youngsters on the Air (YOTA) event in Finland, whilst completing a mini YOTA event in the UK. The RSGB hosted YOTA in the UK in 2017, attracting over 80 young people from all over the world to the UK to take part in radio related events. This event was organised by senior members of the RSGB with support from the youth committee. The Youth Committee was Chaired from its formation in 2014 to 2018 by Mike Jones, M5PMJ, acting as the Youth Coordinator for the UK for the International Amateur Radio Union. The society had remained an active part in the YOTA programme, being represented in 2018 in South Africa and engaging in December YOTA Months.

== Publications ==
The RSGB publishes many books on amateur radio and related matters, including:

- Brown, Chris (ed) (2001) Radio & Electronics Cookbook Radio Society of Great Britain. ISBN 0-7506-5214-4
- Dennison, Mike and Lorek, Chris, eds. (2006). RSGB Radio Communication Handbook. 8th Edition. Radio Society of Great Britain. ISBN 978-1-905086-74-0.
- Dodd, Peter (1996) Antenna Experimenter's Guide, The Radio Society of Great Britain. ISBN 1-872309-36-4
- Fielding, John (2006) Power Supply Handbook Radio Society of Great Britain. ISBN 1-905086-21-0
- Fielding, John (2006) Amateur Radio Astronomy Radio Society of Great Britain. ISBN 1-905086-16-4
- Hawker, Pat (2002) Antenna Topics Radio Society of Great Britain. ISBN 1-872309-89-5
- Poole, Ian (2004) Radio Propagation—Principles & Practice Radio Society of Great Britain. ISBN 1-872309-97-6
- Read, Giles (2010) HF Antennas for everyone Radio Society of Great Britain. ISBN 978-1-905086-59-7

=== RadCom ===
RadCom (formerly "Radio Communication", and even earlier "The Bulletin") is the official journal of the Radio Society of Great Britain, and is posted free monthly to all RSGB members. There are two other online publications:

- RadCom Basics, for Members new to the hobby or to refresh their knowledge.
- RadCom Plus, a more technical supplement with more advanced topics and projects

== Patrons ==
The Radio Society of Great Britain has had a Royal Family Member as their patron for many years. These include:

- HRH Duke of Edinburgh 1952 – 9 April 2021.

== See also ==
- Radio Amateurs Emergency Network (RAYNET), a UK service provided by amateur radio operators
