= Ham Radio (magazine) =

1967–1990 amateur radio magazine

- Categories: Amateur radio
- Frequency: Monthly
- Founded: 1967
- First issue: November 1967
- Final issue Number: June 1990; 268
- Country: United States
- Based in: Greenville, New Hampshire
- Language: English

Ham Radio (HR) was a monthly amateur radio enthusiast magazine published in the United States from November 1967 to June 1990.

== History and profile ==
Ham Radio was founded in 1967. The first issue appeared in November 1967. The editor was Jim Fisk W1DTY, who had previously edited 73 Magazine. The publisher was Thorvald "Skip" Tenney. It was based in Greenville, NH.

At the 1990 Dayton Hamvention, it was announced that Ham Radio had been sold to the publishers of CQ Amateur Radio. The magazine published a newsletter, HR Report, founded by Joseph J. Schroeder Jr. The June 1990 issue of Ham Radio was the 268th and final issue published where subscribers were told of the sale and that they would receive CQ in the future.

The magazine was published in English and drew its subscription base primarily from the United States of America and Canada.

Ham Radio Horizons Magazine was a VHF and newcomer emphasis magazine printed by the same publisher as Ham Radio Magazine. It existed from March 1977 to 1981, with the last 7 issues that were incorporated into Ham Radio Magazine in 1981.

== See also ==
- List of amateur radio magazines
