= James Robert Erskine-Murray =

Scottish electrical engineer and inventor (1868–1927)

Dr James Robert Erskine-Murray FRSE MIEE (1868-1927) was a Scottish electrical engineer and inventor. A protege of Lord Kelvin, he also worked with Marconi and was a pioneer in the development of the telegraph. He wrote extensively on telegraphy and wireless communication.

== Early life ==
He was born in Edinburgh on 24 October 1868, the eldest son of Alexander Erskine Erskine-Murray [sic], Sheriff of Glasgow (1832-1907), and his wife, Helen Pringle, daughter of Robert Pringle of Symington. In 1886 he began study under Lord Kelvin at Glasgow University assisting Kelvin in electrical experiments from 1888 and graduating BSc in 1892.

== Career ==
He began lecturing in electricity at Heriot-Watt College in Edinburgh in 1896. In 1897 he was elected a Fellow of the Royal Society of Edinburgh. His proposers were Lord Kelvin, John Gray McKendrick, William Jack and Joseph Bell. He received a doctorate (DSc) in 1897 and in 1898 he became personal assistant to Guglielmo Marconi based at the Haven Hotel near Poole (often called The Haven Experimental Station). Here he was involved in Marconi's critical experiments regarding submarine telegraph cables. In 1899 he was moved to Marconi's Hall Street Factory in Chelmsford. Later in 1900 he began lecturing in physics and electrical engineering at University College, Nottingham. In 1905 he transferred to George Coats Technical College in Paisley.

In 1913 he was elected vice president of the London Wireless Society, later renamed the Radio Society of Great Britain. In the same year he was joint founder of Clark, Forde, Taylor and Erskine-Murray. During the First World War he was attached to the Royal air Force with the rank of lieutenant commander, being placed in charge of wireless instruments and radio communications. In 1918 this evolved into the Wireless Experimental Establishment at Biggin Hill. In this year he took out a patent on electric vacuous bulb thermionic devices. In 1920 he succeeded Alan Archibald Campbell-Swinton as president of the London Wireless Society. Through the 1920s he was the experimental engineer at the Royal Navy Barracks at Portsmouth. In 1922 he created an electronic device which acted as a navigation aid, a forerunner of the global positioning system.

== Personal life ==
In 1899 he married Alleine Frederica Florinda Gildea, daughter of Major General G F Gildea. He died in Portsmouth on 12 February 1927. Their only son, James Alistair Frederick Campbell Erskine-Murray (1902-1973) succeeded to the title 13th Lord Elibank in 1962 upon the death of an uncle.

== Publications ==
- Forces Between Currents (1891)
- Some Experiments on the Viscosity of Air (1891)
- On the Temperature Variation of the Thermal Conductivity of Rocks (1895) with Kelvin
- On the Effect of the Rontgen X-Rays (1896)
- On Volta Electricity of Metals (1898)
- On Contact Electricity of Metals (1898)
- A Differentiating Machine (1904)
- A Handbook of Wireless Telegraphy (1907 onwards)
- Wireless Telephones and How They Work (1910 onwards)
- Wireless Communication Over Sea (1912)
