= WorldRadio =

- Front cover of August 2010 issue
- Editor: Richard Fisher, KI6SN
- Categories: Amateur radio
- Frequency: Monthly
- Publisher: CQ Communications
- First issue: July 1971
- Final issue: January 2009
- Country: USA
- Based in: Sacramento, CA
- Language: English

Worldradio was a monthly amateur radio enthusiast magazine published in Sacramento, CA, United States from July 1971 to January 2009. The magazine was published in English and drew its subscription base primarily from the United States and Canada, although it had subscribers around the world. The staff of the magazine had an Amateur Radio club that was assigned the call sign WR6WR. This magazine is unrelated to a magazine called "World-Radio" published in the United Kingdom before World War II.

== Sale to CQ Communications, Inc. ==
On November 12, 2008, CQ Communications, publishers of CQ Amateur Radio, CQ VHF Magazine and Popular Communications announced that they had purchased Worldradio magazine from the founder and publisher Armond Noble, N6WR. Paid subscriptions for Worldradio were turned into CQ Amateur Radio subscriptions, while WorldRadio was continued as an on-line magazine. The first online issue, renamed WorldRadio Online, was published in February 2009.
