= CQ VHF Magazine =

USA amateur radio magazine

- Summer 2010 Issue
- Editor: Joe Lynch, N6CL
- Categories: Amateur radio
- Frequency: Quarterly
- Publisher: CQ Communications, Inc.
- Founded: 1996
- Final issue: 2013
- Country: United States
- Based in: Hicksville, New York
- Language: English
- ISSN: 1085-0708

CQ VHF was a magazine that served the ham radio operators whose operational and technical interests lie above 50 MHz.

The magazine focused on radio technology, products, and activities that exist on 6 meters, 2 meters, 440 MHz and above. CQ VHF covered a broad range of skill levels, from the new Technician to the Extra Class microwave experimenter, and included operating, technical and construction articles.

CQ VHF was published by CQ Communications, publishers of CQ Amateur Radio magazine, WorldRadio magazine, and Popular Communications magazine.

In late December 2013 CQ Communications announced that they would cease publication of the printed version of CQ VHF Magazine and Popular Communications. These two magazines were combined with WorldRadio in a single digital publication called CQ Plus starting in February 2014.
