= RadCom =

UK magazine

- Typical RadCom cover
- Categories: Amateur radio
- Frequency: Monthly
- Publisher: Radio Society of Great Britain
- Founded: 1913
- Country: United Kingdom
- Language: English
- Website: www.rsgb.org.uk/news/radcom/
- ISSN: 1367-1499

RadCom is the monthly magazine published by the Radio Society of Great Britain and is provided to all corporate members of the society. Typically 100 pages, it includes a mixture of news, theory, construction and technical articles of interest to the amateur radio community.

== History ==
From its inception in 1913 until the end of 1924, the official journal of the Radio Society of Great Britain was the independent publication Wireless World and Radio Review. Due to a change in proprietorship of that magazine, the honour was withdrawn and bestowed instead on Experimental Wireless and the Wireless Engineer. In July 1925, it was decided by members of the Society's Transmitting and Receiving (T & R) Section to produce its own monthly publication "written by and for the radio amateur". This was entitled T & R Bulletin. The magazine changed its name to RSGB Bulletin in July 1942. In 1968, the name changed again to Radio Communication, which was abbreviated to RadCom in January 1995.

== Content and coverage ==
As the house journal of the Radio Society of Great Britain, RadCom covers all matters directly related to the society. The remaining pages are devoted to a number of regular columns covering topics such as low frequency, amateur television, VHF/UHF, electromagnetic compatibility, radio propagation, contesting, and many other subjects. There are two or three in-depth technical articles per month, plus reviews of new equipment and other features which relate to amateur radio as a whole.

Most of the technical content is provided by RSGB members and invited authors. The society actively solicits technical articles for publication, which are then subject to independent scrutiny by the RSGB Technical Committee. On approval, articles are passed to the Editorial Department for editing prior to insertion into the magazine.
