= Communication quotient =

Theory on communication as a skill

Communication quotient (CQ; alternately called communication intelligence or CI) is the theory that communication is a behavior-based skill that can be measured and trained. CQ measures the ability of people to communicate effectively with one another. In 1999 Mario de Vries was the first to present a theory on CQ measurement. The first scholarly article referring to CQ was "CQ: the Communication Quotient for IS professionals" by Robert Service.

== History ==
The development of CQ began with challenges to the idea that IQ fully explained cognitive ability. In 1983 Howard Gardner published Frames of Mind: The Theory of Multiple Intelligences. Gardner claimed that IQ failed to fully explain cognitive ability. CQ is one of Gardner's "intelligences". Daniel Goleman's emotional intelligence and social intelligence are others. As explained by De Vries: one measure of intelligence is to be able to explain an insight, whether it is analytical or emotional. Hence, CQ is required to activate IQ and EQ.

== Definitions ==
The Times of India in 2005, in "A Shift from IQ", referred to CQ as an ability multi-national corporations were seeking among Indian graduates. In 2005 Craig Harrison in Improving Your Communication Quotient described CQ skills specifically in terms of workplace communication. In 2007 Clare Munn defined CQ as "Expressive & Receptive Intelligence" the communication bridge between IQ and EQ. In 2011 Alistair Gordon and Steve Kimmens in The CQ Manifesto defined CQ as "saying the right thing in the right way to the right people at the right time in a such a way that the message is received and understood as it was intended".

Robert Service presented CQ as a measurable and improvable type of intelligence, specifically for IT and IS professionals. Service argued that the improvement of communication skills allows individuals promotion opportunities. The article presents two models to explain communication:

- a model of two-way communications
- CQ measurement and improvement matrix.

In 2020 de Vries finished research into the distinctive factors of communication at HAN University of Applied Sciences in Arnhem. He concluded that all communication models are mere frameworks than models, because they lack measurement. Furthermore these frameworks are only visualisations of information flows. De Vries defined more than forty communication competences in seven different layers. The result is a proven system for measuring CQ. De Vries claimed that communication competences are different from communications skills, such as presentation skills. (Ai says this about the difference: Skills are specific, teachable abilities used to perform tasks, while competencies are broader sets of skills, knowledge, and behaviours that enable someone to be successful in a role. Skills are more concrete and task-oriented, while competencies are more holistic and encompass multiple skills within a larger context. Skill: Knowing how to use Microsoft Excel. Competency: Data analysis, which might involve using Excel, but also interpreting data, drawing conclusions, and communicating findings).

Skills can be trained, while competences require a learning program. In a training program one learns an ability to do something by repeatedly doing it and this way learning to become better at it, like a presentation skill. In a learning program one builds knowledge and insights about multiple interrelated and interacting elements of a skill in a structured way. In simple words: carpentry is a skill; building a house is a competence. De Vries defines CQ as "the competence and creativity to communicate content in the context of the consumer to maximise the capacity of that information".

== See also ==
- Intelligence quotient
- Emotional intelligence
- Theory of multiple intelligences
