= K9YA Telegraph =

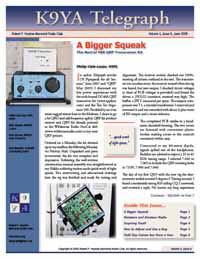
- K9YA Telegraph, June 2008
- Editor: Philip Cala-Lazar, K9PL
- Categories: Amateur radio
- Frequency: Monthly
- Publisher: Robert F. Heytow Memorial Radio Club
- First issue: January 2004
- Country: USA
- Based in: Skokie, Illinois
- Language: English
- Website: www.k9ya.org
- ISSN: 2472-2340

The K9YA Telegraph is a free, monthly, general interest amateur radio e-zine first published in January 2004. The journal of the Robert F. Heytow Memorial Radio Club, the K9YA Telegraph is distributed to subscribers in over 100 countries via e-mail as a PDF file. Issues comprise original articles written by authors drawn from its subscriber base. Notable among those authors was contributing editor, Rod Newkirk (SK), W9BRD/VA3ZBB, former "How's DX" columnist for QST magazine; Wayne Green (SK), W2NSD, legendary publisher of 73 and other popular electronic hobbyist magazines; and Don Keith, N4KC, best-selling and award-winning author.

The K9YA Telegraph offers the amateur radio community a no-cost publication covering a number of topics unavailable elsewhere and in providing a venue and readership to first-time writers.

The Telegraph's staff includes: Michael Dinelli, N9BOR, layout; Philip Cala-Lazar, K9PL, editor; and Jeff Murray, K1NSS, cartoonist.

Cartoons of K9YA Telegraph cartoonist emeritus (as of April 2016) Dick Sylvan (SK), W9CBT, appear in NAQCC News, the newsletter of the North American QRP CW Club. A collection of Dick's cartoons is reproduced in the book, HI HI—A Collection of Ham Radio Cartoons (ISBN 9781411661950).

A compilation of Rod Newkirk's articles written for the K9YA Telegraph is published in the book, The Rod Newkirk Collection: From the Pages of the K9YA Telegraph 2004 - 2009 (ISBN 978-1-4583-6939-0).

K9YA Telegraph articles have been referenced and reprinted in a number of publications, websites and institutions including the scientific journal, Polar Research, Volume 27, Issue 1, April 2008; QRP Labs, https://qrp-labs.com/images/qcx/K9YA.pdf; OT News, The Journal of The Radio Amateur Old Timers Association (UK), Autumn 2021, Autumn 2026; Proceedings, Fall 2021, Radio Club of America; Four State QRP Group, https://www.4sqrp.com/kits/ozarkpatrol/ozarkpatrolreview.pdf, https://www.4sqrp.com/kits/filter/k9yatelegraphfeb2013hpm.pdf; NFARL eNews, August 2018, North Fulton Amateur Radio League; the exchange, Vol. 5, No. 2, 11/2021, SouthWest Ohio DX Association; Yavapai Signal, March 2015, Yavapai Amateur Radio Club, W7YRC; e-Ham.net, https://www.eham.net/reviews/view-product/5735; ARCI NEWS, Vol. 27, Issue 6, December 2007, Antique Radio Club of Illinois; Contester's Rate Sheet, a publication of the American Radio Relay League; The Keynote, the journal of the International Morse Preservation Society (FISTS); Carbonear Heritage Society, Carbonear, Newfoundland.

In April 2013 the staff of the K9YA Telegraph released their fully revised fifth edition of the book, The Art & Skill of Radio-Telegraphy (ISBN 978-1-300-60870-7) by William Pierpont, NØHFF.

K9YA Telegraph motto: The Good News About Amateur Radio
