= Cathedral Quarter, Sheffield =

City centre quarter in Sheffield, England

Coordinates: 53.3825°N 1.4695°W

The Cathedral Quarter is one of Sheffield's city centre quarters, located around and named after the Cathedral. It is bound by Tenter Street to the northwest, West Bar to the north, Snig Hill to the north east, Angel Street to the east, High Street and Church Street to the south and Townhead Street around its western corner.

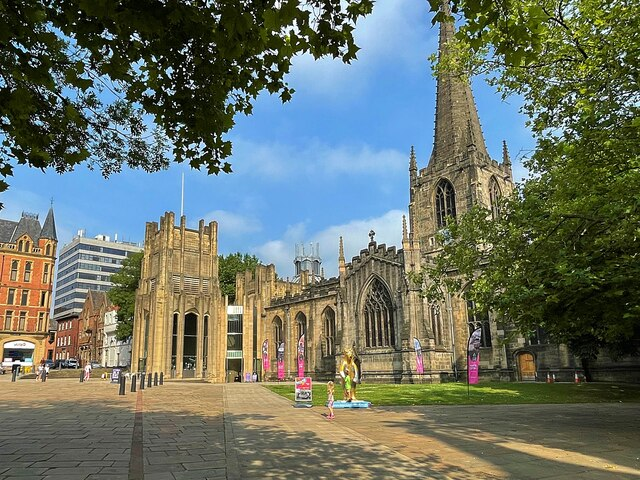
Sheffield Cathedral

The quarter is an office and retail location, containing the Church Street shops and is the regional centre of the former Midland Bank (now HSBC) in the Pennine Centre, on the South side of Tenter Street and also contains the St James' Tower.

== Architecture ==
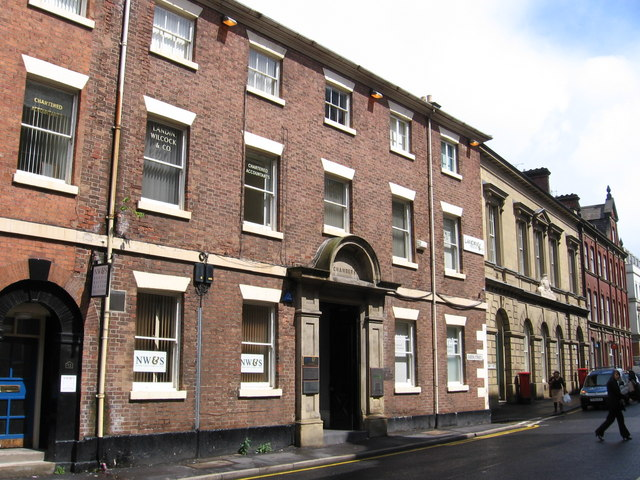
Queen Street Chambers

The area features the highest density of Georgian buildings anywhere in the city, with Paradise Square sat in its heart.

== Transport ==
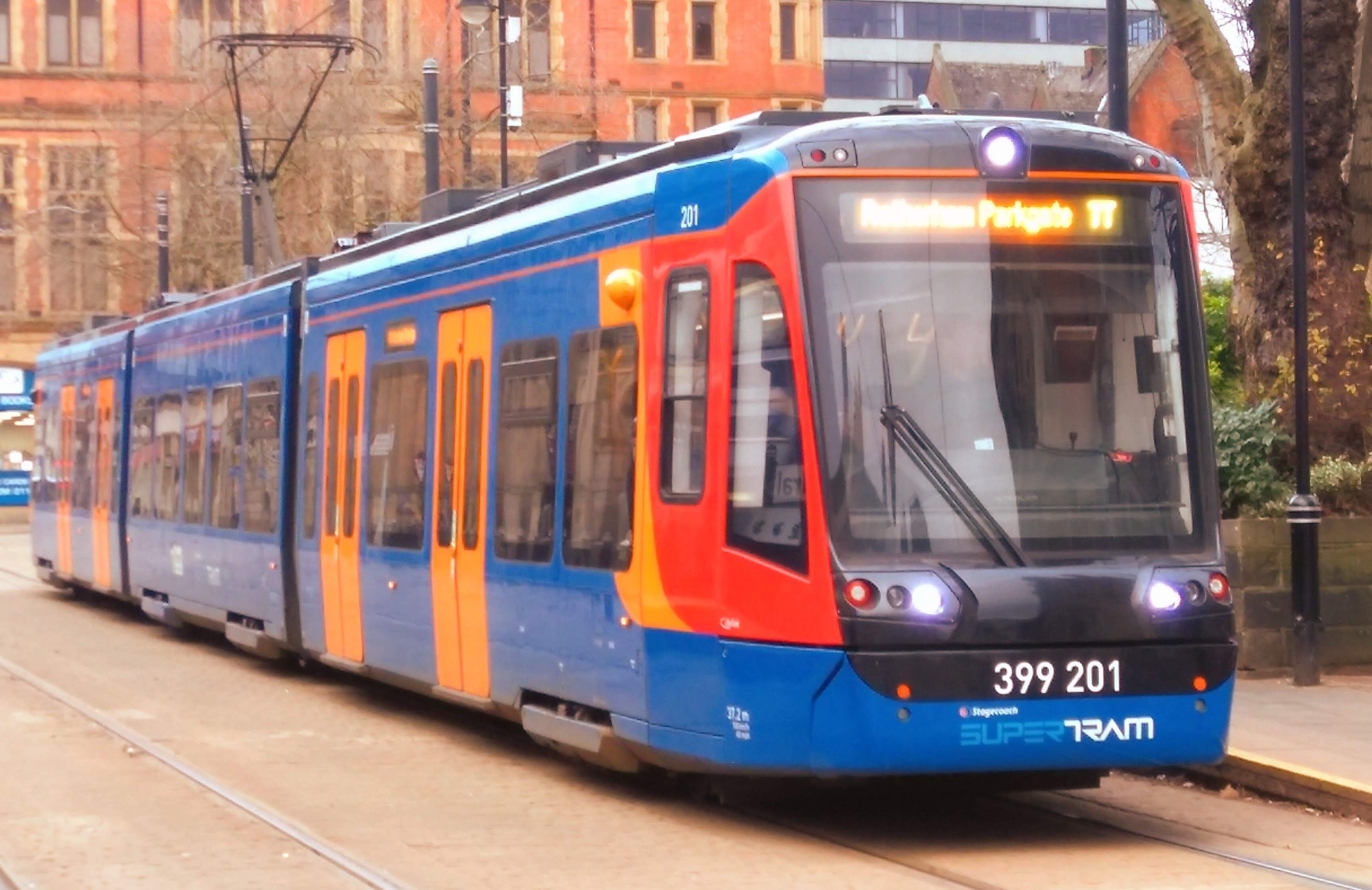
Class 399 at Cathedral tram stop

The Cathedral Quarter is served by the Sheffield Supertram via the Cathedral stop on all lines. It also acts as the terminus of the City Link Tram Train to Rotherham.
