= Pennine Five =

Pennine Five (P5)
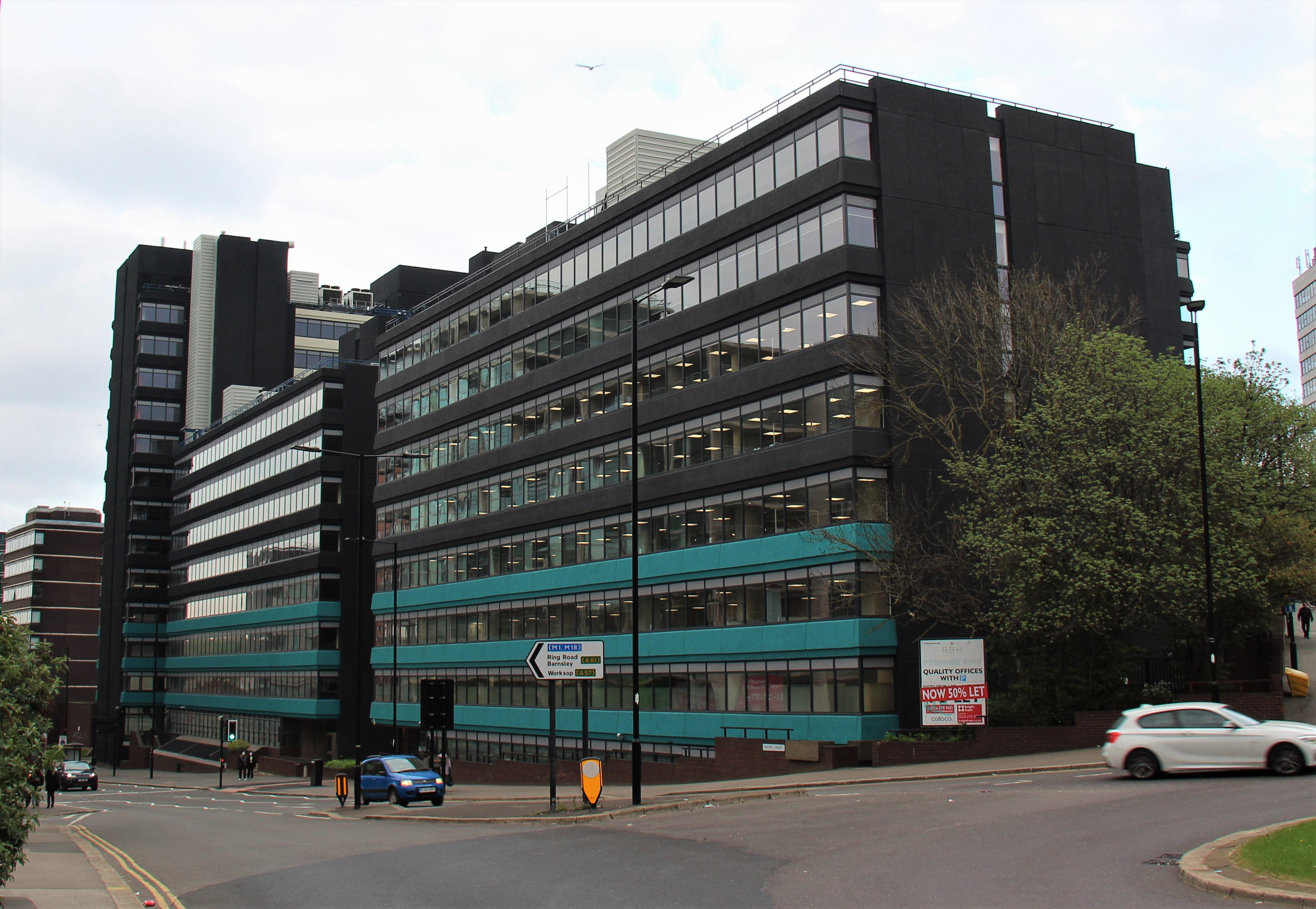
- Pennine Five after refurbishment in 2022
- Interactive map of the Pennine Five (P5) area

General information
- Status: Completed
- Type: Offices
- Location: Sheffield, England
- Coordinates: 53.3839°N 1.4727°W
- Construction started: 1973
- Completed: 1975
- Opening: 24 January 1976

Height
- Roof: 50 m (164 ft)
- Top floor: 50 m (164 ft)

Technical details
- Floor count: 13

Other information
- Public transit access: B Y City Hall

Pennine Five (P5), known as the Pennine Centre prior to 2020, is a tower on Tenter Street in Sheffield, England. Construction started in 1973 on this immense building and was completed in 1975.

The tower is 50 m (164 ft) tall and has 13 floors of office space. It was built in the International style, like the Arts Tower in Sheffield and Tower 42 in London.

The Pennine Centre was built for HSBC and used as their regional headquarters. HSBC moved to a new-build regional headquarters at Charter Square on the other side of the city centre in 2019. The unoccupied building was subsequently purchased by RBH Properties for £18 million, who then carried out a £30 million refurbishment of the complex, rebranding it as Pennine Five or P5. The first phase of the refurbished project, codenamed Block Three, reopened for commercial use in June 2020.

== Gallery ==
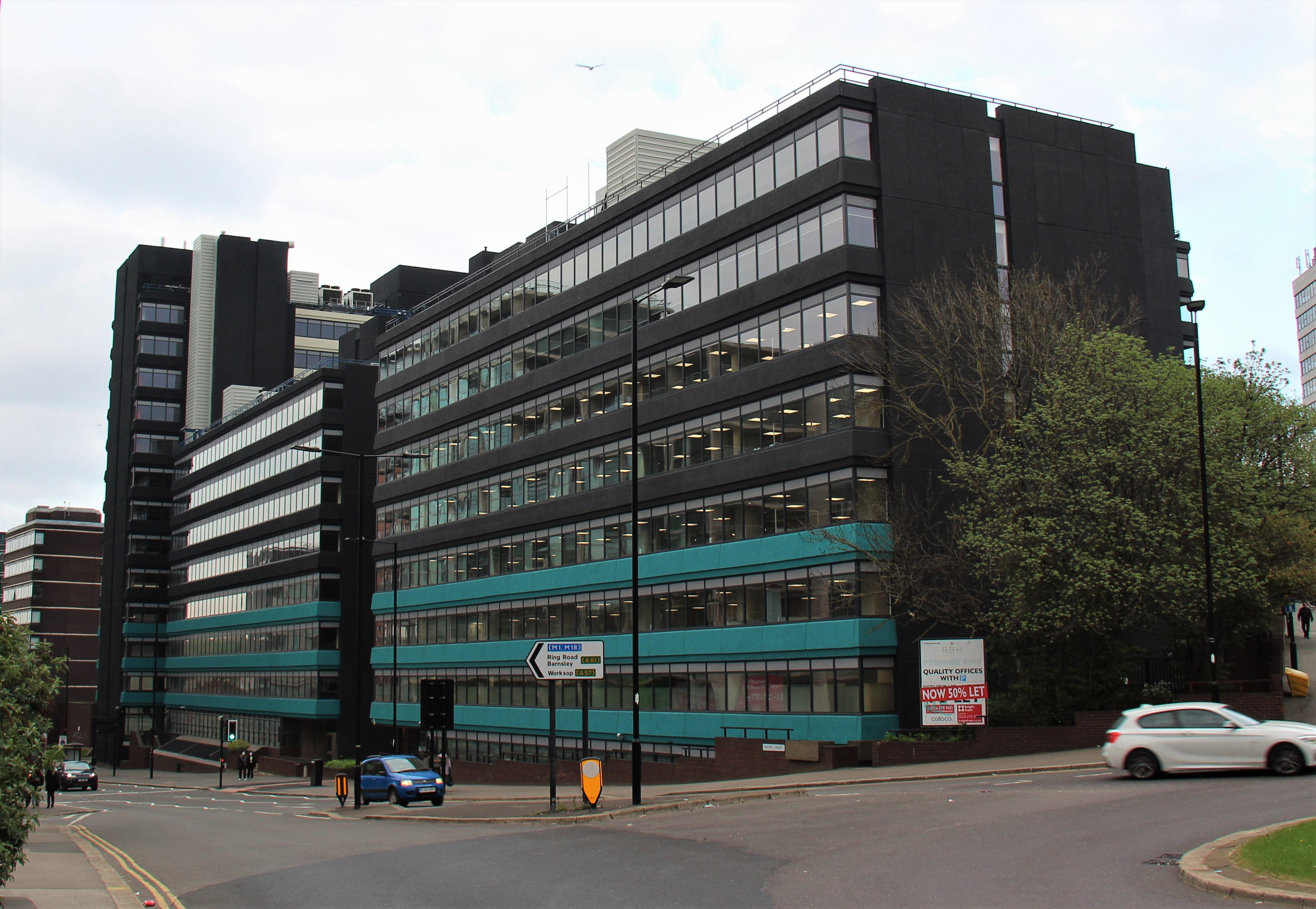

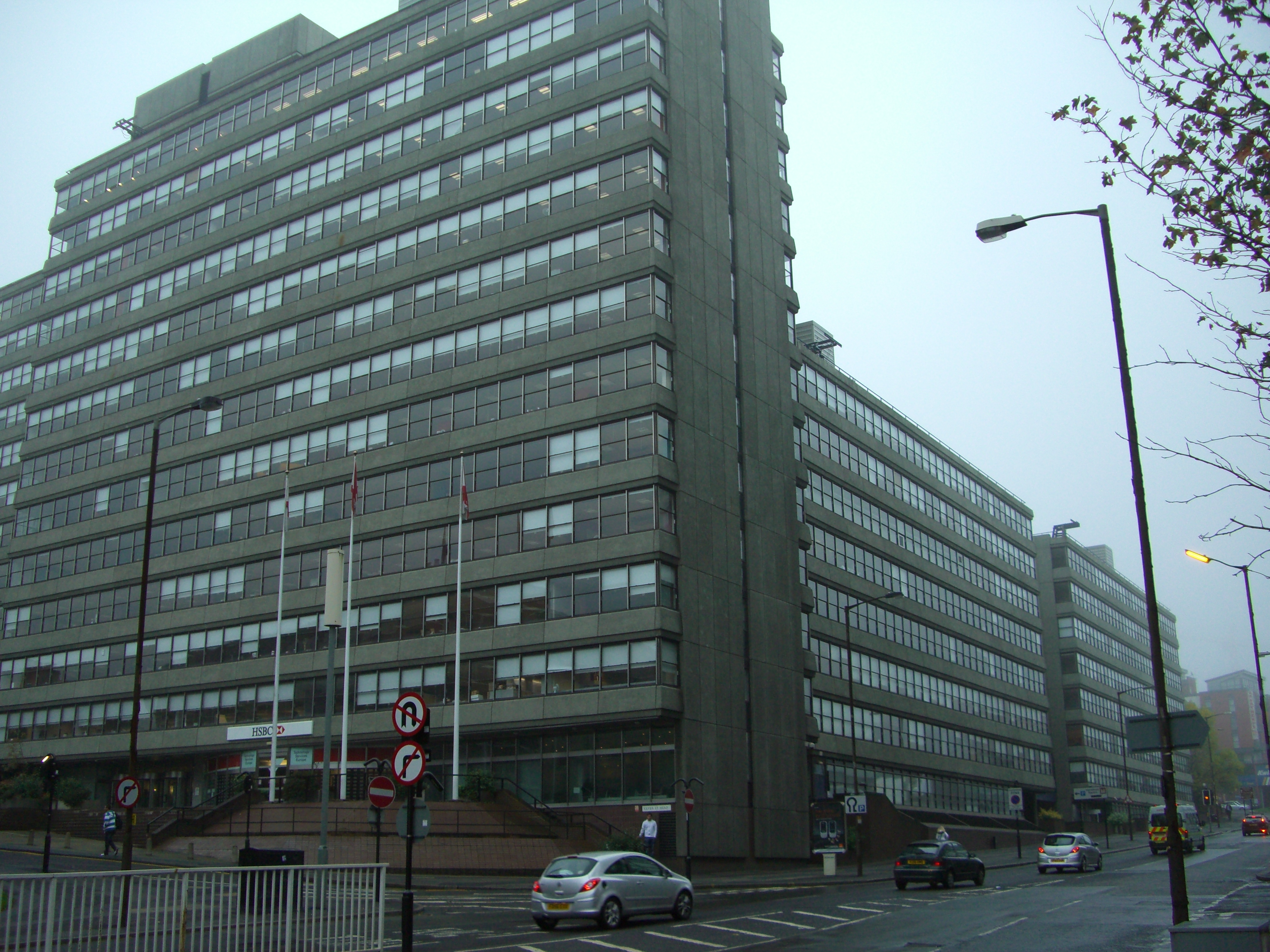

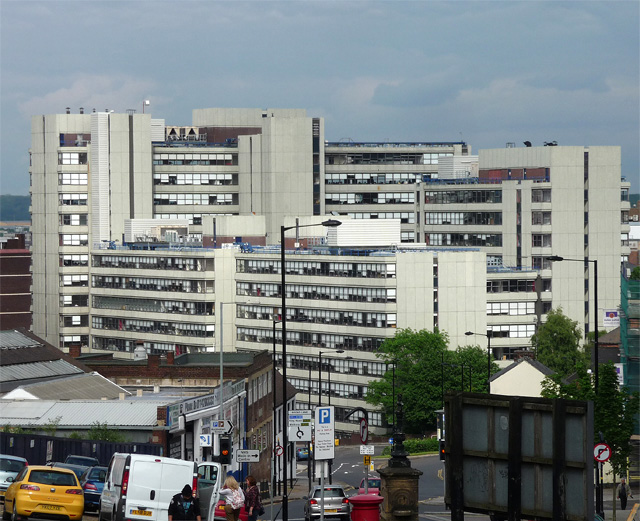

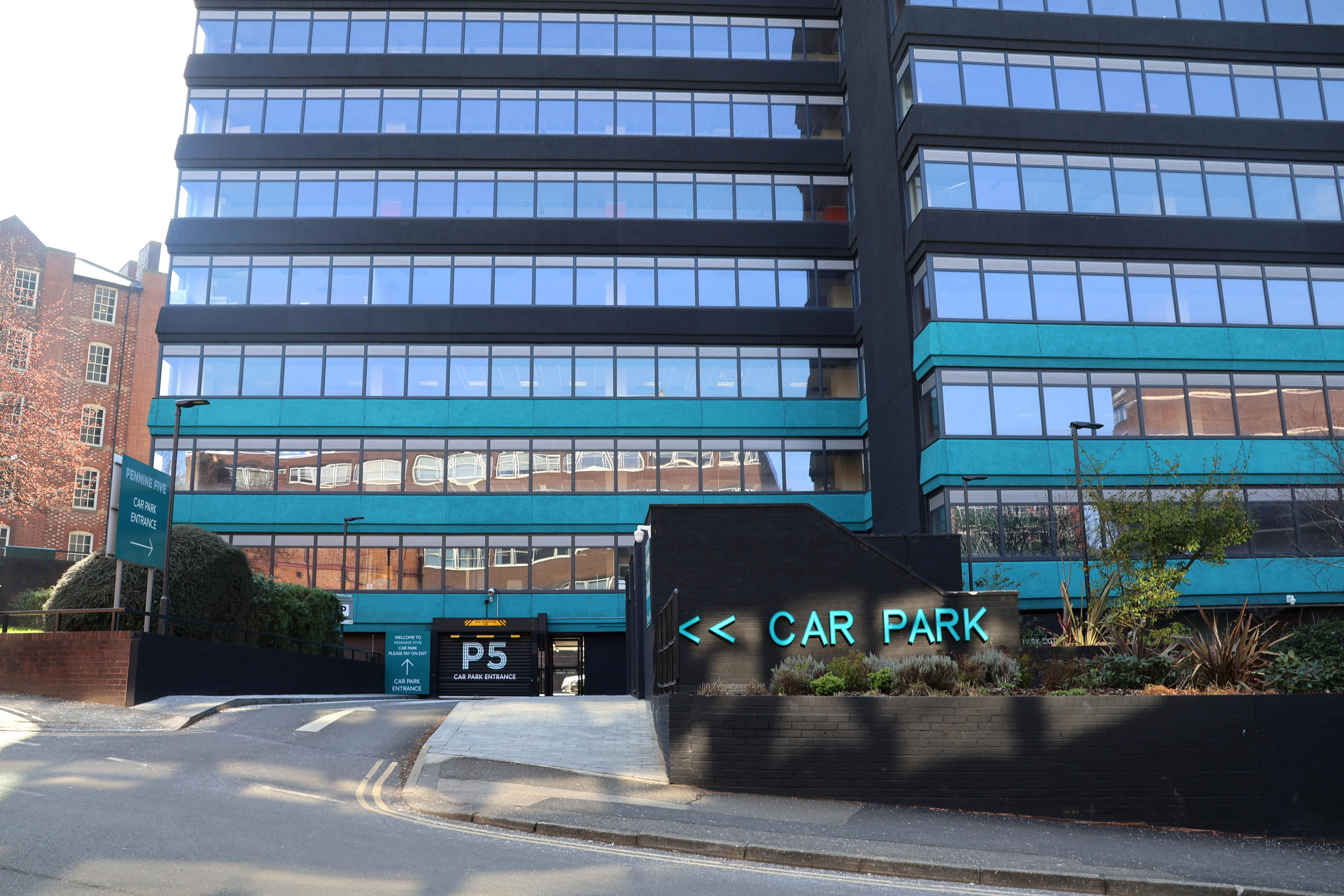

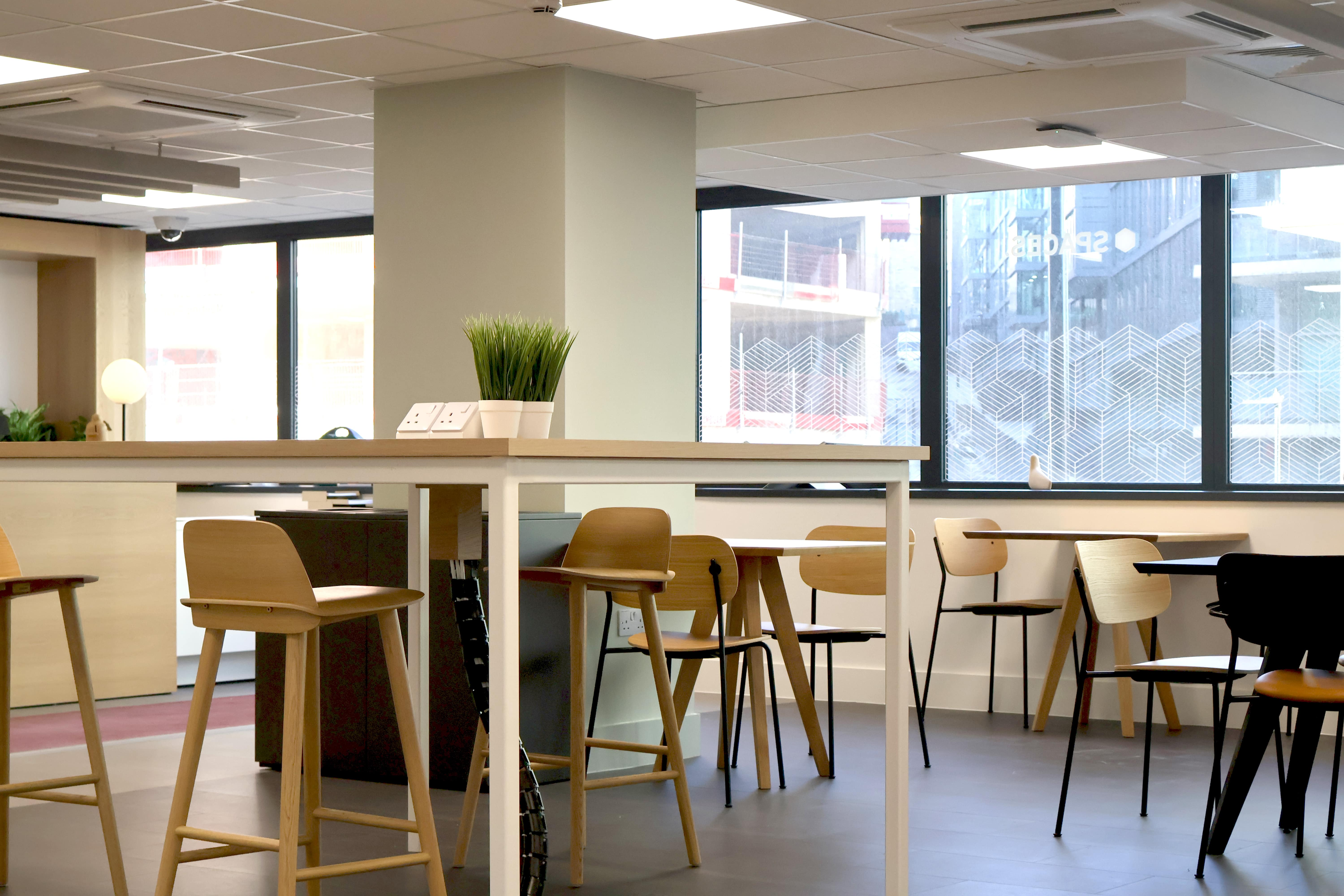

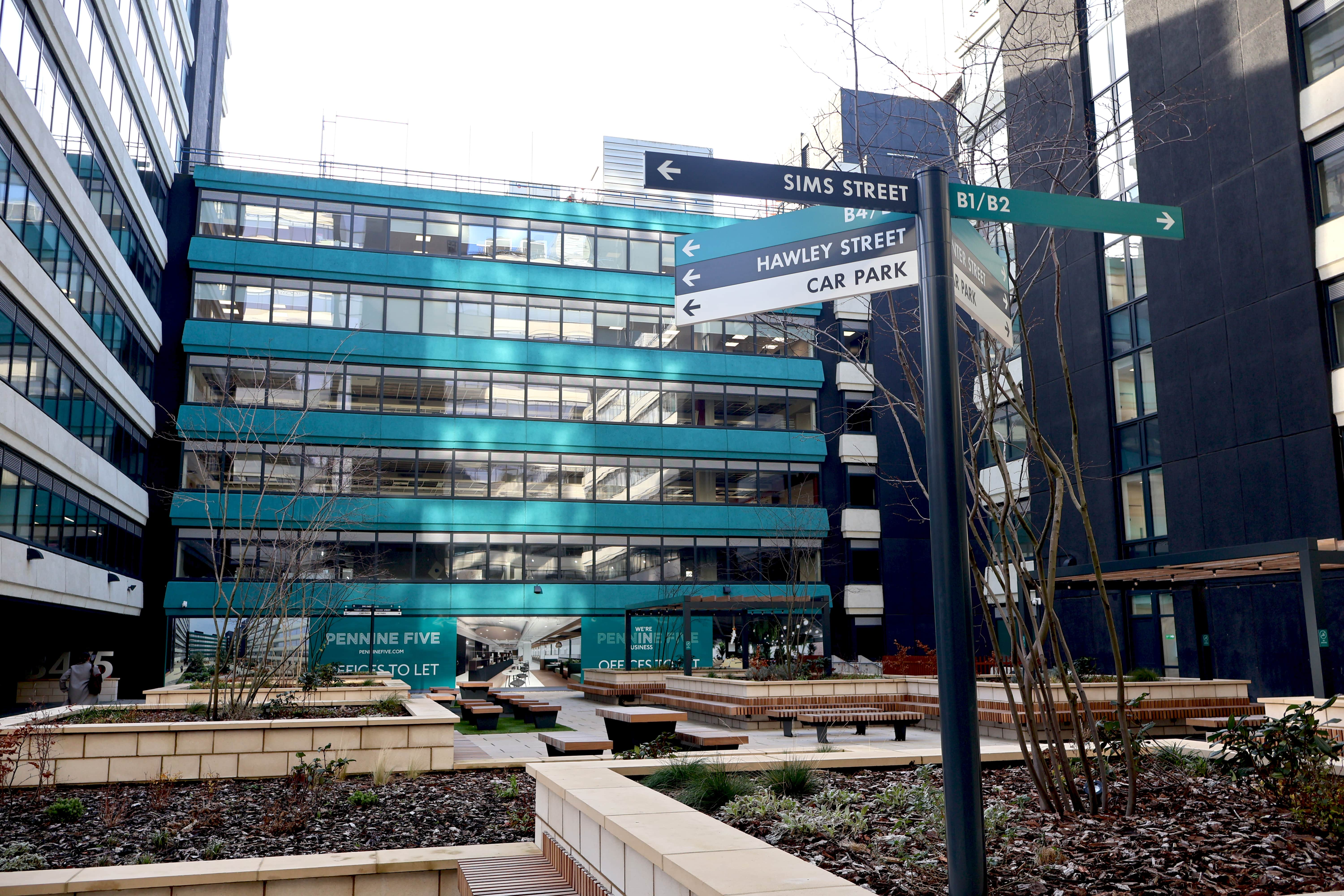
