= CQ ham radio =

Japanese amateur radio magazine

- August, 2008 cover
- Editor: Yoichi Sakurada, JP1NWZ
- Categories: Amateur radio
- Frequency: Monthly
- Circulation: 55,000
- Publisher: CQ Publishing Co., Ltd.
- First issue: October, 1946
- Country: Japan
- Language: Japanese
- Website: www.cqpub.co.jp/cqham/

CQ ham radio is a monthly amateur radio enthusiast magazine published in Japan. The magazine is published in Japanese and draws its subscription base primarily from Japan. The name of the magazine is derived from the international amateur radio call CQ, used to indicate that the station making the call is available for communications with any other station.

CQ ham radio is not associated with the similarly named United States magazine CQ Amateur Radio.
