= Union of Swiss Short Wave Amateurs =

Swiss organization

- Abbreviation: USKA
- Type: Non-profit organization
- Purpose: Advocacy, Education
- Headquarters: Aarau, Switzerland; JN47aj
- Region served: Switzerland
- Official language: German, Italian, French
- President: Willi Vollenweider HB9AMC
- Affiliations: International Amateur Radio Union
- Website: http://www.uska.ch/

The Union of Swiss Short Wave Amateurs (in German, Union Schweizerischer Kurzwellen-Amateure, in Italian, Unione Radioamatori di Onde Corte Svizzeri, in French Union des Amateurs Suisses d'Ondes Courtes) is a national non-profit organization for amateur radio enthusiasts in Switzerland. The organization uses the German language acronym USKA. USKA is incorporated under Article 60 of the Swiss Civil Code and lists as its missions representing the interests of the amateur radio operators of Switzerland before national and international regulatory agencies, advancing the scientific art of radio, supporting emergency communications, and sponsoring contests. USKA is the national member society representing Switzerland in the International Amateur Radio Union.

== Publications ==
The USKA has published a membership journal since 1932. From 1932 to 2007, the magazine was called old man. From 2008, the magazine has been published as HB Radio.

== See also ==
- International Amateur Radio Union
