= CQ (call) =

Operating signal for "request to communicate"

CQ call of German amateur radio station DG2RBH on the 80 m band ("Hello CQ from Delta Golf 2 Romeo Bravo Hotel")

CQ is a station code used by wireless operators derived from long established telegraphic practice on undersea cables and landlines, particularly used by those communicating in Morse code, ( ▄▄▄ ▄ ▄▄▄ ▄ ▄▄▄ ▄▄▄ ▄ ▄▄▄ ), but also by voice operators, to make a general call (called a CQ call). Transmitting the letters CQ on a particular radio frequency means that the transmission is a broadcast or "General Call" to anyone listening, and when the operator sends "K" or says "Go Ahead" it is an invitation for any licensed radio station listening on that frequency to respond. Its use on radio matched the existing use on Morse landline telegraphy and dates from the earliest wireless stations. It was widely used in point-to-point diplomatic and press services, maritime, aviation, and police services until those services eliminated Morse radiotelegraphy. It is still widely used in amateur radio which still has active use of Morse radiotelegraphy.

== History and usage ==
The CQ station code was originally used by land line and undersea cable telegraphy operators in the United Kingdom. An early land line reference to CQ is contained in Electrical Tables and Formulæ: For Use of Telegraph Inspectors and Operators (1871), which lists "The call for 'all stations' (C Q)...". Additionally, in 1884 the telegraphic station code "CQ" was mentioned in The Practical Telegraphist (1884), which lists "CQ all stations"; and The Telegraphist (August 1884).

Demonstration of the spark-gap transmitter at Massie Wireless Station (station "PJ") sending Morse code (CQ DE PJ)

International Morse CQ was adopted by the Marconi Company in 1904 for use in wireless telegraphy, at that time via spark-gap transmitters, and was adopted internationally at the London 1912 International Radiotelegraph Convention, and is still in use.

A variant of the CQ call, CQD, was the first code used as a distress signal. It was proposed by the Marconi Company and adopted in 1904, but was replaced between 1906 and 1908 by the S̅O̅S̅ prosign. When the Titanic sank in 1912, it initially transmitted the distress call CQD DE MGY (with MGY being the ship's call sign). Titanic's radio operator subsequently alternated between SOS and CQD calls afterwards.

In amateur radio use, a CQ call can be qualified by appending more letters, as in CQ DX (meaning "calling all stations located on a different continent from the caller"), or the ITU call sign prefix for a particular country (e.g. CQ VK for "calling Australia" or CQ JA for "calling Japan"). The originator of the call is normally identified by appending the letters DE (French for "from", also means "this is ...") and the call sign of the transmitting station. Another common qualifier is CQ TEST DE, followed by the sender's station ID, which is used in ham radio contests. When using CW mode, unattended receivers connected to a computer may automatically decode the signal and log it on the Reverse Beacon Network.

In the use of single-sideband (SSB) voice or CW mode (morse code telegraphy), an amateur radio operator often makes a general call by transmitting CQ repeatedly (such as CQ CQ CQ) so that other operators scanning for such calls are aided by the familiar rhythmic sound in quickly discriminating distant (weak signal) general callers from other traffic and spurious emissions. This technique allows the other operators to zero-in as close to the caller's center frequency using the human ear to fine-tune their transceiver before engaging the caller in a two-way communication.

The use of a CQ call is almost always used in single-sideband (SSB) voice or CW mode (Morse code telegraphy). Unlike FM mode, in the SSB voice and CW mode areas of the amateur radio bands operators are free to center their transmissions where it is most optimal (such as away from adjacent traffic that can interfere) and not expected to use whole-number, divisible-by-five, or otherwise channelized center frequencies. CQ is in constant use on the amateur bands on shortwave but very rarely used in the FM voice mode of transmission or on FM repeaters common on the VHF and UHF local bands, since tuning of a repeater or FM signal does not require the aid of human perception to perfectly tune the signal.

The code "dah dit dah dit, dah dah dit dah" (the vocalization of ▄▄▄ ▄ ▄▄▄ ▄ ▄▄▄ ▄▄▄ ▄ ▄▄▄ ) was used as part of the chorus to the song "Communications" by Slim Gaillard.

== See also ==
- CQ Amateur Radio, English-language magazine
- CQ ham radio, Japanese-language magazine
- Q codes
- Universal Postal Union
- The dictionary definition of CQ at Wiktionary

== General references ==
- Straw, R Dean, ed. (October 2005). The ARRL Handbook for Radio Communications 2006 (83rd ed.). Newington, CT: American Radio Relay League. ISBN 0-87259-949-3. OCLC 62026192.
- Bergquist, Carl J (2001-05-01). Ham Radio Operator's Guide (2nd ed.). Indianapolis: Prompt Publications. ISBN 0-7906-1238-0. OCLC 47051066.
- Dennison, Mike; Chris Lorek, eds. (June 2005). Radio Communication Handbook (8th ed.). Potters Bar, Hertfordshire, England: Radio Society of Great Britain. ISBN 1-905086-08-3. OCLC 123027893.
- Commercial Traffic Regulations, 1915. Government Printing Office, Washington, DC: United States Naval Radio Service.
