= Old Man (magazine) =

- Old Man cover, Jan./Feb., 2005.
- Categories: Amateur radio
- Frequency: Bimonthly
- Publisher: Union of Swiss Short Wave Amateurs
- Founded: 1932
- Final issue: November/December 2007
- Country: Switzerland
- Language: German, Italian, French
- Website: www.uska.ch

Old Man (stylized in all lowercase) was a bimonthly magazine published by the Union of Swiss Short Wave Amateurs as the membership journal of the organization. After the end of Old Man in 2007, it since recontinued as HBradio.

The magazine covers topics related to amateur radio. The magazine is published with articles in three languages: German, Italian, and French. The magazine drew and draws its subscription base primarily from Switzerland. The journal was published in A5 paper size with a full-color cover and black-and-white print on un-coated newsprint inside. The final issue of Old Man was published in November/December 2007, after which the organization discontinued publication in favor of a new membership journal called HBradio.
