= Cathedral Quarter, Derby =

Area of Derby, England

Derby Cathedral from Cathedral Green
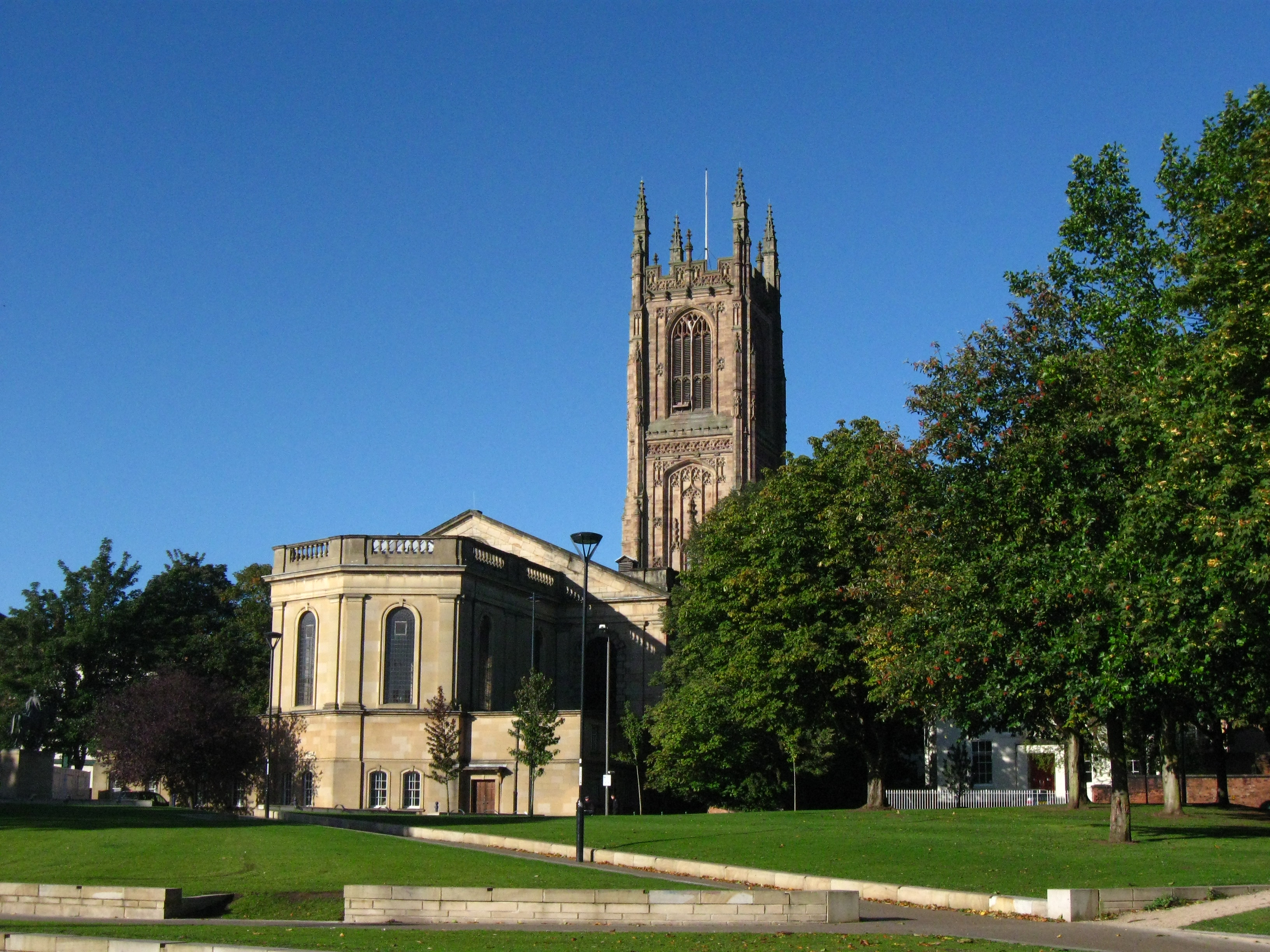
- Location: in Cathedral Quarter Derby
- Coordinates: 52.9254°N 1.4793°W
- Website: Official site

The Cathedral Quarter is one of five areas within Derby city centre, based around the name of the Cathedral. It is bound by St Alkmund's Way and Ford Street to the north and west, the River Derwent to the east, and Albert Street, Victoria Street, Wardwick and Friargate to the south. It is a shopping, business, retail and cultural quarter, containing many key arts and tourist venues. These include Derby Museum and Art Gallery, Derby Central Library, Derby Local Studies Library, The Silk Mill, Déda, The QUAD, The Assembly Rooms, The Guildhall, Derby Tourist Information centre and, of course, Derby Cathedral. The Silk Mill is at the start of the Derwent Valley World Heritage Site, marking the city's important role in the birth of the Industrial Revolution. Many outdoor events take place within The Cathedral Quarter, mostly centred on The Market Place or Cathedral Green.
