= CQ Amateur Radio =

Magazine for amateur radio enthusiasts

- August 2010 Cover
- Editor: Richard Moseson, W2VU
- Categories: Amateur radio
- Frequency: Monthly
- Circulation: 60,000 (2012)
- Publisher: CQ Communications, Inc.
- First issue: January 1945
- Country: United States
- Based in: Hicksville, New York
- Language: English
- Website: cq-amateur-radio.com
- ISSN: 0007-893X
- OCLC: 310821852

CQ Amateur Radio (also known simply as CQ or CQ magazine, and formerly as CQ: The Radio Amateur's Journal) is a dormant magazine for amateur radio enthusiasts first published in 1945. The English language edition is read worldwide; Spanish language edition is published in Spain, with some translations of articles from the English language edition, and some original European content. The magazine was also published in France with partial translation of the original edition between 1995–2000 (ISSN 1267-2750). Published by CQ Communications, the title is based on the radio call "CQ".

== Contests and awards ==
CQ Amateur Radio previously organized, adjudicated, and published the results of several annual radio competitions:

- CQ World Wide 160 m Contest
- CQ World Wide WPX Contest, the CQ World Wide RTTY Contest
- CQ World Wide RTTY WPX Contest, the CQ World Wide DX Contest
- CQ World Wide VHF Contest.

All of these contests allow participation by amateur radio operators in any country of the world.

While CQ has sponsored these contests, the administration of these contests is now done via independent contest committees under the auspices of the World Wide Radio Operators Foundation (WWROF). WWROF administers the infrastructure for contest log submission, log checking, and performs other services in support of the contests.

CQ Amateur Radio is also associated with a number of amateur radio awards, of which the best known is Worked All Zones. Others offered are the WPX and the "USA Counties" awards.

== Suspension of publication ==
In December 2023, Moseson had communicated to some subscribers via e-mail that publication of the magazine had been suspended. The last issue published was October 2023 in digital format on Zinio. Since then, digital subscribers were issued partial refunds for the balance of their subscriptions. CQ magazine had been seeking funding to continue operations.

The magazine’s publisher, Richard A. Ross, K2MGA died on April 27, 2024. Ross had been the magazine’s publisher since 1979.

== See also ==
- Worked All Zones
