= 60-meter band =

Amateur radio frequency band

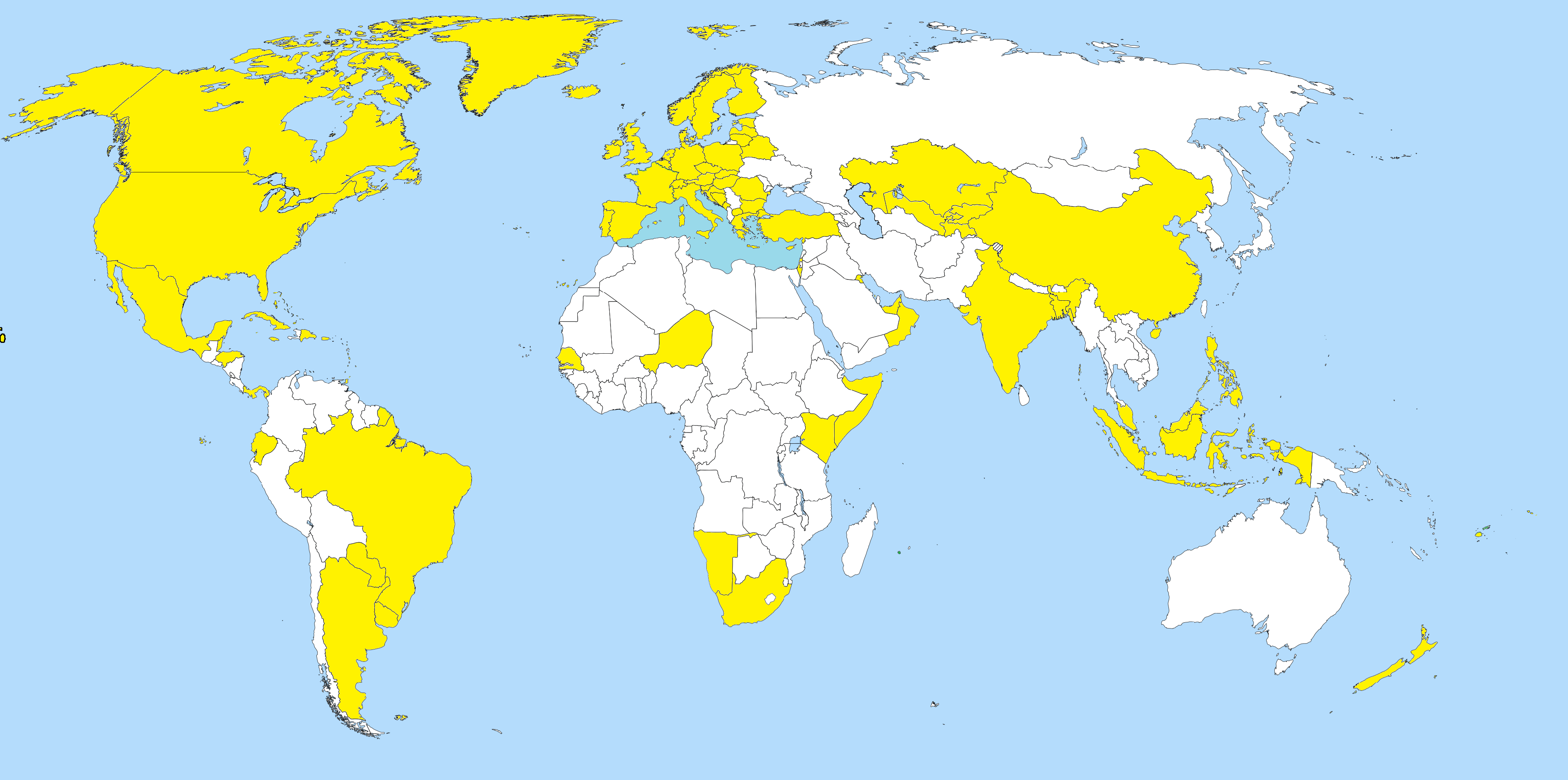
This map shows all the countries that currently have an official Amateur Radio presence on 5 MHz / 60 m, whether it be by WRC-15, Article 4.4, Special Individual Permits, Trial and/or Emergency Basis, or any combination of these.

The 60-meter band or 5 MHz band is a relatively new amateur radio allocation. First introduced in 2002, it was originally available in only a few countries, including the United States, United Kingdom, Ireland, Norway, Finland, Denmark, and Iceland. Several decades in use, an increasing proportion of countries' telecommunications administrations – together with their government and military users – have permitted Amateur Radio operation in the 5 MHz area on a short or longer-term basis, ranging from discrete channels to a frequency band.

At the closing meeting of the 2015 ITU World Radio communication Conference (WRC-15) on November 27, 2015, amongst the Final Acts signed into the International Radio Regulations was one approving "A Worldwide Frequency Allocation of 5351.5–5366.5 kHz to the Amateur Service on a secondary basis". The ITU's enhanced band allocation limits most amateurs to 15 watts effective isotropic radiated power (EIRP), with some countries allowed up to 25 W EIRP. The ITU allocation came into effect January 1, 2017, after which each country's national administration must formally revise their rules to permit amateur operation.

Prior to WRC-15, all 5 MHz Amateur allocations made by individual administrations were in accordance with Article 4.4 of the ITU Radio Regulations, which requires non-interference with other radio services. Where two-way amateur radio communication is authorized on 60 m, it has generally been within the frequency range 5250–5450 kHz, but the whole of this range is not necessarily available and allocations vary significantly from country-to-country. This has been particularly true in latter years since the award at WRC-12 of the range 5250–5275 kHz to the Radiolocation Service, thus effectively reducing the former frequency range down to 5275–5450 kHz.

In some countries the allocation is still channelized at present, whereas others have block or band allocations or a mixture. Voice operation is generally in upper sideband (USB) mode to facilitate inter-communication by non-amateur service users if necessary. In the United States and its territories and possessions, channelized USB is mandatory. Where channelization is used, the USB suppressed carrier frequency (a.k.a. 'dial' frequency) is normally 1.5 kHz below the quoted channel frequency. For example, 5403.5 kHz is the 'dial' frequency for the channel centered on 5405 kHz. The "center" of the channel is based on the assumption that the bandwidth of SSB transmissions are 3 kHz, at most. Transmitters that are capable of wider SSB bandwidths should be adjusted for 3 kHz bandwidth or less so their emissions stay within the allocated channel.

Amateur equipment made in Japan and surrounding countries often did not originally support the 60-meter allocation. However, it is usually possible to modify such equipment to work correctly on these frequencies within the terms of the individual's licensing conditions. More recently, commercial amateur radio equipment manufactured in Asia has begun to include provision for 60 m / 5 MHz operation, following the WRC-15 decision.

== International Regulatory Status and World Radiocommunication Conferences ==
The amateur radio service is unusual in the fact that it is regulated by international treaty. Worldwide amateur allocations are determined by the International Telecommunication Union (ITU), which allocates global radio spectrum and satellite orbits, develops the technical standards that ensure networks and technologies seamlessly interconnect and strive to improve access to ICTs to underserved communities worldwide. This is done through successive World Radiocommunication Conferences (WRCs), which take place approximately every 3–5 years, when telecommunications administrations and organizations from all around the globe meet to make decisions on these elements.

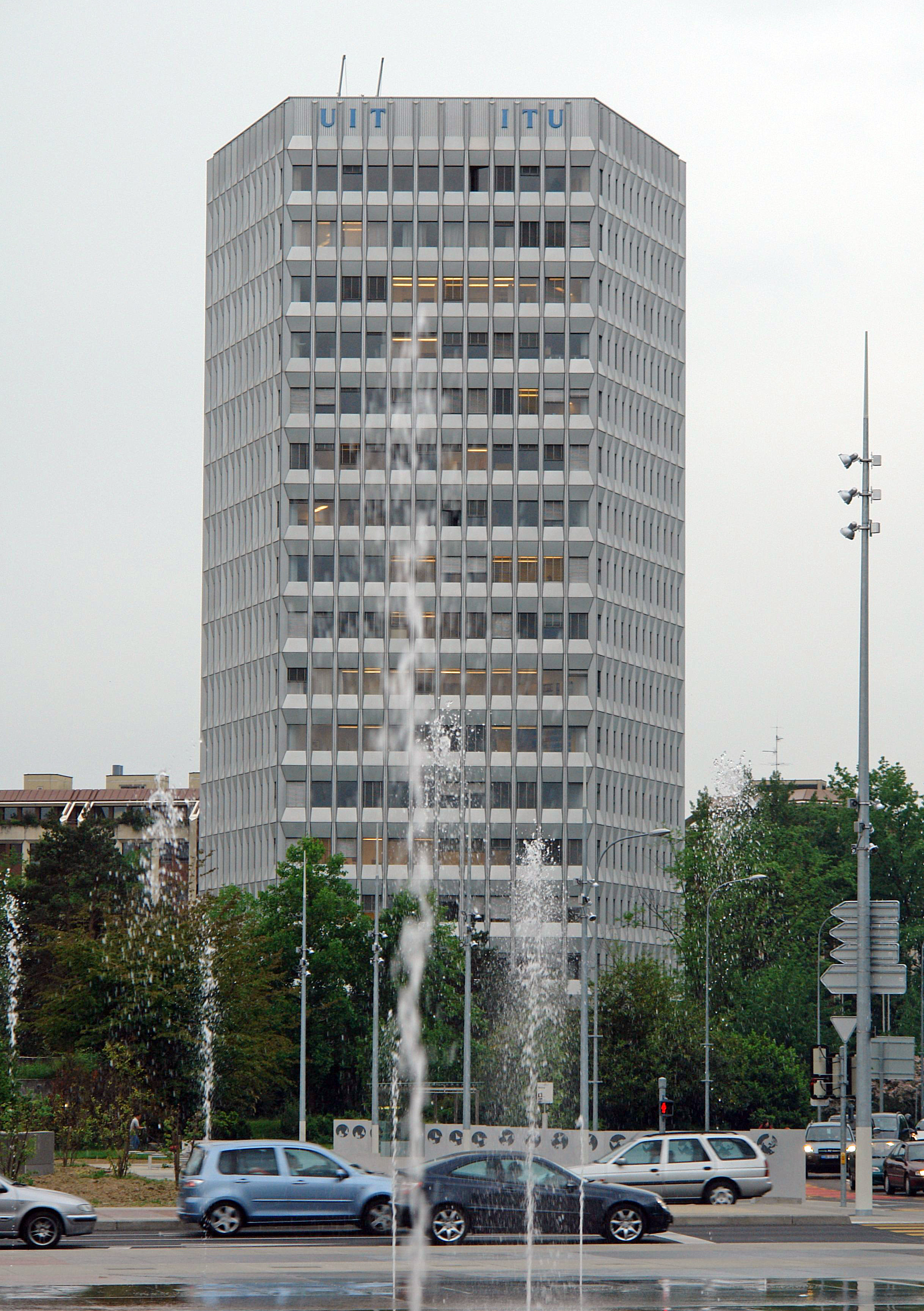
ITU headquarters, Geneva

At the conclusion of the ITU 2012 World Radiocommunication Conference (WRC-12) on Friday 17 February 2012, Resolution 649 [COM6/12] (WRC12) was ratified as being placed on the Agenda for the following WRC in 2015 (WRC-15). This resolution invited WRC-15 to consider "The possibility of making an allocation of an appropriate amount of spectrum, not necessarily contiguous, to the amateur service on a secondary basis within the band 5250–5450 kHz".

Following the decision at WRC-12 to implement a Radiolocation allocation from 5250 to 5275 kHz, the candidate band for an amateur allocation at WRC-15 subsequently became truncated to the 5275 to 5450 kHz sector.

On September 11, 2014, the National Telecommunications Agency of Brazil (ANATEL) announced its intention to propose an amateur service allocation from 5275 to 5450 kHz in the 60 m band at the next meeting of CITEL (Inter-American Telecommunication Commission). At the CITEL Regional Conference held in Mérida City, Mexico in October 2014, the conference recognised an IAP (Inter-American Proposal) for a Secondary Amateur Allocation from 5275 to 5450 kHz. This was proposed by Brazil, together with Argentina, Uruguay, El Salvador, Dominican Republic and Nicaragua, making up the required six administrations. Following the proposal a footnote stressed that "National administrations can adopt additional constrains to provide further compatibility with existed services."

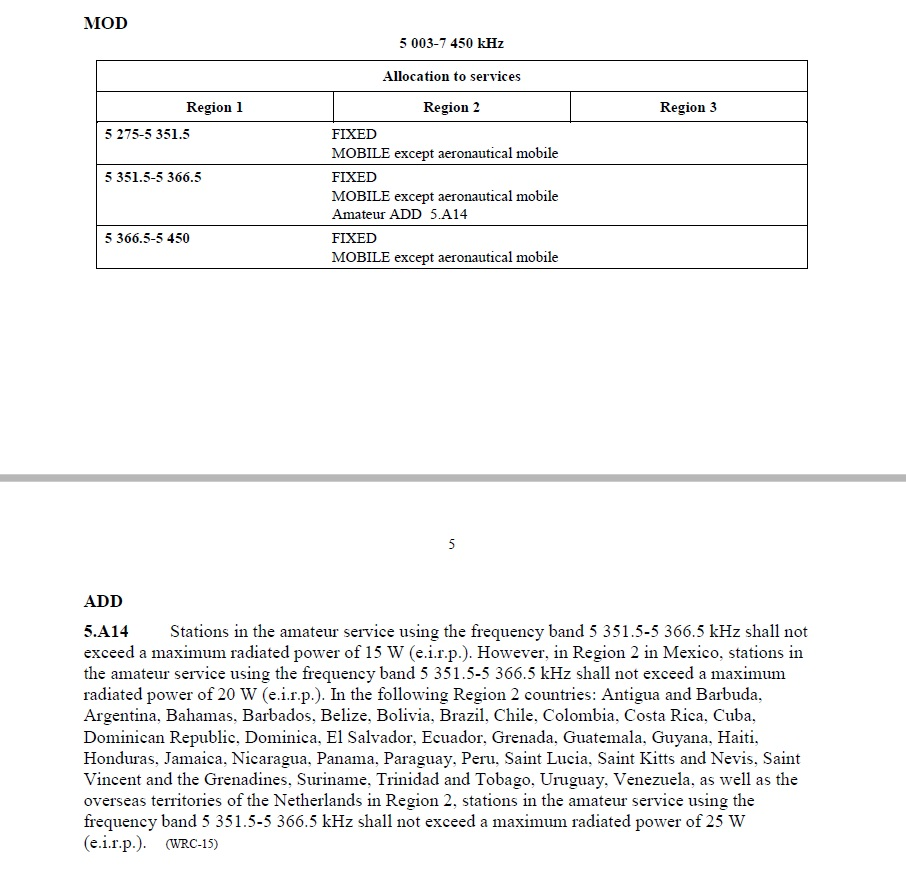
Amateur 60 m / 5 MHz Allocation Extract from ITU publication 'Final Acts WRC-15'

The final meeting of the CEPT (Conférence Européenne des Postes et Télécommunications) Conference Preparatory Group took place in Bergen, Norway during the week 14–18 September 2015 at which was adopted the final European Common Proposal for WRC-15 Agenda Item 1.4 – the adoption of a European Common Proposal for an allocation of 100 kHz between 5350 and 5450 kHz for the Amateur Service.

The ITU 2015 World Radiocommunication Conference (WRC-15) took place in Geneva, Switzerland from 2 until 27 November 2015, where Agenda Item 1.4 went through a significant amount of discussion and debate until a consensus was eventually reached, whereby at the Concluding Meeting of WRC-15 on 27 November 2015, a Final Act was signed, approving a secondary amateur allocation of 5351.5–5366.5 kHz. Most stations are limited to 15 watts EIRP, with the exception of Mexico, who are allowed 20 W EIRP, and Central & South America, plus most of the Caribbean areas who are permitted 25 W EIRP. (see adjoining WRC-15 regulations extract for full country information). The allocation went into effect from January 1, 2017.

== Bandplan ==
A bandplan has been adopted by the IARU (International Amateur Radio Union), for the WRC-15 60m Secondary allocation (5351.5–5366.5 kHz).

5351.5	5354	5357	5360	5363	5366–5366.5
CW and narrow digital modes	All modes, USB voice				Weak signal, narrow band
200 Hz	2700 Hz				20 Hz

The bandplan strongly recommends that the WRC-15 frequencies should only be used if other 5 MHz frequencies, allocated under Article 4.4, are not available.

It does not require stations to adopt the USB dial frequencies of 5354, 5357, 5360 and 5363 kHz but these frequencies provide a good fit with the American channel on 5357 kHz, and UK stations which can use 5354 and 5363 kHz but not 5360 kHz. Also, it is only by using these exact frequencies that there will be enough room for four simultaneous SSB conversations without mutual interference, assuming the 2.8 kHz de facto standard bandwidth of typical SSB transceivers.

WRC-15 frequencies, like all others, can only be used when they have been licensed for amateur use by a country's regulator.

== Propagation characteristics ==
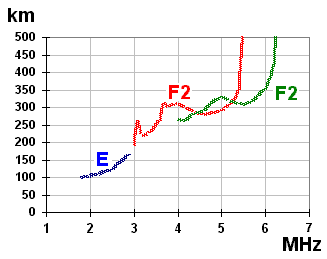
Typical ionogram indicating foF2 of approximately 5.4 MHz.

Lying approximately halfway between 80 m (3.5 MHz) and 40 m (7 MHz), the 60-meter (5 MHz) band forms a communication bridge when propagation effects make use of 80 or 40 m impossible for local-to-medium distance communications – usually between 0–650 km (0–400 miles), often needed in emergency communication scenarios where there is no existing normal communications infrastructure or where the normal communications infrastructure has been devastated by either manmade or natural disaster(s). Less affected by D-Layer absorption than 80 m, the 60-meter (5 MHz) band is an ideal candidate for near vertical incidence skywave (NVIS), the most commonly used technique capable of providing seamless local-to-medium distance HF communications. Information about the critical frequency (foF2) of the ionosphere at any one time is highly important for setting up and maintaining reliable NVIS radio links. This information can be found online from ionograms produced by local ionosondes at this site

== Propagation beacons ==
A number of amateur radio propagation beacons are active on 5 MHz, some of which produce a sequence of varying power levels in various transmission formats. A number of these transmit 24/7 (but not all) and some personal beacons are activated as required.

On the 5290 kHz channel (5289.5 kHz USB) is the Danish (ITU Region 1) personal beacon OV1BCN (JO55si), operated by OZ1FJB, particularly for NVIS observations. From Spring 2011, it has been in operation h24 and is sequenced to transmit 2 minutes after the UK beacons, (hr+ 04/19/34/49 min.), transmitting a USB-announcement, followed by CW + MT63 identifications. (Info: Lars, OZ1FJB)

The South African Amateur Radio League – SAARL – (ITU Region 1) As of May 2017, the South African 5 MHz WSPR Cluster has two permanent beacons – currently ZS6SRL in Johannesburg (KG33wv) and ZS1OA (JF95fx) in Cape Town. Although no longer operational, when SARL first announced its intention to have a 5 MHz Beacon operational, the South African club KARTS – Kempton Park Amateur Radio and Technical Society commissioned a WSPR beacon callsign ZS6KTS (KG43cw), initially on 5250 kHz. At a meeting during Summer 2014 with their regulator, ICASA (The Independent Communications Authority of South Africa), SARL reached an agreement to exchange their channel at 5250 kHz for the more common beacon channel of 5290 kHz.

The 60 m band was released for amateur radio in Switzerland (ITU Region 1 ) in January 2017, however the Sursee Amateur Radio Club obtained earlier the necessary official authorizations from their Federal Office of Communications for a Swiss 5 MHz Experimental Beacon project. Using the callsign HB9AW, the beacon became operational on 5291.0 kHz at 0000 hrs UTC on 1 June 2014. The transmission commences with the call sign HB9AW in CW (100HA1B), followed by five 5 seconds-long dashes. The dashes are each accurately attenuated by 10 dB in the EIRP power sequence 10 W, 5 W, 1 W, 100 mW, concluding with 10 mW, and repeats every 5 minutes, commencing on the hour. The beacon transmits from Sursee (Locator: JN47be) using a half-wave dipole, configured for high-angle radiation as an NVIS 'fountain' type antenna at a height above ground of 0.12 of a wavelength. A reflector is placed beneath the antenna. The aim of the system is to explore the propagation conditions on 5 MHz in the hills and valleys of Switzerland in relation to its possible suitability as an Emergency Communications band. An on-line form on the Sursee Amateur Radio Club's website accepts reception reports.

9A5ADI has established a QRPp (very low power) CW Beacon 9A5ADI/B on 5288.8 kHz running 100 mW into a 15 m long wire. It is located in Vinkovci (JN95jg). The transmission sequence is as follows - 10 seconds tone, v v v, callsign, power, locator, room temperature and pressure.

The Luxembourg (ITU Region 1) national amateur radio society, Radioamateurs du Luxembourg, has re-established a beacon on 5205.25 kHz under the callsign LX0HF. Located near Junglinster (JN39dr), the beacon's power is 5 W EIRP, transmitting a continuous carrier with callsign identification at one minute intervals.

In the United Kingdom (ITU Region 1) the last of the 3 UK beacons, GB3ORK (Orkneys – IO89ka) is now no longer active on 5290 kHz following the expiry of its NoV (UK licence Notice of Variation). Originally three beacons transmitted sequentially on the hour and each subsequent 15 minutes primarily using CW. They were in transmission order – GB3RAL, GB3WES and GB3ORK, from approximately southern, central and northern locations in the UK respectively.

The German (ITU Region 1) Amateur Radio Club (DARC) operates a propagation information beacon, under the non-amateur call sign DRA5 (JO44vo), on 5195 kHz, which transmits in CW (Morse code) plus various digital modulation systems. It is co-sited with the DKØWCY 30 and 80 m beacons. Owing to considerations of the rising cost of electrical power, the operational schedule of DRA5 has changed and it no longer transmits over the full 24-hour period. It is currently operational 0400–2200 UTC during the Summertime period and 0500–2300 UTC during the Wintertime period. These times of year correspond to those of the seasonal clock changes in Germany.(Source: Beacon keeper DK4VW e-mail 18th July 2013)

In addition, individual WSPR beacon experiments using powers as low as 1 watt in the UK have led to reception reports from the US and Middle East. South African tests using 5-20 watts have led to reception reports from the US, Europe, Australia and South America. Further research is likely in this area..

As well as amateur radio beacons in the 5 MHz sector, some other non-amateur stations are used informally as propagation indicators. These include:

- Standard Frequency & Time Stations
  - RWM (Moscow) on 4996 kHz
  - BPM (Xi'an), YVTO (Caracas), HLA (Daejeon, S. Korea), WWV (Colorado) & WWVH (Hawaii) on 5000 kHz
- VOLMET – Aviation Meteorological Information Broadcasts (all USB):
  - "Military One Information VOLMET" on 5450 kHz (previously called 'R.A.F. VOLMET')
  - "South America VOLMET" on 5451 and 5475 kHz
  - "Africa VOLMET" on 5499 kHz
  - "Shannon VOLMET" (Republic of Ireland) on 5505 kHz

== United Kingdom ==
In the UK (ITU Region 1), the 60-meter segment (also known by its frequency equivalent: 'the 5 MHz band') is only available to UK Full Licensees. Foundation and Intermediate licensee use is not permitted.

The band has been the subject of active research by radio amateurs due to its propagation properties. This research commenced in August 2002 by means of a special 5 MHz 'Notice of Variation' (NoV) to the Full UK Licence. Five 3 kHz-wide channels, 5258.5, 5278.5, 5288.5, 5398.5 and 5403.5 kHz were allocated, which by mid-2006 had been increased to seven, the additional ones being 5366.5 and 5371.5 kHz (all USB dial frequencies). In December 2012, UK regulator, Ofcom, announced permission for 11 new frequency blocks, following representations from the RSGB and subsequent Ofcom discussions with the 'Primary User' of 5 MHz in the UK, the British Ministry of Defence (MoD). Although the MoD was unable to permit a continuous band, this allocation of seven channels was substantially increased to eleven frequency 'blocks' (or 'bandlets'), integrating the existing channels. These became active on 1 January 2013.

Following an Ofcom consultation document on a review of the UK Amateur Licence during 2014, in 2015 Ofcom issued a new UK Amateur Licence which incorporated the UK 5 MHz allocation into the main licence schedule for all UK Full Licensees (Individual, Club, Reciprocal). This came into force on 7 April 2015. The previous 5 MHz 'Notice-of-Variation' (NoV) is now no longer required, however it is still a licence requirement that the Licensee shall only operate on the band to the extent that the Licensee can be contacted on a telephone which is located in close proximity to the Station.

There are some additional restrictions which still apply:

- Maximum Antenna Height is 20 metres (66 ft) AGL (above ground level)
- Neither mobile nor maritime mobile operation permitted
- Power is limited to 100 watts PEP (not to exceed 200 W EIRP)
- Maximum Permitted Transmission Bandwidth is 6 kHz (double sideband)

All Modes are allowed. This provision is on a Secondary, non-interference (NIB) basis. Instructions on amateur radio 60 m operations in the UK are provided in the RSGB '5 MHz' web pages and at the Ofcom Amateur Radio Section.

The UK 5 MHz Frequency Blocks are as follows (all in kHz):

From	To	Width
5258.5	5264.0	5.5
5276.0	5284.0	8.0
5288.5	5292.0	3.5
5298.0	5307.0	9.0
5313.0	5323.0	10.0
5333.0	5338.0	5.0
5354.0	5358.0	4.0
5362.0	5374.5	12.5
5378.0	5382.0	4.0
5395.0	5401.5	6.5
5403.5	5406.5	3.0

As well as Analogue Voice and CW, the band in the UK is also used for Digital Communications in modes such as PSK31, Olivia, MFSK, MT63, SSTV, Hellschreiber, JT65A, JT9, FT8 and FT4 – success being shown with most modes, despite the problems that can result from ionospheric distortion, particularly to the phase of the signal.

The Summits on the Air (SOTA) program uses 5 MHz for a number of activations, with considerable activity from some operators.

In the UK, 5 MHz is also used for one of the weekly RSGB (Radio Society of Great Britain) News bulletin broadcasts under the special transmit-only callsign GB2RS. The transmission takes place on Sundays at 1500 hrs UTC on 5398.5 kHz USB. The intention is to prove that 5 MHz provides a reliable vehicle for a National News broadcast which is able to cover the whole of the UK. After the News a net is carried out under the commemorative callsign G5MHZ with signal reports exchanged, both with UK listeners and others further afield.

This band is unique in the United Kingdom insofar as UK 5 MHz operators may also communicate under controlled operating conditions with UK Military stations or UK Military Cadet Youth Organizations with links to the MoD using these frequencies. They use MoD allocated call signs, which differ significantly from those issued by Ofcom to the Amateur Radio Service in the UK. In 2016, the RAFAC (RAF Air Cadets) introduced and coordinate several events during the year called 'Exercise Blue Ham' in which Military Cadets exchange radio contact information with amateur stations on the UK 5 MHz amateur allocations.

The HF Team of RAYNET-UK (Radio Amateurs' Emergency Network – the UK's Amateur Radio Emergency Communications body) includes 5 MHz in its regular 7 Day cycle of HF Nets (See RAYNET-UK HF Team reference in 'External links' section)

The 5 MHz band has proved to support reliable intra-UK communication using low power and NVIS (Near Vertical Incidence Skywave) antennas under daylight conditions, but as with other bands can be sometimes affected by solar disturbances. Several technical papers have also been published on NVIS at 5 MHz, utilizing information gleaned from monitoring of the UK 5 MHz beacon chain over the numerous years of its existence.

== United States ==
On December 9, 2025, US regulator the Federal Communications Commission (FCC), published a very detailed ‘Report & Order’ No. FCC-25-60A1 which contained the news that they had added the WRC-15 Secondary allocation of 5351.5 – 5366.5 kHz at 9.15 W ERP (FCC preferring ERP to the EIRP version of 15 W) and a maximum bandwidth of 2.8 kHz. General and higher classes of license are permitted. Readers of the document's Amateur Radio part (Section B, page 17) will find that four of the existing five discrete 3 kHz-wide channels centered on 5332, 5348, 5373, and 5405 kHz are also retained, under the same criteria as before – Secondary, 100 W ERP, 2.8 kHz maximum bandwidth, General and higher licensees. The former Channel 3 at 5357 kHz now lies within the new WRC-15 60m Secondary Allocation and so now subject to a power limit of 9.15 W ERP. The new regulations came into effect on Friday 13 February 2026

The Federal Communications Commission (FCC) made the 60-meter band available to General, Advanced and Amateur Extra US amateur radio license classes in 2003. The four channels now used for the 60-meter band in the USA (ITU Region 2) are

Center	'Dial' Frequency (USB)	'Unofficial' Channel Designation
5332.0 kHz	5330.5 kHz	Channel 1
5348.0 kHz	5346.5 kHz	Channel 2
5373.0 kHz	5371.5 kHz	Channel 3
5405.0 kHz	5403.5 kHz	Channel 4

60 m	5330–5406 kHz
United States	
General, Advanced, Extra
Note: US licensees operating on 60 m with emissions of upper sideband voice, suppressed carrier, 2.8 kHz bandwidth (2K80J3E), should use the dial frequencies indicated on the lower part of this chart.

Modes permitted:

- USB Voice (2K80J3E)
- CW (150HA1A)
- RTTY (60H0J2B) (Example: PSK31)
- Data (2K80J2D) (Example: Pactor III or Packet)

which includes any digital mode modulated in a single sideband transmitter, with a bandwidth of 2.8 kHz or less whose technical characteristics have been documented publicly, per Part 97.309(4) of the FCC Rules. Such modes would include PACTOR I, II or III, 300-baud packet, MFSK, MT63, Contestia, Olivia, DominoEX, FT8 and others.

Maximum Power: 100 W PEP ERP referenced to a half-wave dipole. Secondary status.

At no time may any transmission exceed the channel bandwidth of 2.8 kHz and the center of all CW and RTTY (data) emissions must coincide with the authorized center frequencies. Automatic operation is not permitted and the control operator of a station transmitting data emissions must exercise care to limit the length of transmission so as to avoid causing harmful interference to United States Government stations.

On 5 March 2012, following earlier proposals by the American Radio Relay League (ARRL), the FCC brought into effect new rules detailing several changes in US 60-meter amateur radio operations. These included:

- 5358.5 kHz replacing 5368 kHz (heavily utilized by one of the primary users).
- Additional modes as detailed above, supplementing existing USB voice provision.
- A power increase from 50 W to 100 W.

These frequencies are also authorized to certain US Government and Military users to establish interoperability with Amateur Radio operators in disasters. This is exercised several times each year in the USNORTHCOM led exercise "Vital Connections", Department of Defense exercises utilizing MARS stations, and exercising 60-meter band interoperability has become a regular component of FEMA communications exercises in the Regions. The Ohio Military Reserve annual BLACK SWAN communication exercise emphasizes interoperability among Amateur, SHARES, and MARS stations, supported by weekly training to common standards for waveforms, procedure words, and procedure signals. High Power night time broadcasts have been utilized in exercises to provide information and instructions from the Government to Amateur radio operators across North America. Government stations using these frequencies are authorized significantly more power than Amateurs.

As a part of preparation of justification for a 60-meter band, the ARRL organized a group of twelve amateur radio operators, most of whom had experience in trying to communicate with stations in the Caribbean to obtain eyewitness reports of hurricanes in that region. The group was assigned by FCC WA2Xxx call signs and allowed to transmit on the 60-meter band as experimental stations. That group's report of conditions on that band became central to ARRL's request for the band for amateur use. That initial effort stressed continuous communication with the Caribbean hurricane region and timely reports to the Miami National Hurricane Center to supplement other observations and to take emergency messages.

== Countries with band allocations ==
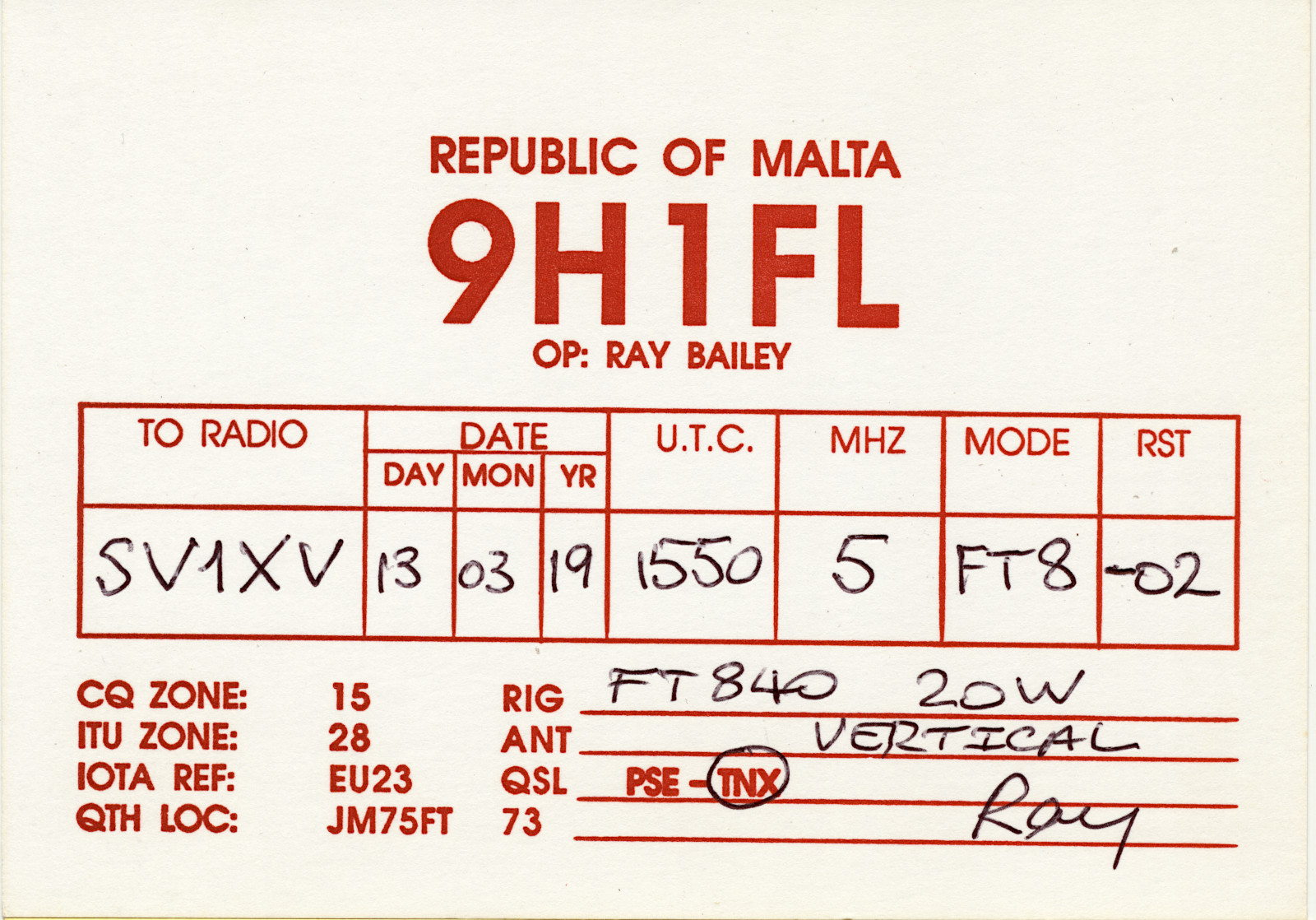
60-meter QSL card from Malta

Andorra (ITU Region 1): In June 2016, Andorran amateurs were permitted access to the new WRC-15 60 m allocation from 5351.5 to 5366.5 kHz on a Secondary basis with a maximum power of 15 W EIRP; modes are permitted CW and SSB. Prior to that, the Andorran national amateur radio society, URA – Unio de Radioaficionats Andorrans, announced in July 2014 that they had received official permission to operate between 5275 and 5450 kHz on a secondary basis for short and medium distance propagation studies. Maximum power allowed was 100 W PEP with a bandwidth not exceeding 3 kHz utilizing CW and USB. That permission was temporary until WRC-15 the license then being annulled from December 2015. (Source: C31CT)

Argentina (ITU Region 2): Following petitions to their regulator over a number of years, the Argentine national society, The Radio Club Argentino (RCA) has succeeded in obtaining changes and additions to their bands. Among these was the new WRC-15 60 m secondary allocation of 5351.5 to 5366.5 kHz with a maximum power of 25 W EIRP. This was published in the official government gazette, the Boletin Oficial de la Republica Argentina (p. 35) and became effective on February 5, 2018.

Austria (ITU Region 1): In December 2020, the frequency range of 5351.3 to 5366.5 was allocated to the amateur radio service on a secondary basis with a maximum radiated power of 15 W EIRP by the Austrian telecom regulator BMVIT.

Bahamas (ITU Region 2): It has been found that since 2009, The Bahamas has had a 60 m Amateur Secondary Allocation of 5330 – 5406 kHz. However a recent update to their National Frequency Allocation Table shows the WRC-15 60 m Amateur Secondary Allocation of 5351.5 to 5366.5 kHz at 25 W EIRP. News is awaited of which allocation is now in force, hence both allocations are currently recorded.

Bangladesh (ITU Region 3): From 2005, the band 5250–5310 kHz was allocated nationally to the amateur service on a secondary basis for propagation experiments. Stations of the amateur service in Bangladesh shall not cause harmful interference to any station operating in accordance with the ITU Radio Regulations, which in this case will be of a governmental or commercial nature. All modes are permitted. (Source: Bangladesh Telecoms Administration NFAP)

Barbados (ITU Region 2): From August 2019, the regulator has updated the 60 m allocation to 5332 – 5405 kHz. Previous operation was from 5250 to 5400 kHz, maximum power 100 W PEP.

Belarus (ITU Region 1): From July 2016, amateurs in Belarus have had access to the WRC-15 allocation from 5351.5 to 5366.5 kHz. Maximum Power is 50 Watts. SSB, CW and digital modes are permitted to Class A (top level) Licensees.

Belgium (ITU Region 1): At the beginning of March 2016, the Belgian telecoms regulator, IBPT/BIPT, issued a decision permitting access to the new WRC-15 60 m allocation for all Belgian Class A amateur licensees (also known as the HAREC licence). The allocation is from 5351.5 to 5366.5 kHz on a Secondary basis with a maximum power of 15 W EIRP. All modes are permitted.

Belize (ITU Region 2): The new Belize Amateur Radio Club (BARC) website carries information that the new WRC-15 Amateur Secondary 60 m allocation of 5351.5 – 5366.5 kHz has become available with a maximum power limit of 25 W EIRP.

Bosnia & Herzegovina (ITU Region 1): Bosnia & Herzegovina have been authorized by their regulator, RAK, for 5 MHz operation under the new WRC-15 Secondary Allocation 5351.5 – 5366.5 kHz with a maximum power of 15 W EIRP

Botswana (ITU Region 1): The new WRC-15 Amateur Secondary 60 m allocation of 5351.5 – 5366.5 kHz is reported by the South African Radio League (SARL) to have been released by the Botswana Communications Regulatory Authority (BOCRA) at a maximum power of 15 W EIRP.

Brazil (ITU Region 2): ANATEL, the Brazilian telecoms regulator has produced an updated band plan, which releases 60 m to their amateurs. This is the new WRC-15 Amateur Secondary 60 m allocation of 5351.5 – 5366.5 kHz with a maximum power limit of 20 W EIRP, available to Class A operators (Source: ANATEL, PP5VX)

Bulgaria (ITU Region 1): Following a proposal submitted in November 2012 by the Bulgarian national amateur radio society, BFRA, to the Bulgarian national spectrum (NRFSC) and Regulation Commission (CRC), Bulgarian radio amateurs will be permitted access to a number of new bands including a 60 m band allocation of 5250 – 5450 kHz on a Secondary basis. This has been confirmed and they are permitted all modes at 100 watts (Source: BFRA, LZ1US)

Canada (ITU Region 2): On July 28, 2022, the Canadian regulator, Innovation, Science, and Economic Development Canada (ISED) released an update to the document for Canadian Radio Amateurs: “RBR-4 – Standards for the Operation of Radio Stations in the Amateur Radio Service”. Part of the document details the release of the new WRC-15 Amateur Secondary allocation of 5351.5 - 5366.5 kHz at a maximum effective radiated power of 100 W PEP with 2.8 kHz maximum bandwidth. This is in addition to the present four 3 kHz-wide channels (see Channel Allocations entry).

Caribbean Netherlands (ITU Region 2): The following 60 m news was given by the Branch Manager / Senior Inspector, Dutch Caribbean Agentschap Telecom regulator in Bonaire: "Recently Agentschap Telecom (AT) has updated the frequency plan for Bonaire, Sint Eustatius and Saba with the addition of the 60-meter band (5351.5 – 5366.5 kHz) for amateur radio, this with a secondary status. This means that the band may be operated by A, B or C Amateurs (full licence). The band has footnote 5.133B which limits the power in the Caribbean region of the Kingdom of the Netherlands to 25 watts (EIRP)." (Source: Dutch Caribbean AT, PH2M, W8GEX, DX-World)

China (ITU Region 3): The new WRC-15 amateur 60 m band 5351.5—5366.5 kHz at 15 W EIRP became available to Chinese class B & C licensees from July 1, 2018 according to The No.46 Order of Ministry of Industry and Information Technology released on April 18, 2018.

Costa Rica (ITU Region 2): The Radio Club de Costa Rica (RCCR) reports that the latest version of The National Frequency Assignment Plan of Costa Rica was published in the country's Gazette #95 by their telecom regulator, SUTEL, on May 30, 2023. This contained the release of the new WRC-15 Amateur Secondary Allocation of 5351.5 - 5366.5 kHz at 25 W EIRP. Operation is by Superior and Intermediate Licensees. (Source: TI8AA, TI2GBB)

Croatia (ITU Region 1): On Friday, 24 November 2017, the Croatian Regulatory Authority for Network Industries (HAKOM) published in the Official gazette (Narodne Novine) No 116/2017 changes to the rules on amateur radio communications in the Republic of Croatia. Croatian radio amateurs now have access to the WRC-15 60 m amateur secondary allocation of 5351.5 – 5366.5 kHz under ITU Footnote 5.133B – i.e. with 15 W EIRP. Prior to that, in July 2010 Amateurs were given special license access to 5 MHz on an individual, experimental basis which permitted operation from 5260 – 5410 kHz on all modes, the licences being valid for 1 year. (Source:- 9A2EY, 9A5K, OK1RP, HAKOM)

Cuba (ITU Region 2): ): Faithful to their promise of a new universal 60 m amateur band at WRC-12, the Ministry of Communications of Cuba approved access to the new WRC-15 Secondary Allocation of 5351.5 to 5366.5 kHz at 25 W EIRP for Cuban Amateurs. This is in addition to the law, approved on January 20, 2014, allowing the use of the 5 MHz spectrum from 5418 to 5430 kHz, a continuous 12 kHz-wide segment. This allocation is as a secondary user as per ITU RR 4.4 regulations. The use of the amateur radio service in this segment is limited to communications within the national territory for the preparation and operation of the Emergency Organisation of the Federation of Radio Amateurs of Cuba (Cuba Footnote CUB 7)

Cyprus (ITU Region 1): The Cyprus telecom regulator, the Department of Electronic Communications, issued a gazette notice on Friday 30 June 2017 updating the national frequency table to include the new WRC-15 Amateur Secondary 60 m allocation of 5351.5 – 5366.5 kHz with a maximum power limit of 15 W EIRP.

Czech Republic (ITU Region 1): At the start of 2019, the telecoms regulator, the Czech Telecommunications Office (CTU) permitted Czech Amateurs access to the new WRC-15 60 m Amateur Secondary Allocation of 5351.5 – 5366.5 kHz at 15 W EIRP. At the same time, it was decided to discontinue the former twelve 5 MHz channels. Operators are also asked to follow IARU recommendations for 5 MHz operation. (National Frequency Allocation Table in Czech).

Denmark (ITU Region 1): Stations have as from 1 Jun 2012 been granted the spectrum 5250 – 5450 kHz, all-mode with secondary status by their regulator, the Enterprise Agency (ERST). 1 kW ERP is permitted for Category A licensees, and 100 W for Category B. Previously in 2011, Danish amateur stations had to apply for a special experimental research license for a year at a time. Prior to that they were allocated channels. (Source: the Danish ERST & EDR websites) As of January 2017 the Danish radioamateurs can use all of the spectrum from 5250 to 5450 kHz, on a secondary basis, without any further permission. Power limits are 1000 W for A-licenses and 100 W for B-licenses.

Dominican Republic (ITU Region 2): On March 4, 2020, the Executive Branch of the Dominican Republic, through decree 91–20, approved the update of the National Frequency Allocation Plan (PNAF), according to recommendations of the Dominican Institute of Telecommunications (INDOTEL). In the document, the 60 meter segment is assigned to amateur radio as follows: 5351.5 - 5366.5 kHz (5.133B) 25W EIRP. The Dominican Republic Amateur Radio Club was consulted and recommended hosting the IARU band plan.

Ecuador (ITU Region 2): The Ecuadorian telecoms regulator, ARCOTEL, has authorized operation on 5 MHz under the new WRC-15 Secondary Allocation (Source: HC2AO, ARCOTEL)

Estonia (ITU Region 1): 60 m became available on a regular basis to Estonian (ES) class A and B amateurs on 1 September 2017. The band segment and maximum allowed power are according to the ITU rule 5.133B: 5351.5–5366.5 kHz, 15 W EIRP. They also have the possibility of using the frequency segment 5370–5450 kHz with maximum power 20dBW (100 W) TX output but so far only on special permission basis and only for local rescue communications.

Eswatini (ITU Region 1): The Eswatini telecom regulator, ESCCOM (Eswatini Communications Commission) has released the new WRC-15 Amateur Secondary Allocation of 5351.5 – 5366.5 kHz with a maximum power of 15 W EIRP.

Falkland Islands (ITU Region 2): Major changes to the Falkland Islands Communications Laws have been announced by the Falkland Islands Communications Regulator. They were published in the official Falkland Islands Gazette on 11 November 2019 and came into force on 15 November 2019. One of these has resulted in the new WRC-15 60 m Secondary Allocation becoming available to all full Falklands Radio Amateurs. The allocation 5351.5 – 5366.5 kHz, with a maximum power of 25 W EIRP, has been granted for Amateur Radio operations in the islands (see p. 6 of the amateur radio conditions).

Faroe Islands (ITU Region 1): Stations have as from 1 Jun 2012 been granted the spectrum 5250 – 5450 kHz, all-mode with secondary status by their regulator, Fjarskiftiseftirlitiðthe, (FSE). 1 kW ERP is permitted for Category A licensees, and 100 W for Category B. Previously in 2011, Faroese amateur stations had to apply and pay for a special one year license. As of January 2015 the Faroese radio amateurs can use all of the spectrum from 5250 to 5450 kHz, on a secondary basis, without any further permission. Power limits are 1000 W for A-licenses and 100 W for B-licenses. D-Licenses cannot operate on 60m. The Faroe Islands are an autonomous territory of Denmark and therefore operate under the same regulator as Denmark.

Finland (ITU Region 1): On 9 December 2016, the Finnish communications authority, FICORA, issued a decision permitting access to the new WRC-15 60 m allocation for all Finnish amateur licensees. The allocation is from 5351.5 to 5366.5 kHz on a Secondary basis with a maximum power of 15 W EIRP. All modes are permitted.

France (and Territories) (ITU Region 1): From 13 February 2020, Amateurs in all French territories (and including Monaco) now have access to the new WRC-15 60 m Secondary Allocation of 5351.5 – 5366.5 kHz at a maximum power of 15 W EIRP following the publication in the French Official Journal of the order establishing it. The French national amateur radio society, REF, advocates the use of the IARU 60 m bandplan.

Germany (ITU Region 1): On 19 December 2016, the German communications authority, BNetzA, issued a decision permitting access to the new WRC-15 60 m allocation for German A class amateur licensees. The allocation is from 5351.5 to 5366.5 kHz on a Secondary basis with a maximum power of 9,14 W ERP. All modes are permitted.

Greece (ITU Region 1): A ministerial decision dated 26 February 2019 introduced a new Frequency Allocation Table, which authorizes amateur radio use of 5351.5 – 5366.5 kHz on a secondary basis.

Greenland (ITU Region 2): It has recently been reported that the Greenland 5 MHz Amateur Allocation has now been expanded to a full allocation of 5250 – 5450 kHz from the original allocation of seven 5 MHz channels (these were 5258.5, 5278.5, 5288.5, 5366.5, 5371.5, 5398.5 and 5403.5 kHz). The Telecommunications Authority has permitted USB, CW and digital modes as previously. (Source: OX3XR) Greenland is an autonomous territory of Denmark and therefore operates under the same regulator as Denmark.

Grenada (ITU Region 2): The communications regulator – the National Telecommunications Regulatory Commission (NTRC) permits 60 m operation from 5250 – 5450 kHz. Their General licensees are permitted up to 500 W PEP and Advanced licensees 1 kW PEP. Modes include USB and CW. (Source: Grenada NTRC)

Hong Kong (ITU Region 3): OFCA (Office of the Communications Authority), the Hong Kong telecommunications regulator, released the new WRC-15 60 m allocation in January 2017 to the amateur service on a Secondary basis. The allocation is 5351.5 to 5366.5 kHz with 15 W EIRP maximum power. (Source: OFCA, VR2XMC, G3PSM)

Hungary (ITU Region 1): The Hungarian telecoms regulator, NMHH (The National Media & Infocommunications Authority – Hungary) has published in the Hungarian National Gazette No.7 of 29 May 2018 an update to the National Frequency Allocation table 7/2015 on the use of frequency bands (X1.13), section 99 which initiates the WRC-15 Allocation of 5351.5 to 5366.5 kHz with 15 W EIRP maximum power. Previously special 3-month permits were available, allowing 5350–5450 kHz at 100 W, but these were discontinued in 2017. (Source: HA3FLT, MRASZ)

Iceland (ITU Region 1): On January 15, 2018, the Icelandic telecoms regulator, PFS, published updated Amateur Radio regulations which included permitting access to the new WRC-15 60 m allocation from 5351.5 to 5366.5 kHz on a Secondary basis with a maximum power of 15 W EIRP, but concluded the previous experimental licence privileges which had been current until the end of 2017. Prior to that, Amateur stations were given permission for access to 5260–5410 kHz with 100 watts EIRP which had been available by special permit.

India (ITU Region 3): The Indian Government's Telecommunications regulator has published a 2018 Update to the Indian National Frequency Plan, effective 25 October 2018, which includes a new band at 5 MHz / 60 m. This is the WRC-15 Amateur Secondary allocation of 5 351.5 – 5 366.5 kHz with a Maximum Power of 15 W EIRP

Indonesia (ITU Region 3): The Ministry of Communications and Informatics of Indonesia issued new Amateur Radio Regulations dated December 31, 2018. Included in these (p. 53) is the new WRC-15 Secondary allocation of 5351.5–5366.5 kHz with a maximum power of 15 W EIRP. It is available to top class licensees and all modes are permitted in accordance with the IARU 60 m band plan.

Israel (ITU Region 1): At the end of 2020, the Israeli telecom regulator, IMOC, the Ministry of Communications, released the new WRC-15 amateur 60 m Secondary allocation of 5351.5 – 5366.5 kHz with a maximum power limit of 25 W at the transmitter output. This replaces the previous nine 3 kHz channels which were available by individual application. The new WRC-15 allocation is only available to Advanced and General Class licensees. (4X1LT, IMOC)

Italy (ITU Region 1): The Minister of Economic Development approved, with a Decree of October 5, 2018, an update to the Italian National Frequency Distribution Plan between 0 and 3,000 GHz. Within this plan, the frequency band 5351.5 – 5366.5 kHz is also attributed to the amateur radio service with the status of a secondary service. The stations of the amateur radio service using the 5351.5 – 5366.5 kHz frequency band must not exceed the maximum equivalent isotropic power of 15 W EIRP (WRC-15).

Jamaica (ITU Region 2): In a recent update to their National Frequency Allocation Table published by regulator the Jamaican Spectrum Management Authority (SMA), the WRC-15 60 m Amateur Secondary Allocation of 5351.5 – 5366.5 kHz has been granted under ITU Footnote 5.133B, which, in the case of Jamaica, means a maximum power of 25 W EIRP. The Jamaican Amateur Radio Association (JARA) is advocating use of the new IARU Region 2 60 m bandplan.

Kazakhstan (ITU Region 1): Following a request from the Association of Amateur Radio Services in Kazakhstan (AARSK), the Republic of Kazakhstan state telecoms regulator, MIC (Ministry of Information, Communications & The Media) issued an official letter Number 16-1/1824-1 dated 22 December 2016 authorising use by Kazakhstan radio amateurs of the new WRC-15 60 m Allocation of 5351.5 – 5366.5 kHz on a Secondary basis. At this time no maximum power limit has been indicated and this will be further clarified with the Ministry by discussions with AARSK, who are also advocating use of the IARU Region 1 60 m Provisional Bandplan.

Kenya (ITU Region 1): Following a request from the Radio Society of Kenya (RSK), Kenya state radio regulator, CAK (Communications Authority Kenya) advised the RSK that a new 60 m allocation has been granted between 5275 kHz and 5450 kHz on a secondary basis. All modes are permitted with a maximum power output of 400 W PEP.

Kosovo (ITU Region 1): The new WRC-15 Amateur Secondary Allocation of 5351.5 - 5366.5 kHz at 15 W EIRP has been made available since June 30, 2023 to radio amateurs in Kosovo for Intermediate and Higher Class licensees by their telecoms regulator, ARKEP This follows a number of discussions with the national Kosovo Amateur Radio Society, SHRAK. (Source : Z61YB)

Kuwait (ITU Region 1): The Kuwaiti tele com regulator, CITRA, has released the new WRC-15 Amateur Secondary Allocation of 5351.5 – 5366.5 kHz to Kuwaiti 9K2 licensees under ITU Footnote 5.133B, which in the case of Kuwait means a maximum power of 15 W EIRP.

Kyrgyzstan (ITU Region 1): The Union of Radio Amateurs of Kyrgyz Republic (ARUKR) announced that on 4 June 2021, the Kyrgyzstan Telecommunications Regulator made the new WRC-15 Amateur Secondary Allocation of 5351.5 – 5366.5 kHz available to Kyrgyz hams at a maximum power of 100 W.

Latvia (ITU Region 1): Latvian amateurs have a new 5 MHz band following the introduction of their new amateur radio licence on August 9, 2016. Access has been allowed to the new WRC-15 60 m /5 MHz allocation 5351.5 – 5366.5 kHz – with a power of 15 W EIRP. It is subject to a narrow transmit bandwidth of 800 Hz and is permitted to Category A (i.e. top level) licence holders only.

Lesotho (ITU Region 1): Word has been confirmed via the South African Radio League (SARL) that the Lesotho telecom regulator, LCA (Lesotho Communications Authority) has released the whole of the 60 meter spectrum 5250 – 5450 kHz on a secondary, non-interference basis.

Lithuania (ITU Region 1): Lithuania telecomms -15 Secondary Allocation of 5351.5 – 5366.5 kHz at 15 W EIRP in its 2018 update to the country's Frequency Allocation Table, making it available to Lithuanian amateurs.

Luxembourg (ITU Region 1): The Radioamateurs du Luxembourg (national amateur radio society) advises that since 10 October 2016, the new WRC-15 60 m band allocation has been released for amateur radio use in Luxembourg. The update to the national frequency plan of the 3rd October, published in the Memorial (the official Luxembourg government publication) on 10 October, allows the use of 5351.5–5366.5 kHz on a secondary basis with 15 W ERP.

Malaysia (ITU Region 3): The Malay National Amateur Radio society, MARTS, reports that their regulator, MCMC, has already approved the 60m amateur secondary allocation as per WRC-15. At the moment, they are waiting for the formal paperwork to be completed before amateurs can begin to legally utilise this band. However, MCMC has granted MARTS temporary licenses that permits the use of 60m for emcomm usage as well as emcomm exercise purposes. On December 18, 2021, heavy rain caused flooding and evacuations, with subsequent loss of communications and power. MARTS activated their MDECC (MARTS Disaster and Emergency Communications Centre), with its UHF/VHF and HF network to handle emergency traffic. One of the HF frequencies in use was 5353 kHz. (Sources: MARTS, 9M2IR, IARU R3 Newsletter)

Malta (ITU Region 1): The Malta Communications Authority – the island's telecomms regulator – published its new National Frequency Plan (NFP) in April 2017. This includes the new WRC-15 60 m amateur secondary allocation of 5351.5 to 5366.5 kHz. Maximum power permitted is 15 W EIRP. (Source: MCA)

Mexico (ITU Region 2): The Mexican telecomms regulator, IFT – Instituto Federal de Telecomunicaciones, has approved amateur operation on the new WRC-15 60 m amateur secondary allocation of 5351.5–5366.5 kHz. Maximum power permitted is 20 W EIRP. (Source: IFT, XE2O, FMRE)

Montenegro (ITU Region 1): The latest update to the Montenegro National Frequency Plan (p. 37) from the country's telecomms regulator, EKIP, lists a new band at 5 MHz / 60 m, namely the WRC-15 Amateur Secondary Allocation of 5351.5–5366.5 kHz with 15 W EIRP, which has been confirmed by national society, the Montenegro Amateur Radio Pool (MARP).(Source: EKIP, 4O9TTT, MARP, W8GEX)

Namibia (ITU Region 1): On 28 October 2016, the Communications Regulatory Authority of Namibia (CRAN) published updates in the official Namibian government gazette (p. 12) which included the WRC-15 Amateur Secondary Allocation of 5351.5 to 5366.5 kHz with a maximum power of 15 W EIRP.

Netherlands (ITU Region 1): On March 28, 2017, the official gazette of The Netherlands implemented the WRC-15 decision of 5351.5 to 5366.5 kHz on a secondary basis with an EIRP of 15 W, effective April 1, 2017. This replaces the previous Article 4.4 allocation of 5350–5450 kHz at a maximum power of 100 watts PEP. As before, only amateurs with a full licence ('F' registration) are allowed to use the band (Source: Staatscourant, AT, VERON)

New Zealand (ITU Region 3):On the 15th December 2023 the Radio Spectrum Management group, a division of the governments Ministry of Business Innovation & Employment, varied the General User Radio License to include the allocation of 5.3515 to 5.3665 MHz on a secondary basis with a maximum e.i.r.p of 11.8 dBW (15.1W e.i.r.p).

Niger (ITU Region 1): The Niger telecoms regulator, ARTP (Autorité de Regulation des Telecommunications et de La Poste du Niger), permits 60 m access in the country to all Niger amateurs under the WRC-15 allocation of 5351.5 – 5366.5 kHz and its subsequent footnote. (Source: EA5GM, W8GEX)

Norway (ITU Region 1): On November 6, 2009, the band 5260 – 5410 kHz was opened for general Amateur Radio use, following initially eight channels in the 60 m band being made available for Emergency and Emergency Preparedness activities. The allocation is secondary and power is limited to 100 watts, 6 kHz maximum bandwidth. The band was one of the HF bands used in June 2011 during a communications emergency

Oman (ITU Region 1): Oman now has the WRC-15 Amateur 60 m Secondary Allocation of 5351.5–5366.5 kHz with a maximum power of 15 W EIRP. CW, SSB and Digital Modes are allowed. Formerly 5 MHz operation was in the range 5319–5349 kHz means of temporary permits in co-operation with the Royal Omani Amateur Radio Society (ROARS).(Source: ROARS)

Panama (ITU Region 2): Following AN Resolution No. 10789-Telco of December 21, 2016, which was published in Official Gazette No. 28185-A of December 27, 2016, the National Authority for Public Services (ASEP) of the Republic of Panama published their 2016 National Frequency Plan which contained the WRC-15 amateur secondary allocation of 5351.5–5366.5 kHz (p. 36). (Source: HP1AVS, ASEP, W8GEX)

Paraguay (ITU Region 2): The Paraguay telecom regulator, CONATEL, has released the WRC-15 Amateur Secondary Allocation of 5351.5 to 5366.5 kHz with a Maximum Power of 25 W EIRP. (Source: ZP4KFX, CONATEL, W8GEX)

Philippines (ITU Region 3): The Philippines Telecom Regulator, the National Telecommunications Commission, has permitted access to the new WRC-15 Amateur Secondary 60 m allocation of 5351.5–5366.5 kHz under ITU footnote 5.133B, with a maximum power limit of 15 W EIRP.

Poland (ITU Region 1): On Thursday, May 11, 2017, the Polish Government published a gazette notice amending regulations in the National Frequency Allocation Table. Polish amateurs are now permitted access to the WRC-15 60 m amateur Secondary allocation of 5351.5–5366.5 kHz under ITU Footnote 5.133B with 15 W EIRP. According to the gazette notice, these regulations come into force 14 days following its publication, so are effective from May 26, 2017.

Portugal, including the Azores Islands (ITU Region 1): In November 2016, the telecommunications regulator, ANACOM, permitted 5 MHz operation on the new WRC-15 60 m allocation 5351.5–5366.5 kHz, 15 W EIRP (Source CT1EEB)

Republic of Ireland (ITU Region 1): Irish regulator ComReg published on 22 May 2023 an amended version of the Amateur Station Guidelines in Document ComReg 09/45 R5.The main revision is that the WRC-15 band of 5351.5 to 5366.5 kHz has been added with immediate effect on a secondary basis The power is 15 watts PEP (12 dBW) measured at the output of the transmitter or amplifier. All modes including digimodes may be used. The national society, IRTS, recommends that USB be used for voice as has been the convention on this band and as used by the primary user and that the IARU band plan be used. This allocation does not affect the availability of the existing channels centred on 5280, 5300, 5332, 5348, 5400 and 5405 kHz. (Sources; ComReg, EI7CD, Ei7GL) See also Channel entry.

Romania (ITU Region 1): An update to the Romanian National Frequency Table published in the country's Official Gazette and dated 7 May 2020 lists the full WRC-15 60 m Amateur Secondary Allocation of 5351.5 - 5366.5 kHz under ITU regulation 5.133B, meaning a maximum power of 15W EIRP (p. 30). Previously it had been limited to the 3 kHz-wide 5363.5–5366.5 kHz slot from 8 April 2016.

Samoa (ITU Region 3): Atsuo Sakuma, 5W1SA, reports that on his yearly licence renewal, operative 26 August 2021, the Samoan 60 m Amateur Secondary Allocation has been changed to that of the WRC-15 Allocation of 5351.5 – 5366.5 kHz at 15W Maximum EIRP. Previously, Atsuo became the first resident operator on the island to be issued with a special 5 MHz permission by the Samoan telecomms regulator, OoTR (Office Of The Regulator), enabling him to operate over the frequency band 5250–5450 kHz. Although occasional 60 m permissions have been available to visitors since 2011, these had generally been the 5 US channels. The permanent amateur population in Samoa has been low in numbers and currently Atsuo is the only resident licensed operator. In April 2013, a dialogue commenced between the regulator and Atsuo which eventually resulted in a band rather than purely a channelized allocation. He was permitted 100 W, with no other restrictions.

Senegal (ITU Region 1): Yves F5PRU / 6W1TA in Senegal has been informed by ARTP, the Senegalese Telecom Regulatory Authority, that the new WRC-15 Amateur Secondary Allocation 5351.5 – 5366.5 kHz is now allowed in the country. The IARU Region 1 bandplan should be used with a maximum power limit available of 15 W EIRP.

Slovakia (ITU Region 1): In 2017, Slovak amateurs were permitted access to the new WRC-15 60 m allocation from 5351.5 to 5366.5 kHz on a Secondary basis with a maximum power of 15 W EIRP. Prior to that, radio amateurs were allowed access to a band from 5258.5 kHz to 5410 kHz for experimental purposes on a non-interference basis by their Telecommunications Regulatory Authority in August 2011, having previously been permitted a single channel centred on 5260 kHz. This was as a result of negotiations with the Slovakia Amateur Radio Association and their ARES (Amateur Radio Emergency Service).

Slovenia (ITU Region 1): Following updated national legislation related to the radio amateur service, on July 14, 2018, the Slovenian telecoms regulator, AKOS, gave full permission for use of the 60 m band in Slovenia. The allocation is the WRC-15 Secondary allocation from 5351.5 to 5366.5 kHz with 15 W EIRP and is available to all Slovenian Class A operators. Previously in 2017 it had been available on a temporary three-month licence basis. Use of the IARU Region 1 60 m bandplan is recommended. (Source: ZRS, DF5JL, S50A, W8GEX)

Somalia (ITU Region 1): The Somali Ministry of Information & Communication Technology permits non-channelized 5 MHz / 60-meter operation. Upper sideband (USB) must be used and the allocation is 5060–5450 kHz. All modes are allowed and the maximum power permitted is 3 kW on a non-interference basis.

South Africa (ITU Region 1): On Friday 25 May 2018 South African regulator ICASA published the National Radio Frequency Plan 2018 in which amateur radio was allocated 100 kHz on a shared basis in the 60-meter band. The spectrum 5350–5450 kHz is now available to all licensed South African radio amateurs on a shared non-interference basis, with a power limit of 100 W EIRP. The Council of the South African Radio League has produced a 60 m band plan using Recommendation LA17_C4_REC_02 from the 2017 IARU Region 1 General Conference as a basis. In addition, the channel 5290 kHz has been allocated for WSPR beacons deployed in the SARL 5 MHz Propagation Research project and members can continue to use this frequency. See also Channel Allocations.

Spain (ITU Region 1): On 27 October 2017, the Spanish official government gazette, the Boletín Oficial del Estado (BOE), published news of the new National Frequency Allocation Chart (CNAF p. 103234) which includes the new global WRC-15 60 m secondary allocation of 5351.5–5366.5 kHz. All modes are permitted with a maximum power of 15 W EIRP in a 3 kHz bandwidth.

Sweden (ITU Region 1): The Swedish Post & Telecom (PTS) regulator has made available the WRC-15 Secondary Allocation of 5351.5–5366.5 kHz on November 1, 2018. Maximum power permitted is 15 W EIRP. This replaces the previous four 3 kHz segments of 5310, 5320, 5380 and 5390 kHz and the temporary 5351.5–5366.5 kHz allocation permits that been used during the past years which now have expired. An administration fee is no longer required. The first experimental permits were issued at the beginning of 2013. (Sources: SM7CFU, SM7DLK, SM6YOR, SMØTSC, SM6CNN, OK1RP, IARU Reg. 1 website, PTS )

Switzerland, including Liechtenstein (ITU Region 1): Starting on Jan 1, 2017, Switzerland has 60 m / 5 MHz privileges. WRC-15 conditions apply – 15 W EIRP and frequencies available: 5351.5–5354.0 kHz (CW, small-bandwidth modes); 5354.0–5366.0 kHz (all modes, USB for SSB); 5366.0–5366.5 kHz (small-bandwidth modes, weak-signal).

Trinidad and Tobago (ITU Region 2): The band 5250–5450 kHz is allocated on a secondary basis to the Amateur service. Maximum output power is 1.5 kW (Source: 9Y4NED)

Turkey (ITU Region 1): Turkey's telecom regulator, BTK, in a government gazette notice of 29 November 2018, released the new WRC-15 60 m Secondary allocation of 5351.5–5366.5 kHz with a power limit of 15 W EIRP. All modes are allowed. (Source: TA4ED, BTK, W8GEX)

United Arab Emirates (ITU Region 1): Amateurs in the United Arab Emirates (UAE) have access to 60 m. The UAE National Frequency Plan published by the national regulator, TRA – The Telecommunications Regulatory Authority, shows the WRC-15 Secondary allocation of 5351.5 to 5366.5 kHz together with ITU footnote 5.133B which indicates that the maximum power permitted is 15 W EIRP. (Source: TRA, A65DR, W8GEX)

Uruguay (ITU Region 2): On February 16, 2017, the Uruguay telecommunications regulator, URSEC (Unidad Reguladora de Servicios de Comunicaciones) published new amateur radio regulations (Resolución No 026/2017), effective from Feb 1 2017, which included the allocation on a Secondary basis of 5351.5 to 5366.5 kHz to the amateur service for Superior (A1) only licensees with maximum power permitted of 25 W EIRP. Modes are as follows: 5351.5–5354.0 kHz (CW and digimodes); 5354.0–5366.0 kHz (all modes, USB for SSB); 5366.0–366.5 kHz (CW and digimodes). (Source: URSEC)

Uzbekistan (ITU Region 1): Information comes from Fedor, UK9AA, of the Radio Amateurs of Uzbekistan that permission has been received for Category 1 Uzbek licensees to operate in the new WRC-15 Amateur 60 m Secondary Allocation of 5351.5 – 5366.5 kHz with a Maximum Power of 100 W.

== Countries with block allocations ==
Some administrations are unable to allow a full band allocation, but are prepared to provide additional frequencies other than dedicated channels. In such cases, blocks of frequencies may be allocated.

North Macedonia (ITU Region 1) RSM - Radioamaterski Sojuz na Makedonija, the Macedonian national amateur radio society, has been involved in discussions with their national telecommunications regulator, AEC – the Agency for Electronic Communications to achieve an amateur allocation in the 5 MHz region. Commencing April 2014, AEC has issued permission for 14 mostly 5 kHz-wide blocks between 5250 and 5450 kHz with 100 W voice, CW, and data. This current permission is granted until 30 January 2017. RSM had originally requested permission for a small group of dedicated radio amateurs "with good experience", but as the permission has been given to RSM as an organisation, then this may possibly be modified in the future in the light of evidence accrued. (Source: Z35BY, Z32TO, RSM)

United Kingdom (ITU Region 1) The UK was allocated 11 frequency blocks of varying bandwidths in January 2013. Full information is contained in the United Kingdom entry above.

== Countries with channel allocations ==
Global communication is possible during grey line and night time ionospheric conditions with reports of 70 plus countries having been worked from the UK alone.

In all, radio amateurs from approximately 100 countries have been active on 5 MHz at one time or another since the availability of the band to amateur radio.

Radio amateurs from many countries that do not have transmit access to 60 m monitor the band and post their reports of stations heard on activity spotting pages such as the DXWatch 60 m page, 60 Meter Activity Map and similar sites, together with the Reverse Beacon Network 60 m page which indicates current CW activity on the band.

It is quite likely that not all countries' allocations will line up to allow single frequency contacts to be made, in which case split-frequency operation would appear the optimum solution to allow the parties concerned to remain within their legally-allotted frequency limits (presuming of course that the parties' licenses permit this type of split-frequency operation)

Bahrain (ITU Region 1): In 2016 amateurs were permitted access to the new channel assignments 5357.5 and 5363.5 kHz on a Secondary basis with a maximum power of 15 W EIRP; Prior to that, General Class licensees (all 'A9' prefixed stations) were authorized to use two specific 3.0 kHz channel assignments with center frequencies 5373 kHz and 5405 kHz on a secondary non interference basis for propagation experiments with a maximum mean power not exceeding 27 dBW (500 watts).

Canada (ITU Region 2): On July 28, 2022, the Canadian regulator, Innovation Science and Economic Development Canada (ISED) released an update to the document for Canadian Radio Amateurs: “RBR-4 – Standards for the Operation of Radio Stations in the Amateur Radio Service”. Part of the document details the release of the new WRC-15 Amateur Secondary allocation of 5351.5 - 5366.5 kHz at a maximum effective radiated power of 100 W PEP with 2.8 kHz maximum bandwidth. This is in addition to the present four 3 kHz-wide channels (see Band Allocations entry). On Wednesday 22 January 2014, the Canadian regulator, Industry Canada (IC) released a decision to allow amateur radio operators to use the 5332 kHz, 5348 kHz, 5358.5 kHz, 5373 kHz, and 5405 kHz (channel centre) frequencies on a no-interference, no-protection basis, 2.8 kHz bandwidth, same modes as U.S., 100 W PEP maximum power. These are the same channels, modes and criteria as those available to US operators on 5 MHz and are as the result of the official IC consultation held earlier in Summer 2012. Prior to this Canadian Amateurs were allowed at the beginning of April 2012 to apply for special interim 5 MHz / 60 m development licences under the VX9 callsign series by their regulator, Industry Canada. This provided for the same channels and facilities accorded to US licensees. Following discussions with the Canadian national amateur radio society – Radio Amateurs of Canada (RAC) and the implementation of the US FCC new 60 m rules in March 2012, Industry Canada (IC) issued a consultation notice for Canadian radio amateurs in the government Canada Gazette on May 12, 2012. It proposed the American 60 m channels and conditions, plus an extra one at 5329 kHz for Canadian domestic use only (at the request of RAC), making a total of six channels. Canadian amateurs had until 12 June 2012 to comment and responses were published on the Industry Canada website on 22 June 2012. At the successful conclusion of this process IC intended to permit general availability of these 5 MHz / 60 m channels to Canadian amateurs. In the meantime, amateurs were invited to apply to IC for a special interim 5 MHz / 60 m developmental licence in order to have the opportunity of gaining early access to these frequencies. Amateurs holding the Basic + (with Honours) or the Advanced Certificate were eligible for licensing on these frequencies. Before this, 5 MHz / 60 m activity from Canada had been on a special permission, limited time basis on specified frequencies. This had originated as early as 2002.

Cayman Islands (ITU Region 2): 60 m authorizations became effective on March 29, 2010, and in common with other amateur licensing aspects on the Islands, follow the US 5 MHz allocation and conditions (Source: ZF1EJ)

Dominica (ITU Region 2): The Dominica National Telecommunications Regulator has permitted Amateur operation on five 3 kHz-wide channels on 5 MHz. These are – 5330.5, 5346.5, 5355.5, 5371.5 and 5403.5 kHz at 50 W PEP voice (SSB). These are available to General and Advanced licensees only. (Source: ECTEL, Dominica NTRC)

Honduras (ITU Region 2): The National Telecommunications Commission (CONATEL) allows general, advanced and superior class licenses to operate on five center frequencies (5332, 5348, 5368, 5373, and 5405 kHz), in USB, with an Effective Radiated Power of 50 watts. By virtue of Resolution NR013/15 dated 30 September 2015, CONATEL upgraded the maximum power level to 100 W ERP, changed the 5368 kHz to 5358.5 kHz and added the following modes – USB Voice (2K80J3E), Data (2K80J2D), RTTY (60H0J2B) and CW (150HA1A). This is in line with earlier US changes.

Republic of Ireland (ITU Region 1): The Irish regulator, ComReg, published on 22 December 2016 an amended version of the Amateur Station Guidelines Document ComReg 09/45R2. The main revision is that the WRC-15 band of 5351.5 to 5366.5 kHz has been released with immediate effect on a secondary basis. Additionally, the previous six 3 kHz-wide channels 5280, 5300, 5332, 5348, 5400 and 5405 kHz (channel centre frequencies) have now been subsumed into the main licence, therefore there is no longer any need to purchase a special licence from ComReg, as had formerly been the case for extra channels. SSB (USB), CW and Phase Modulation is permitted with a maximum power limit of 200 W (23 dBW) on a Secondary, non-interference basis. Communications with non-Amateur stations (i.e. UK military cadet stations) is not permitted. Back in early January 2013, the regulator, ComReg, announced that those Irish amateurs who had taken up the original 5 MHz concession could apply for three more 3 kHz-wide channels, 5300, 5332 and 5348 kHz by purchasing a special licence from ComReg. This was in addition to the earlier three 3 kHz-wide channels allowed, 5400 5280 and 5405 kHz, when stations first received permission to operate experimentally on the band on October 17, 2008 (Source: IRTS News) See also Band entry.

South Africa (ITU Region 1): On Friday 25 May 2018 South African regulator ICASA published the National Radio Frequency Plan 2018 in which amateur radio was allocated 100 kHz on a shared basis in the 60-meter band. The spectrum 5350 to 5450 kHz is now available to all licensed South African radio amateurs on a shared non-interference basis, with a power limit of 100 W EIRP. In addition, the channel 5290 kHz has been allocated for WSPR beacons deployed in the SARL 5 MHz Propagation Research project and members can continue to use this frequency. See also Band Allocations.

St. Kitts and Nevis (ITU Region 2): In September 2015, General and Advanced Class amateurs received permission to operate on 5 MHz on a Secondary basis. The channels allocated are the same as those used by the US, with 50 W Max. ERP, SSB only. (Source: ECTEL – Eastern Caribbean Telecommunications Authority)

St. Lucia (ITU Region 2): Amateurs have received permission to operate on 5 MHz on a Secondary basis. The channels allocated are the same as those used by the US, with 50 W maximum ERP, SSB only. (Source: St. Lucia National Telecommunications Regulatory Commission, 'Technical Standards for Amateur Radio Service' document)

== Special Individual Permits ==
Whilst not immediately in a position to sanction 60m Amateur operation as a whole, some countries may be prepared to consider special individual permits under certain conditions to gauge compatibility with the amateur service in their 5 MHz spectrum. One such country is Tajikistan, which has issued a permit to experienced operator Nodir, EY8MM to operate between 5260 and 5410 kHz with a power limit of 100 W. Previous recipients of Special Individual Permits include Fedor, UK9AA, who was issued one by Uzbekistan. Uzbekistan amateurs have now recently been allowed access to the WRC-15 60m Amateur Allocation (see Band entry)

== Occasional permissions ==
Whilst most of the 60-meter operations listed in this article are either on a permanent secondary or experimental period basis, there are occasions when access is granted either on a one-off very limited time frame or for specific dates and times.

Other authorized 5 MHz operations have been reported such as Ascension Island, Colombia, Fiji, Ghana, Kiribati and Russia. Some Amateur Radio DXpeditions have been permitted temporary access to 5 MHz.

== Emergencies only ==
In certain countries, Amateur access to frequencies in 5 MHz is on an emergency or search & rescue basis only. In addition, Amateur call signs may not always be used, nor Amateur equipment. Currently these countries are :-

- Australia (ITU Region 3): It has been requested by the authorities to make clear that the 5 MHz frequencies used by WICEN (Wireless Institute of Australia Civil Emergency Network) are for emergencies and related exercises. It is NOT an amateur allocation. Non-amateur callsigns, AXF404, AXF405 and VXE580 are used together with ACMA (Australian Communications & Media Authority) type-approved radio equipment such as the commercial HF SSB transceivers (e.g., Codan or Barrett) normally used for outback communications in the VKS737 Australian HF network – which serves remote travelers. VKE580 is also used by Amateur Radio New South Wales to relay the VK1WIA National and local VK2WI news, on Sundays at 10am local time.
- New Zealand (ITU Region 3): Two 5 MHz frequencies have been assigned for emergency use only. They are NOT Amateur frequencies and are available only for AREC operations (the Amateur Radio Emergency Communications section of the NZ National Amateur Radio Society NZART) courtesy of the NZ Defence Force. Special AREC Callsigns must be used (source: NZART website).
- USA – State of Alaska (ITU Region 2): In addition to previously mentioned USA 60 m Amateur channels, the frequency 5167.5 kHz USB is available for emergency communications within the state of Alaska. The maximum power permitted is 150 watts peak envelope power (PEP). All stations operating on this frequency must be located in or within 50 nautical miles (93 kilometres) of the State of Alaska. and it may be used "for tests and training drills necessary to ensure the establishment, operation, and maintenance of emergency communication systems."

== Frequency lists ==
NIB = Non-Interference Basis

Bold = Beacons currently active

Hash = Allocation not active until 30 days after publication in The Federal Register

Italics = Frequency not operational at this specific time or due to come on stream after a given period of time has elapsed.

* New ITU WRC-15 Allocation

=== Beacons ===
Frequency	Country	Callsign	Grid-square	Notes
5195.0 kHz	Germany	DRA5	JO44vo	Propagation information beacon. CW/PSK31/RTTY. Transmits: 0400–2200 UTC Summertime, 0500–2300 UTC Wintertime. See 'Propagation Beacons'.
5205.25 kHz	Luxembourg	LX0HF	JN39dr	5 W EIRP. Continuous. Carrier with callsign identification at one minute intervals.
5288.8 kHz	Croatia	9A5ADI/B	JN95jg	100 mW. Continuous. 10 seconds tone, v v v, callsign, power, locator, room temperature and atmospheric pressure.
5289.5 kHz	Denmark	OV1BCN	JO55si	Personal Beacon, H;xx +04 minutes. USB/CW/MT63 (CW – 5290.5 kHz. PWR.Lvl. 30/10/0.3 W.) (Auto response PSKR 500 /FLarq / fc= 5290,5 kHz.) - NOT ACTIVE AS OF QRZ.COM INFO Updt.081524.
5290.0 kHz	South Africa	ZS6SRL	KG33wv	This beacon is the main beacon for the South African Amateur Radio League located at SARL HQ in Johannesburg. The beacon and a number of other South African stations are running WSPR mode for experimental purposes. (WSPR is configured as Dial Freq USB 5287.2 kHz TX Freq 5288.7 kHz, which is within the channel allocation)
5290.0 kHz	South Africa	ZS1OA	JF95fx	This is a permanent WSPR beacon located at Cape Town.
5291.0 kHz	Switzerland	HB9AW	JN47be	Transmits sequentially on the hour + every 5 minutes. Stepped power levels. More Info at http://www.hb9aw.ch/

=== Band allocations ===
Frequency Band	Country	Notes
5351.5–5366.5 kHz	Andorra	Secondary, CW & USB, maximum 15 W EIRP, 5 kHz maximum bandwidth*
5351.5–5366.5 kHz	Argentina	Secondary, maximum 25 W EIRP*
5351.5–5366.5 kHz	Austria	Secondary, 15 W EIRP* CEPT Class 1 licensees
5330.0–5406.0 kHz	Bahamas	Secondary
5351.5–5366.5 kHz	Bahamas	Secondary, maximum 25 W EIRP*
5250.0–5310.0 kHz	Bangladesh	Secondary, All Modes, NIB, General
5332.0–5405.0 kHz	Barbados	USB, 100 W PEP
5351.5–5366.5 kHz	Belarus	Secondary, SSB, CW, digital, 50 W, Class A licensees*
5351.5–5366.5 kHz	Belgium	All modes, 15 W EIRP, Class A (HAREC) licensees*
5351.5–5366.5 kHz	Belize	Secondary, 25 W EIRP*
5351.5–5366.5 kHz	Bosnia & Herzegovina	Secondary, 15 W EIRP*
5351.5–5366.5 kHz	Botswana	Secondary, 15 W EIRP*
5351.5–5366.5 kHz	Brazil	Secondary, 20 W EIRP. Class A licencees
5250.0–5450.0 kHz	Bulgaria	Secondary, all modes, 100 W
5351.5–5366.5 kHz	Canada	Secondary, 100 W ERP, 2.8 kHz max. bandwidth. See also Channel Allocations*
5351.5–5366.5 kHz	Caribbean Netherlands	Secondary, 25 W EIRP, Classes A, B & C (Full) licensees*
5351.5–5366.5 kHz	China	Secondary, 15 W EIRP, Classes B & C licensees*
5351.5-5366.5 kHz	Costa Rica	Secondary, 25 W EIRP* Intermediate and Superior Licence classes
5351.5–5366.5 kHz	Croatia	Secondary 15 W EIRP*
5351.5–5366.5 kHz	Cuba	Secondary, 25 W EIRP*
5418.0–5430.0 kHz	Cuba	USB, CW, digital (PSK31/63) Novices 10 W, others 50 W, emergencies 100 W. The use of the amateur radio service in this segment is limited to communications within the national territory for the preparation and operation of the Emergency Organisation of the Federation of Radio Amateurs of Cuba (Cuba Footnote CUB 7)
5351.5–5366.5 kHz	Cyprus	Secondary 15 W EIRP*
5351.5–5366.5 kHz	Czech Republic	Secondary 15 W EIRP*
5250.0–5450.0 kHz	Denmark including The Faeroe Islands	Secondary, all modes, 1 kW ERP Category 'A' / 100 W Category 'B' Licence
5351.5–5366.5 kHz	Dominican Republic	Secondary, 25 W EIRP*
5351.5–5366.5 kHz	Ecuador	Secondary, 25 W EIRP*
5351.5–5366.5 kHz	Estonia	Secondary, 15 W EIRP, all modes, A & B licensees*
5370.0–5450.0 kHz	Estonia	Special permission local rescue, 100 W
5351.5–5366.5 kHz	Eswatini	Secondary, 15 W EIRP*
5351.5–5366.5 kHz	Falkland Islands	Secondary, 25 W EIRP*
5351.5–5366.5 kHz	Finland	Secondary, 15 W EIRP, all modes, all licensees*
5351.5–5366.5 kHz	France & Territories (and including Monaco)	Secondary, 15 W EIRP*
5351.5–5366.5 kHz	Germany	Secondary, all modes, 9,14 W ERP, Class A (HAREC) licensees*
5351.5–5366.5 kHz	Greece	Secondary 15 W EIRP*
5250.0–5450.0 kHz	Greenland	Secondary, 100 W, USB, CW and digital modes
5250.0–5450.0 kHz	Grenada	USB and CW, 1 kW PEP Advanced Class / 500 W General Class
5351.5–5366.5 kHz	Hong Kong	Secondary, 15 W EIRP*
5351.5–5366.5 kHz	Hungary	Secondary, 15 W EIRP*
5351.5–5366.5 kHz	Iceland	Secondary 15 W EIRP*
5351.5–5366.5 kHz	India	Secondary, 15 W EIRP*
5351.5–5366.5 kHz	Indonesia	Secondary, 15 W EIRP, top class of licensee*
5351.5–5366.5 kHz	Israel	Secondary, 25 W at transmitter output*
5351.5–5366.5 kHz	Italy	Secondary, 15 W EIRP*
5351.5–5366.5 kHz	Jamaica	Secondary, 25 W EIRP*
5351.5–5366.5 kHz	Kazakhstan	Secondary*
5275.0–5450.0 kHz	Kenya	Secondary, all modes, maximum 400 W PEP
5351.5–5366.5 kHz	Kosovo	Secondary, 15 W EIRP* Intermediate and Higher Licence Classes
5351.5–5366.5 kHz	Kuwait	Secondary, 9K2 licensees, 15 W EIRP*
5351.5–5366.5 kHz	Kyrgyzstan	Secondary, 100 W*
5351.5–5366.5 kHz	Latvia	Secondary, 15 W EIRP, Category A licensees, 800 Hz bandwidth*
5250–5450 kHz	Lesotho	Secondary, NIB
5351.5–5366.5 kHz	Lithuania	Secondary, 15 W EIRP*
5351.5–5366.5 kHz	Luxembourg	Secondary, 15 W ERP*
5351.5–5366.5 kHz	Malaysia	Secondary, 15 W EIRP* Emcomm & Related Exercises Only until further notice
5351.5–5366.5 kHz	Malta	Secondary, 15 W EIRP*
5351.5–5366.5 kHz	Mexico	Secondary, 20 W EIRP*
5351.5–5366.5 kHz	Montenegro	Secondary, 15 W EIRP*
5351.5–5366.5 kHz	Namibia	Secondary, 15 W EIRP*
5351.5–5366.5 kHz	Netherlands	Secondary, 15 W EIRP, Full ('F-registration') Licensees*
5351.5–5366.5 kHz	New Zealand	Secondary, 15 W EIRP*
5351.5–5366.5 kHz	Niger	Secondary*
5260.0–5410.0 kHz	Norway	Secondary, 100 W, 6 kHz maximum bandwidth
5351.5–5366.5 kHz	Oman	Secondary, CW, SSB and digital modes, 15 W EIRP*
5351.5–5366.5 kHz	Panama	Secondary*
5351.5–5366.5 kHz	Paraguay	Secondary, 25 W EIRP*
5351.5–5366.5 kHz	Philippines	Secondary, 15 W EIRP*
5351.5–5366.5 kHz	Poland	Secondary, 15 W EIRP*.
5351.5–5366.5 kHz	Portugal including The Azores Islands	Secondary, A1A & J3E*
5351.5–5366.5 kHz	Republic of Ireland	Secondary, 15 W (12 dbW) PEP, all modes (including digimodes)* See Channel Entry
5351.5–5366.5 kHz	Romania	Secondary, 15 W EIRP*
5351.5–5366.5 kHz	Samoa	Secondary, 15 W EIRP*
5351.5–5366.5 kHz	Senegal	Secondary, 15 W EIRP*
5351.5–5366.5 kHz	Slovakia	Secondary, 15 W EIRP*
5351.5–5366.5 kHz	Slovenia	Secondary, 15 W EIRP, Class A operators*
5060.0–5450.0 kHz	Somalia	NIB, all modes (USB for SSB), 3 kW
5350.0–5450.0 kHz	South Africa	Secondary, all modes, 100 W EIRP
5351.5–5366.5 kHz	Spain	Secondary, 15 W EIRP, all modes, 3 kHz maximum bandwidth*
5351.5–5366.5 kHz	Sweden	Secondary, 15 W EIRP, 3 kHz maximum bandwidth*
5351.5–5366.5 kHz	Switzerland, including Liechtenstein	Secondary, 15 W EIRP*
5250.0–5450.0 kHz	Trinidad and Tobago	Secondary, 1.5 kW
5351.5–5366.5 kHz	Turkey	Secondary, all modes, 15 W EIRP*
5351.5–5366.5 kHz	United Arab Emirates	Secondary, 15 W EIRP*
5351.5–5366.5 kHz	United States	Secondary, 9.15 W ERP, (15 W EIRP*) # See US Text Entry
5351.5–5366.5 kHz	Uruguay	Secondary, 25 W EIRP Superior (A1) Only*
5351.5–5366.5 kHz	Uzbekistan	Secondary, 100 W Category 1 Licensees Only*

=== Block allocations ===
Country	From	To	Width	Notes
North Macedonia	5250.0 kHz	5254.0 kHz	4.0 kHz	100 W voice, CW and data
North Macedonia	5258.0 kHz	5263.0 kHz	5.0 kHz	100 W voice, CW and data
North Macedonia	5285.0 kHz	5290.0 kHz	5.0 kHz	100 W voice, CW and data
North Macedonia	5303.0 kHz	5308.0 kHz	5.0 kHz	100 W voice, CW and data
North Macedonia	5312.0 kHz	5317.0 kHz	5.0 kHz	100 W voice, CW and data
North Macedonia	5321.0 kHz	5326.0 kHz	5.0 kHz	100 W voice, CW and data
North Macedonia	5330.0 kHz	5335.0 kHz	5.0 kHz	100 W voice, CW and data
North Macedonia	5357.0 kHz	5362.0 kHz	5.0 kHz	100 W voice, CW and data
North Macedonia	5366.0 kHz	5371.0 kHz	5.0 kHz	100 W voice, CW and data
North Macedonia	5384.0 kHz	5389.0 kHz	5.0 kHz	100 W voice, CW and data
North Macedonia	5402.0 kHz	5407.0 kHz	5.0 kHz	100 W voice, CW and data
North Macedonia	5411.0 kHz	5416.0 kHz	5.0 kHz	100 W voice, CW and data
North Macedonia	5420.0 kHz	5425.0 kHz	5.0 kHz	100 W voice, CW and data
North Macedonia	5429.0 kHz	5434.0 kHz	5.0 kHz	100 W voice, CW and data
United Kingdom	5258.5 kHz	5264.0 kHz	5.5 kHz	100 W PEP (200 W EIRP), max. bandwidth 6 kHz, max. ant. height 20 m AGL, all modes
United Kingdom	5276.0 kHz	5284.0 kHz	8 kHz	100 W PEP (200 W EIRP), max. bandwidth 6 kHz, max. ant. height 20 m AGL, all modes
United Kingdom	5288.5 kHz	5292.0 kHz	3.5 kHz	100 W PEP (200 W EIRP), max. bandwidth 6 kHz, max. ant. height 20 m AGL, all modes
United Kingdom	5298.0 kHz	5307.0 kHz	9 kHz	100 W PEP (200 W EIRP), max. bandwidth 6 kHz, max. ant. height 20 m AGL, all modes
United Kingdom	5313.0 kHz	5323.0 kHz	10 kHz	100 W PEP (200 W EIRP), max. bandwidth 6 kHz, max. ant. height 20 m AGL, all modes
United Kingdom	5333.0 kHz	5338.0 kHz	5 kHz	100 W PEP (200 W EIRP), max. bandwidth 6 kHz, max. ant. height 20 m AGL, all modes
United Kingdom	5354.0 kHz	5358.0 kHz	4 kHz	100 W PEP (200 W EIRP), max. bandwidth 6 kHz, max. ant. height 20 m AGL, all modes
United Kingdom	5362.0 kHz	5374.5 kHz	12.5 kHz	100 W PEP (200 W EIRP), max. bandwidth 6 kHz, max. ant. height 20 m AGL, all modes
United Kingdom	5378.0 kHz	5382.0 kHz	4 kHz	100 W PEP (200 W EIRP), max. bandwidth 6 kHz, max. ant. height 20 m AGL, all modes
United Kingdom	5395.0 kHz	5401.5 kHz	6.5 kHz	100 W PEP (200 W EIRP), max. bandwidth 6 kHz, max. ant. height 20 m AGL, all modes
United Kingdom	5403.5 kHz	5406.5 kHz	3 kHz	100 W PEP (200 W EIRP), max. bandwidth 6 kHz, max. ant. height 20 m AGL, all modes

=== Channel allocations ===
Frequency	Country	Notes
5357.5 kHz	Bahrain	15 watts (within WRC-15 allocation)
5363.5 kHz	Bahrain	15 watts (within WRC-15 allocation)
5330.5 kHz	Canada	As current US 5 MHz allocation and conditions + WRC-15; See Band Allocation -
5346.5 kHz	Canada	As current US 5 MHz allocation and conditions + WRC-15; See Band Allocation
5357.0 kHz	Canada	As current US 5 MHz allocation and conditions + WRC-15; See Band Allocation
5371.5 kHz	Canada	As current US 5 MHz allocation and conditions + WRC-15; See Band Allocation
5403.5 kHz	Canada	As current US 5 MHz allocation and conditions + WRC-15; See Band Allocation
5330.5 kHz	Cayman Islands	As current US 5 MHz allocation and conditions
5346.5 kHz	Cayman Islands	As current US 5 MHz allocation and conditions
5357.0 kHz	Cayman Islands	As current US 5 MHz allocation and conditions
5371.5 kHz	Cayman Islands	As current US 5 MHz allocation and conditions
5403.5 kHz	Cayman Islands	As current US 5 MHz allocation and conditions
5330.5 kHz	Dominica	50 W PEP, voice (SSB), General and Advanced licensees only
5346.5 kHz	Dominica	50 W PEP, voice (SSB), General and Advanced licensees only
5355.5 kHz	Dominica	50 W PEP, voice (SSB), General and Advanced licensees only
5371.5 kHz	Dominica	50 W PEP, voice (SSB), General and Advanced licensees only
5403.5 kHz	Dominica	50 W PEP, voice (SSB), General and Advanced licensees only
5330.5 kHz	Honduras	USB voice, data, RTTY, CW, 100 W PEP ERP
5346.5 kHz	Honduras	USB voice, data, RTTY, CW, 100 W PEP ERP
5357.0 kHz	Honduras	USB voice, data, RTTY, CW, 100 W PEP ERP
5371.5 kHz	Honduras	USB voice, data, RTTY, CW, 100 W PEP ERP
5403.5 kHz	Honduras	USB voice, data, RTTY, CW, 100 W PEP ERP
5278.5 kHz	Republic of Ireland	200 W PEP USB, CW and digital modes. See Band Entry
5298.5 kHz	Republic of Ireland	200 W PEP USB, CW and digital modes. See Band Entry
5330.5 kHz	Republic of Ireland	200 W PEP USB, CW and digital modes. See Band Entry
5346.5 kHz	Republic of Ireland	200 W PEP USB, CW and digital modes. See Band Entry
5398.5 kHz	Republic of Ireland	200 W PEP USB, CW and digital modes. See Band Entry
5403.5 kHz	Republic of Ireland	200 W PEP USB, CW and digital modes. See Band Entry
5288.5 kHz	South Africa	15 W EIRP, propagation experiments only
5330.5 kHz	Saint Kitts & Nevis	As current US 5 MHz allocation, SSB, 50 W PEP, General and Advanced Class
5346.5 kHz	St. Kitts & Nevis	As current US 5 MHz allocation, SSB, 50 W PEP, General and Advanced Class
5357.0 kHz	St. Kitts & Nevis	As current US 5 MHz allocation, SSB, 50 W PEP, General and Advanced Class
5371.5 kHz	St. Kitts & Nevis	As current US 5 MHz allocation, SSB, 50 W PEP, General and Advanced Class
5403.5 kHz	St. Kitts & Nevis	As current US 5 MHz allocation, SSB, 50 W PEP, General and Advanced Class
5330.5 kHz	Saint Lucia	As current US 5 MHz allocation
5346.5 kHz	St. Lucia	As current US 5 MHz allocation
5357.0 kHz	St. Lucia	As current US 5 MHz allocation
5371.5 kHz	St. Lucia	As current US 5 MHz allocation
5403.5 kHz	St. Lucia	As current US 5 MHz allocation
5167.5 kHz	United States	For emergency, test and training drill use in Alaska only
5330.5 kHz	United States	USB, CW, RTTY, data, 100 W PEP ERP
5346.5 kHz	United States	USB, CW, RTTY, data, 100 W PEP ERP
5357.0 kHz	United States	USB, CW, RTTY, data, Subsumed into WRC-15 Allocation at 9.15 W PEP ERP
5371.5 kHz	United States	USB, CW, RTTY, data, 100 W PEP ERP
5403.5 kHz	United States	USB, CW, RTTY, data, 100 W PEP ERP
