= Kheseen Formation =

Geologic formation in Mongolia

- Stratigraphic range: late Ediacaran - early Cambrian; ~550–526 Ma
- Type: Formation
- Unit of: Khuvsgul Group
- Underlies: (Unconformably) Erkhelnuur Formation
- Overlies: (Unconformably) Khirvesteg Formation
- Thickness: ~150–500 m (490–1,640 ft)

Lithology
- Primary: Limestone
- Other: Dolomite, Mudstone, Marl, Shale, Hardground

Location
- Coordinates: 50.875516°N 100.179957°E
- Region: Khövsgöl Province
- Country: Mongolia

Type section
- Named for: Kheseen Gorge
- Named by: Anttila et al.
- Location: Western most rim of Bakh Gorge
- Year defined: 2021
- Kheseen Formation (Mongolia)

The Kheseen Formation, commonly misspelled "Khesen", is a late Ediacaran to early Cambrian aged geologic formation in Mongolia. Dated to roughly ~550 – 526 Ma based on correlations to other formations and carbon isotopes, the formation is composed predominately of carbonate rocks, and contains a microfossil assemblage, referred to as the "Kheseen biota".

The Kheseen biota has been used to calibrate the evolution and origins of metazoans, or animals, to the Tonian to middle Cryogenian, between ∼800 – 700 Ma, based on the potential unsuitably of the Weng'an biota from the Doushantuo Formation and the lack of animal fossils in the formation.

== Discovery and naming ==
The rocks of the Kheseen Formation, as well as others in the wider area, where first studed during the mid-1960s after the discovery of ore-grade phosphorites in the area in 1967 by Donov et al. The Khuvsgul Group would be formally named in 1973 by Ilyin, though misspelled as "Khubsugul Group". Further studies in 1998 by Osokin & Tyzhinov would see the Khesen Formation named, based on layers diamictite found at its base. Later, two informal members would be named based on an unconformity found in the middle of the Khesen Formation, being referred to as the "Lower member" and "Upper member". A study in 2021 would formally split the Khesen Formation into two based on this unconformity, turning the "Lower member" into the Khirvesteg Formation, whilst the "Upper member" would become the Kheseen Formation.

== Geology ==
A stratigraphic column of formations in Khövsgöl Province, Mongolia, including the Kheseen Formation

The Kheseen Formation can be found outcropping along the western most rim of the Bakh Gorge of the larger Kheseen Gorge, in Khövsgöl Province of Mongolia, where is it unconformably overlain by the mudstone and grainstone rocks of the Erkhelnuur Formation, whilst is it unconformably underlain by the diamictite rocks of the Khirvesteg Formation, and forms the middle of the wider Khuvsgul Group.

The formation itself is predominately composed of thin, inter-bedded black micritic limestone and dolomitic mudstones, with layers of fetid marls and shales, phosphatic and silicified hardground found throughout. These layers are mostly discontinuous, which are commonly truncated by cm-scale channelization and autoclastic debris flow. The lower layers of the formation are also known to contain thick carbonate beds of stromatolitic, thrombolitic, and matground textures, as well as the microfossils of the Kheseen biota. Overall, the Kheseen Formation ranges between ~150–500 m (490–1,640 ft) in thickness.

== Dating ==
Chemostratigraphic chart of the Kheseen Formation, including overlying and underlying formations

The precise age of the Kheseen Formation has been difficult for researchers to pin down, with studies correlating it to other formations. One study in 2011 by Macdonald et Jones would see the upper layers of the then Khesen Formation correlated to the late Ediacaran aged Zabit Formation in Siberia, based on the presence of Archaeocyathid-bearing rocks in the overlying Cambrian aged Erkhelnuur Formation. Meanwhile, the fossil bearing layers of the Khesen Formation would correlated to the Zuun-Arts Formation in Mongolia. Later studies done in 2017 and 2019 by Anderson et al. would support this, seeing the top of the Khesen Foramtion placed just below the Proterozoic-Phanerozoic boundary. A study done by Anttila et al. in 2021, which saw the splitting of the Khesen Formation as previously mentioned, would place the newly created Kheseen Formation around the latest Ediacaran into the early Cambrian, based on the Zuun-Arts Formation correlation done by Macdonald et Jones in 2011.

A later study done by Lole Durbin et al in 2026 would recover zircon samples from the top of the formation, with U-Pb dating being performed on them. The samples would yield a date of 525.19±1.3 Ma, seeing the top of the formation dated to the early Cambrian period. Alongside this, they would also aim to confirm the age of the Kheseen biota at the base of the formation through carbonate δ13C and 87Sr/86Sr isotopes found within the formation, which show peaks that can be correlated to other localities. They would note that a decrease of δ13C from roughly ∼+4 to −5‰ has been inferred to either be the late Ediacaran Shuram excursion, or the Basal Cambrian δ13C excursion (BACE) in previous studies, with both of these being equivocal. The 87Sr/86Sr isotopes, with values of 0.7083 to 0.7084, support an early Cambrian age for the Khesen Formation, due to 87Sr/86Sr data from the Ediacaran being above 0.7084, although it is noted that a correlation to the Khatyspyt Formation can also be made, as that has similar values. The Khatyspyt Formation itself has been constrained to ∼550 – 543.9±0.24 Ma, and if the Kheseen Formation was correlated to this formation, this would see the negative δ13C values instead correlate to the Basal Nama δ13C excursion (BANE). This interpretation would be chosen, thus seeing the base of the Kheseen Formation proposed to roughly be correlated to ~550 Ma. This would be further supported through similarities to the Zuun-Arts and Bayangol Formations which also yield similar 87Sr/86Sr values, which would further give evidence to the negative δ13C values in the formation being correlated to the BACE, thus seeing the strata the Kheseen biota is found in likely being deposited between 534 and 526 Ma.

== Paleobiota ==
The Kheseen Formation contains a range of Doushantuo-Pertatanka-Type microfossils in its lower layers. These microfossils include acritarchs, protists, and algae fossils, such as Cavaspina, Megasphaera, and Archaeophycus.

The study undertaken by Lole Durbin et al in 2026 would regard the Weng'an Biota of the lower Doushantuo Formation as unsuitable for use as a maximum calibration on crown Metazoa based on comparisons made between the Weng'an and Kheseen biotas. Whilst the Kheseen is considerably less diverse than the Weng'an, the latter of which has yielded over 50 species, the two share taxa, such as Appendisphaera and Asterocapsoides, with Megasphaera puncticulosa only previously being known from Weng'an. Alongside this, the preservation of the Kheseen microfossils is noted to rival what is seen in the Weng'an microfossils, as well as later phosphatized Cambrian microfossils. The Weng'an mircofossils are also considerably older, with the Kheseen microfossils and formations spanning the Ediacaran-Cambrian boundary, where animal fossils were already present in other localities, with the oldest Kheseen microfossils being contemporary to the biomineralised skeleton, sponge and body fossils in the Nama Group. This thus means that at the time of the Kheseen Formations deposition, animals had evolved, and their notable absence from the formation itself saw the researchers question the use of the Weng'an biota as a maximum calibration for crown group Metazoa. The utilization of the Kheseen biota sees the origin of Metazoa happening somewhere during the Tonian or early Cryogenian (∼800 – 700 Ma, which is older compared to the use of the Weng'an, which sees an origin sometime during the Ediacaran.

Color key: Taxon / Reclassified taxon / Taxon falsely reported as present / Dubious taxon or junior synonym / Ichnotaxon / Ootaxon / Morphotaxon

Notes
Uncertain or tentative taxa are in small text
~~crossed out~~ taxa are discredited.

=== Micro-algae ===
Micro-algae
Genus	Species	Notes	Images
Archaeophycus	A. yunnanensis	Probable algae microfossil.	(J)
Obruchevella	O. magna; O. delicata; O. parvissima; O. valdaica	Filamentous cyanobacteria.	
Siphonophycus	Siphonophycus sp.	Filamentous cyanobacteria.	

=== Protists ===
Protists
Genus	Species	Notes	Images
Megasphaera	M. minuscula; M. inornata; M. ornata; M. puncticulosa (?)	Protist. M. minuscula named from this formation.	

=== Acritarchs ===
Acritarchs
Genus	Species	Notes	Images
Appendisphaera	Appendisphaera sp.; A. grandis; A. fragilis; A. tenuis	Acritarchs	
Asterocapsoides	A. wenganensis	Acritarch	
Cavaspina (?)	C. (?) basiconica	Acritarch	
Knollisphaeridium	K. maximum	Acritarch	
Leiosphaeridia	L. crassa; L. jacutica; L. tenuissima	Acritarchs.	
Mengeosphaera	M. reticulata	Acritarch	
Sinosphaera	Sinosphaera sp.	Acritarch	
Variomargosphaeridium	Variomargosphaeridium sp.; V. aculeiparvum; V. gracile	Acritarchs. V. aculeiparvum named from this formation.	
