= Channelization =

Channelization may refer to:

- Channelization (roads), the separation of divergent traffic flows within a roadway
- Channelization (rivers), the alteration of a waterway to improve its characteristics for shipping
- Channelization (telecommunications), the simultaneous transmission of multiple signals on the same line

== See also ==
- Canalization (disambiguation)
