= Canalization (disambiguation) =

Canalization or canalisation is work to improve the flow of a river.

Canalization or canalisation may also refer to:

- Canalisation (genetics), a measure of the ability of a population to produce the same phenotype regardless of variability of its environment or genotype
- Canalization, a term in psychology established by Gardner Murphy

== See also ==
- Channelization (disambiguation)
- Canalizations of Zenobia
