= VKS737 =

Australian radio network

The VKS-737 Radio Network is a division of the Australian National 4WD Radio Network, a national Public Benevolent Institution, established for Outback travellers who are in distress by providing them with emergency assistance and support in cooperation with other organisations.

The VKS-737 Network provides services in conjunction with the Royal Flying Doctor Service, Police and State Emergency Service organisations 24 hours a day, 7 days a week, via 14 base stations located around Australia.

Founded in 1992, the network's stated goal is to provide reliable radio communication for travellers in remote and Outback areas of Australia. All Network activity involving both bases and subscribers is subject to formal licensing by the Australian Communications and Media Authority (ACMA).

== History ==
The use of HF between Outback travellers goes back many years, based on Royal Flying Doctor Service (RFDS) frequencies such as 5300, 5360 and 5410 kHz.

“Mobile Outpost” licenses allow the use of RFDS frequencies outside of base hours; increasing numbers of users concerned the RFDS, which, in 1992, requested the Department of Transport and Communications to limit the general use of their frequencies.

Mid-1992: Department of Transport and Communications contacted the SA Toyota Landcruiser Club (TLCC) regarding creating a network to allow members to communicate with each other and bases.

Submissions were lodged by Colin Brown and Jeff Francis from TLCC and a submission and license application were lodged by Steve Johnston on behalf of the SA Association of Four-Wheel Drive Clubs (SAAFWDC).

Colin Brown is still actively involved as a show volunteer.

November 1993: The first VKS-737 Radio Network license was issued, and a base station was established at the Hilton in South Australia.

The Network, managed by Steve Johnston the Radio Officer of the SAAFWDC, was only available for use by members of South Australian 4WD Clubs.

March 1994: The network was placed under the control of Steve Johnston, the Radio Officer of the Australian National Four Wheel Drive Council (ANFWDC), for use by members of 4WD Clubs Australia-wide affiliated with ANFWDC via the state 4WD associations.

July 1994: Woomera Base opened.

August 1995: Gosford Base opened.

October 1996: The Australian National 4WD Radio Network was incorporated and the VKS-737 licenses were transferred to the new organisation.

December 1996: The Australian Taxation Office issued approval for the network to become a Public Benevolent Institution.

February 1997: The network became a partner in Tread Lightly! Australia. Steve Johnston was appointed to the Board of Directors of Tread Lightly! Australia.

February 1997: Perth base opened.

April 1997: Alice Springs Base opened.

July 1997: Agreement signed with South Australia Police to provide a joint safety network for subscribers, SA Police patrol cars, and police stations fitted with VKS-737 frequencies. Similar arrangements are now in place with emergency services in several other states. All bases are linked to emergency services giving subscribers direct selcall access.

Agreement signed with the Australian Customs Service for subscribers to be involved with the Customs Hotline (now Australian Border Watch Hotline).

December 1997: Woomera Base closed, St Marys Base opened.

June 1998: Sandstone Base opened.

January 1999:Darwin Base opened.

May 1999: Adelaide Base was relocated to the Head Office at Elizabeth, Cairns Base opened.

August 1999: Derby Base opened.

November 1999: Gosford Base closed, Newcastle Base opened.

September 2001: Charters Towers Base opened.

April 2004: Sandstone Base closed, Swan Hill Base opened.

2008: All bases upgraded with the latest generation Barrett 2060 radio-telephone interconnects.

August 2008: HF-Tel (a division of the Australian National 4WD Radio Network) was formed to provide direct-dial radio-telephone facilities for subscribers via the new Barrett 2060 radio-telephone interconnects.

November 2008: Two additional frequencies approved by ACMA for use by VKS-737 subscribers.

November 2009: Duplicated Base Stations installed at Alice Springs and Charters Towers.

January 2010: New digital PABX installed to allow improved communications between the network and other Emergency Service Organisations.

May 2010: Duplicated Base Station installed at Adelaide

October 2010: The VKS-737 Radio Network formed a partnership with the Royal Flying Doctor Service (Queensland Section and Western Operations) to provide Emergency HF radio communications services for the RFDS. As part of the agreement the VKS-737 Radio Network installed new base stations at the RFDS bases in Queensland and Western Australia, these bases operate on all VKS-737 frequencies as well as the existing frequencies licensed to the RFDS at the relevant base.

October 2010: VKS-737 Derby base relocated to the RFDS Base.

October 2010: New VKS-737 Port Hedland base commissioned at RFDS base.

November 2010: New VKS-737 Carnarvon base commissioned at Carnarvon RFDS base.

November 2010: New VKS-737 Meekatharra base commissioned at Meekatharra RFDS base.

December 2010: New VKS-737 Cairns-1 base commissioned at Cairns RFDS base. The existing Cairns base was renamed Cairns-2 base.

January 2011: New VKS-737 Mount Isa Base commissioned at Mount Isa RFDS Base.

March 2011: New VKS-737 Charleville Base commissioned at Charleville RFDS Base.

June 2012: VKS-737 Cairns - 2 Base relocated from Innisfail to Malanda in the Atherton Tablelands.

August 2012: Head Office PABX extended with 100 dedicated VoIP lines enabling emergency services direct in-dialing to VKS-737 operators.

January 2013: VKS-737 services expanded to provide Emergency Service access to satellite telephone users who do not have HF radio facilities.

February 2013: Head Office PABX extended with a further 100 dedicated VoIP (total 200) lines to further enhance services in cases of emergency.

2017: All bases upgraded with the latest generation Codan 3033 / Envoy radio-telephone interconnects.

March 2019: Port Hedland Base closed due to the termination of the RFDS TX site lease at Port Hedland International Airport.

August 2019: Derby Base closed due to the relocation of RFDS from Derby to Broome.

January 2020: Swan Hill Base closed and was relocated to Stawell.

January 2020: Stawell Base commissioned.

April 2023: Darwin Base closed.

September 2023: Cairns 2 Base closed.

December 2023: HF-Tel Service closed.

August 2025: Newcastle Base closed.

== Administration ==
The Australian National 4WD Radio Network is managed by a committee of seven people who are elected for two-year terms by Network subscribers.
