= Channelization (telecommunications) =

Channelized in a telecommunications environment means that the line that communications have been transmitted over contains more than one message thread, separated in some fashion.

Typical channelization methods include packetizing, frequency-division multiplexing, and time-division multiplexing.

== See also ==
- Channel (communications)
