= Channel 16 VHF =

Radio frequency on the marine VHF radio band

Channel 16 VHF (156.800 MHz) is a marine VHF radio frequency designated as an international distress frequency. Primarily intended for distress, urgency and safety priority calls, the frequency may also carry routine calls used to establish communication before switching to another working channel.

== Authorized usage ==
The International Telecommunication Union (ITU) has established VHF channel 16 (156.8 MHz) as a distress, safety and calling channel, and it is monitored 24 hours a day by many coast guards around the world.

Radio watchkeeping regulations advise all sea bound vessels to monitor channel 16 VHF when sailing, except when communicating on other marine channels for legitimate business or operational reasons. Coast guards and others are permitted to broadcast short informative safety messages on channel 16; however, it is an offence in most countries to make false "mayday" calls. When using the channel to call up ships or shore stations, the call has to be switched to a working channel after the initial response in order to keep channel 16 available to others.

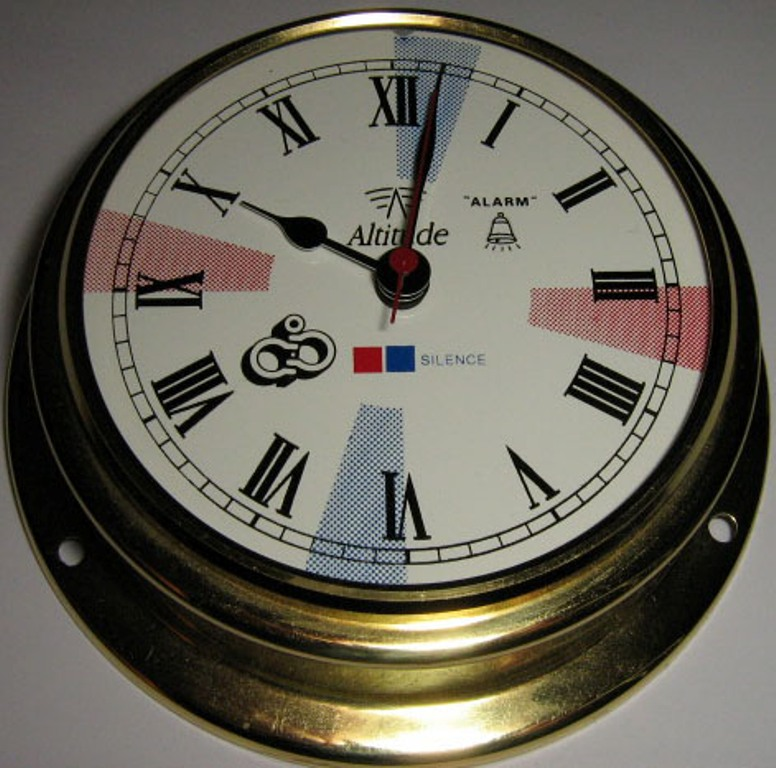
Radio silence clock

== See also ==
- 2,182 kHz
- Filipino Monkey
