= 2182 kHz =

Radio distress frequency

2182 kHz is a radio frequency designated exclusively for distress calls and related calling operations in the maritime service. It is equivalent to a wavelength of 137.4 metres.

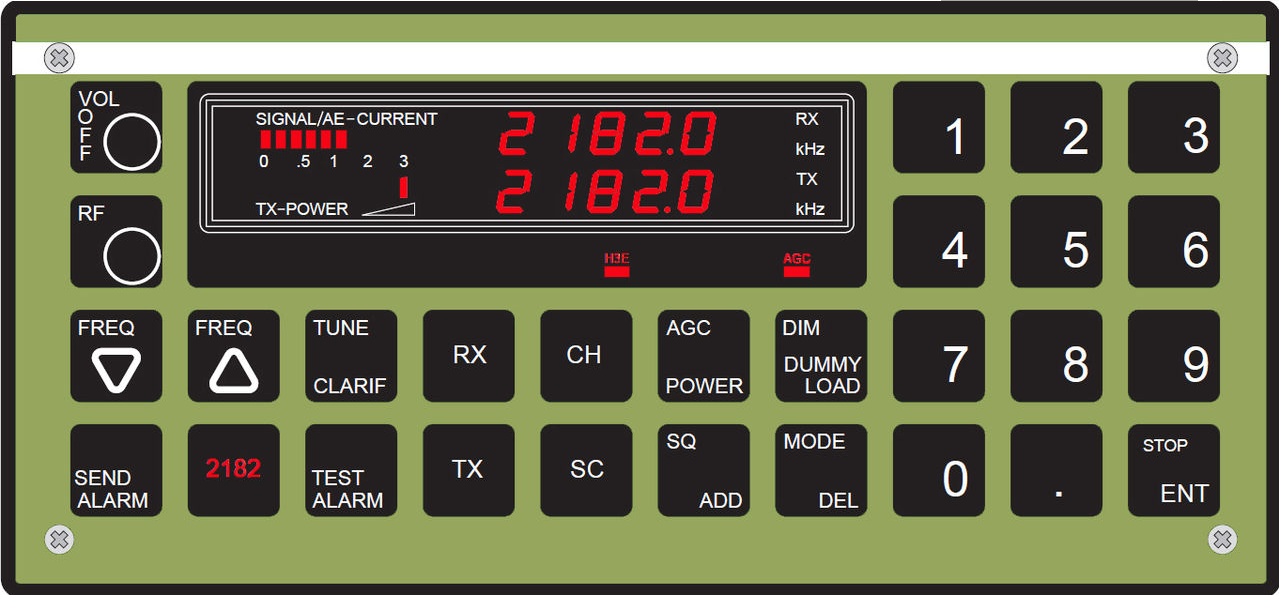
Marine radio transceiver (1.6–26 MHz)

== Transmission modes ==
Transmissions on 2182 kHz commonly use single-sideband modulation (SSB) (upper sideband only). However, amplitude modulation (AM) and some variants such as vestigial sideband are still in use, mainly by vessels with older equipment and by some coastal stations in an attempt to ensure compatibility with older and less sophisticated receivers.

Frequency allocation 2173.5–2190.5 kHz
Allocation to services
ITU Region 1	ITU Region 2	ITU Region 3
2173.5–2190.5 kHz Mobile service (distress and calling)

== Range ==
2182 kHz is analogous to channel 16 on the marine VHF band, but unlike VHF which is limited to ranges of about 20 to 50 nautical miles (40 to 90 km) depending on antenna height, communications on 2182 kHz and nearby frequencies have a reliable range of around 50 to 100 nautical miles (90 to 190 km) during the day and 150 to 300 nautical miles (280 to 560 km) or sometimes more at night.

The reception range of even a well-equipped station can be severely limited in summer because of static caused by lightning.

== Silence period ==
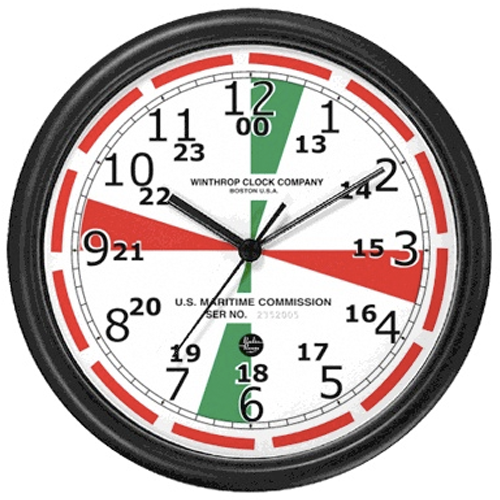
Ship's radio room clock

Historically, all stations using 2182 kHz were required to maintain a strictly enforced three-minute silence and listening period twice each hour, starting at h+00ᵐ, h+30ᵐ. This allowed any station with distress, urgent or safety traffic the best chance of being heard at that time, even if they were at some distance from other stations, operating on reduced battery power or perhaps reduced antenna efficiency, as for example from a demasted vessel.

As a visual aide-memoire, a typical clock in a ship's radio room would have these silence periods marked by shading the sectors from h+00ᵐ to h+03ᵐ, and from h+30ᵐ to h+33ᵐ in green. Similar sectors were marked in red for what used to be the corresponding silence and listening period on 500 kHz from h+15ᵐ to h+18ᵐ, and from h+45ᵐ to h+48ᵐ. Since the introduction of GMDSS, these silence periods are no longer required.

== Licensing ==
In order to operate a marine radio transmitter on 2182 kHz, the operator must hold a GMDSS General Operating Certificate for mandatory installations, a Long Range Certificate for voluntary ones, or other equivalent and recognised radio operator's qualifications. Both these certificates have a wider syllabus than those of the GMDSS Restricted Operators Course or the RYA Short Range Certificate that is necessary for marine VHF use. In practice, an unqualified operator would not be prosecuted for the use of either type of transmitter in a situation that turned out to be a genuine emergency.

== Related distress frequencies ==
2182 kHz forms an essential part of the Global Maritime Distress Safety System (GMDSS). It has an associated DSC frequency at 2187.5 kHz. Other international distress frequencies, in use as of 2008, include:

- 121.5 MHz and 243.0 MHz – civil aircraft emergency frequency
- 243 MHz – military aircraft emergency frequency
- 156.8 MHz – Marine VHF radio channel 16, short range maritime use
- 406 MHz / 406.1 MHz – Cospas-Sarsat international satellite-based search and rescue (SAR) distress alert detection and information distribution system

== Discontinued frequencies ==
- 500 kHz, now obsolete Morse code maritime distress frequency.
- 121.5 MHz and 243 MHz, for which locator beacons are no longer automatically monitored by satellite, though the frequencies are still used for aircraft communication and short-range direction finding signals.
- Effective 1 August 2013, the U.S. Coast Guard terminated its radio watch on the international voice distress, safety, and calling frequency 2182 kHz and the international digital selective calling (DSC) distress and safety frequency 2187.5 kHz. Marine information and weather broadcasts that had been transmitted on 2670 kHz ended at the same time. The U.S. Coast Guard does still monitor HF (4–22 MHz) marine distress / safety / calling voice and DSC frequencies.

== See also ==
- Distress signal
- Marine VHF radio
- Mayday (distress signal)
- Pan-pan
- Sécurité
- Global Maritime Distress Safety System
- 500 kHz
