= Marine VHF radio =

Radios operating in the very high frequency maritime mobile band

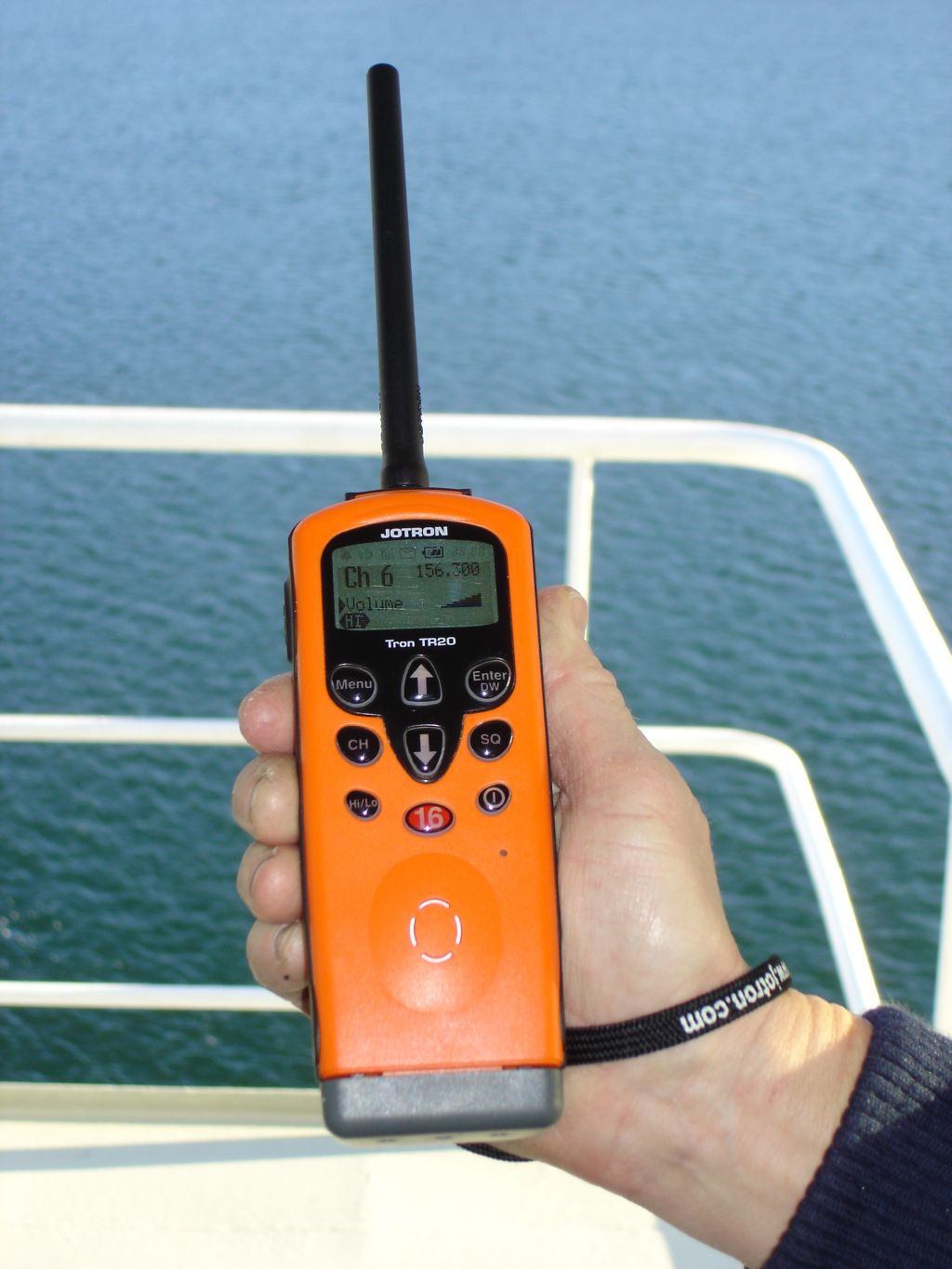
A standard handheld marine VHF, mandatory on larger seagoing vessels under the GMDSS rules

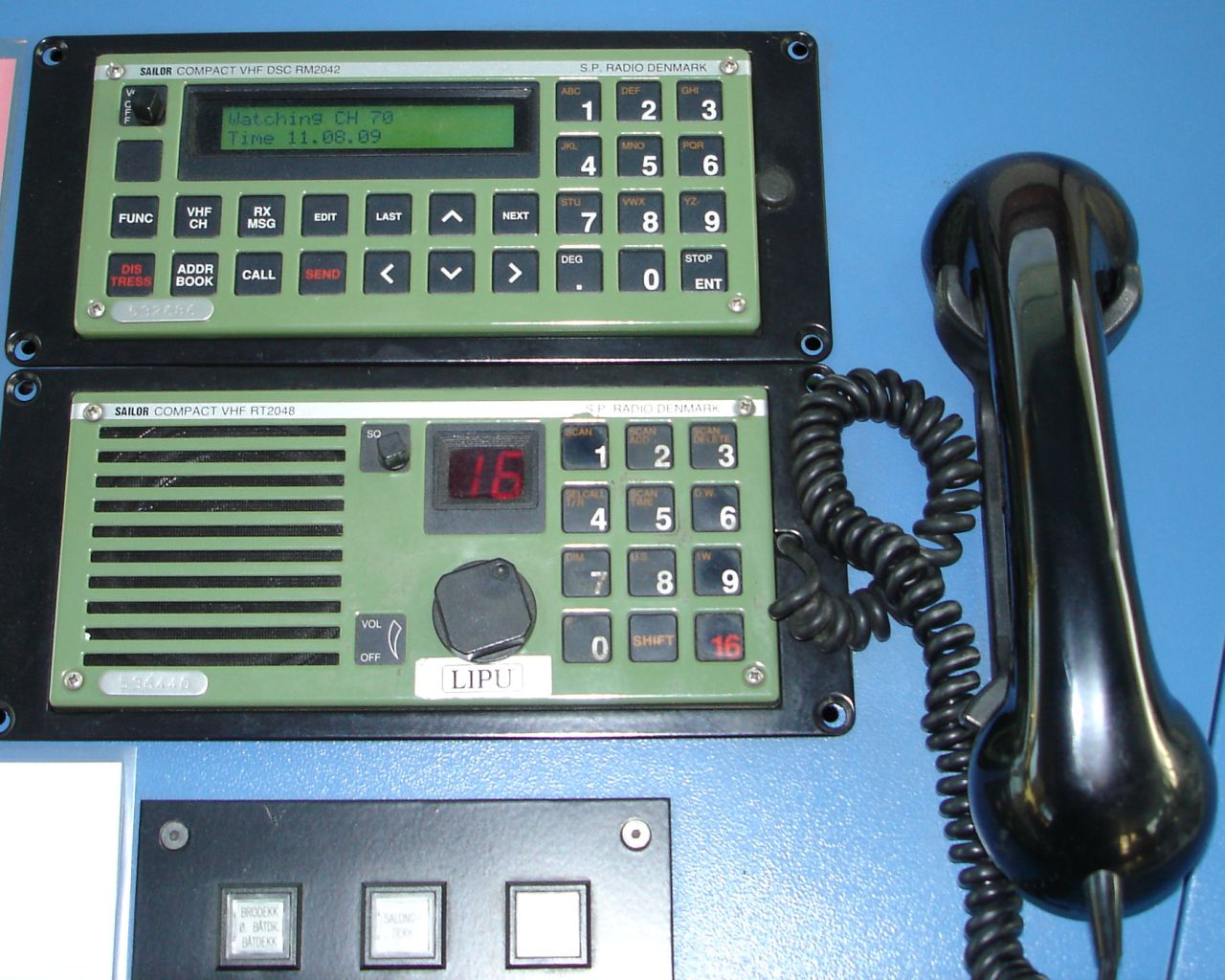
A VHF set and a VHF channel 70 DSC set, the DSC on top

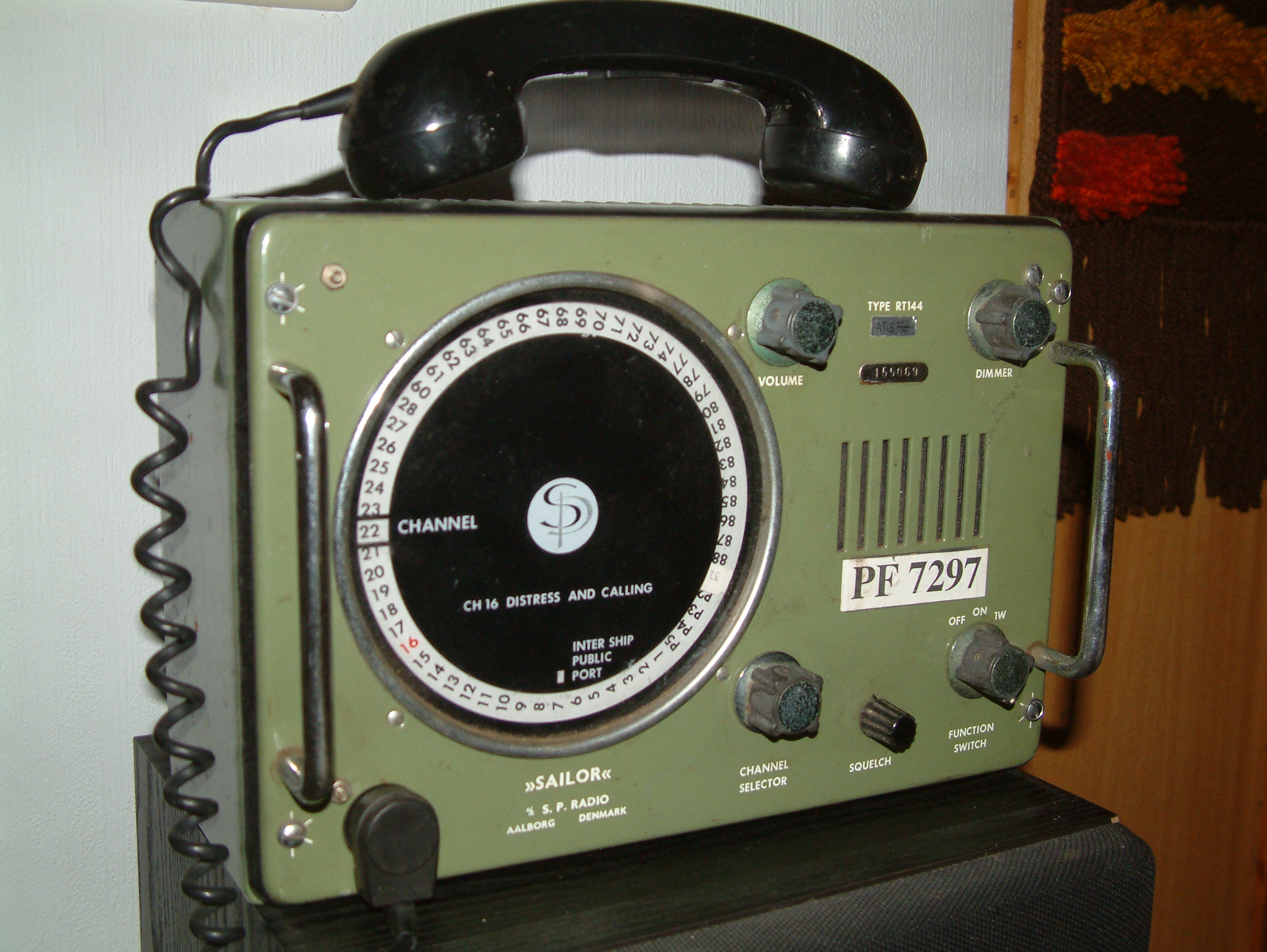
A vintage (76–89) marine VHF radiotelephone

Marine VHF radio is a worldwide system of two-way radio transceivers on ships and watercraft used for bidirectional voice communication from ship-to-ship, ship-to-shore (for example with harbormasters), and in certain circumstances ship-to-aircraft. It uses FM channels in the very high frequency (VHF) radio band in the frequency range between 156 and 174 MHz, designated by the International Telecommunication Union as the VHF maritime mobile band. In some countries additional channels are used, such as the L and F channels for leisure and fishing vessels in the Nordic countries (at 155.5–155.825 MHz). Transmitter power is limited to 25 watts, giving them a range of about 100 kilometres (62 mi; 54 nmi).

Marine VHF radio equipment is installed on all large ships and most seagoing small craft. It is also used, with slightly different regulation, on rivers and lakes. It is used for a wide variety of purposes, including marine navigation and traffic control, summoning rescue services and communicating with harbours, locks, bridges and marinas.

== Background ==
Marine radio was the first commercial application of radio technology, allowing ships to keep in touch with shore and other ships, and send out a distress call for rescue in case of emergency. Guglielmo Marconi invented radio communication in the 1890s, and the Marconi Company installed wireless telegraphy stations on ships beginning around 1900. Marconi built a string of shore stations and in 1904 established the first Morse code distress call, the letters CQD, used until 1906 when SOS was agreed on. The first significant marine rescue due to radio was the 1909 sinking of the luxury liner RMS Republic, in which 1,500 lives were saved. This and the 1912 RMS Titanic rescue brought the field of marine radio to public consciousness, and marine radio operators were regarded as heroes. By 1920, the US had a string of 12 coastal stations stretched along the Atlantic seaboard from Bar Harbor, Maine to Cape May, New Jersey.

The first marine radio transmitters used the longwave bands. During World War I amplitude modulation was developed, and in the 1920s spark radiotelegraphy equipment was replaced by vacuum tube radiotelephony allowing voice communication. Also in the 1920s, the ionospheric skip or skywave phenomenon was discovered, which allowed lower power vacuum tube transmitters operating in the shortwave bands to communicate at long distances.

Hoping to foil German detection during the World War II Battle of the Atlantic, American and British convoy escorts used Talk-Between-Ships (TBS) radios operating on VHF.

== Types of equipment ==
Sets can be fixed or portable. A fixed set generally has the advantages of a more reliable power source, higher transmit power, a larger and more effective antenna and a bigger display and buttons. A portable set (often essentially a waterproof, VHF walkie-talkie in design) can be carried on a kayak, or to a lifeboat in an emergency, has its own power source and is waterproof if GMDSS-approved. A few portable VHFs are even approved to be used as emergency radios in environments requiring intrinsically safe equipment (e.g. gas tankers, oil rigs, etc.).

=== Voice-only ===
Voice only equipment is the traditional type, which relies totally on the human voice for calling and communicating. Many lower priced handheld units are voice only as well as older fixed units.

=== Digital selective calling ===
DSC equipment, a part of the Global Maritime Distress and Safety System (GMDSS), provides all the functionality of voice-only equipment and, additionally, allows several other features:

- The ability to call another vessel using a unique identifier known as a Maritime Mobile Service Identity (MMSI). This information is carried digitally and the receiving set will alert the operator of an incoming call once its own MMSI is detected. Calls are set up on the dedicated VHF channel 70 which DSC equipment must listen on continuously. The actual voice communication then takes place on a different channel specified by the caller.
- A distress button, which automatically sends a digital distress signal identifying the calling vessel and the nature of the emergency
- A built in GPS receiver or facility to connect an external GPS receiver so that the user's location may be transmitted automatically along with a distress call.

When a DSC radio is bought new the user will get the opportunity to program it with the MMSI number of the ship it is intended to be used on. However to change the MMSI after the initial programming can be problematic and require special proprietary tools. This is allegedly done to prevent theft.

=== Automatic identification system ===
More advanced transceiver units support AIS. This relies on a GPS receiver built into the VHF equipment or an externally connected one by which the transceiver obtains its position and transmits this information along with some other details about the ship (MMSI, cargo, draught, destination and some others) to nearby ships. AIS operates as a mesh network and full featured units relay AIS messages from other ships, greatly extending the range of this system; however some low-end units are receive only or do not support the relaying functionality.

AIS data is carried on dedicated VHF channels 87B and 88B at a baud rate of 9,600bit/s using GMSK modulation and uses a form of time-division multiplexing.

=== Text messaging ===
Using the RTCM 12301.1 standard it is possible to send and receive text messages in a similar fashion to SMS between marine VHF transceivers which comply with this standard. However, as of 2019 very few transceivers support this feature. The recipient of the message needs to be tuned to the same channel as the transmitting station in order to receive it.

== Regulation ==
In the United States, any person can legally purchase a Marine VHF radio and use it to communicate without requiring any special license as long as they abide by certain rules, but in a great many other countries a license is required to transmit on Marine VHF frequencies.

In the United Kingdom and Ireland and some other European countries both the operator and the equipment must be separately licensed. A Short Range Certificate is the minimum requirement to use an installed marine VHF radio. This is usually obtained after completing a course of around two days and passing an exam. This is intended for those operating on lakes and in coastal areas whereas a Long Range Certificate is usually recommended for those operating further out as it also covers HF and MF radios as well as INMARSAT systems. Installations fixed on a particular vessel require a Ship Radio License. Portable equipment that could be used in multiple craft, dinghys etc. required a Ship Portable Radio Licence.

=== Automatic Transmitter Identification System (marine) ===
For use on the inland waterways within continental Europe, a compulsory Automatic Transmitter Identification System (ATIS) transmission conveys the vessel's identity after each voice transmission. This is a ten-digit code that is either an encoded version of the ship's alphanumeric call sign, or for vessels from outside the region, the ship MMSI prefixed with "9". The requirement to use ATIS in Europe, and which VHF channels may be used, are strongly regulated, most recently by the Basel agreements.

== Channels and frequencies ==
A marine VHF set is a combined transmitter and receiver and only operates on standard, international frequencies known as channels. Channel 16 (156.8 MHz) is the international calling and distress channel. Transmission power ranges between 1 and 25 watts, giving a maximum range of up to about 60 nautical miles (111 km) between aerials mounted on tall ships and hills, and 5 nautical miles (9 km; 6 mi) between aerials mounted on small boats at sea level. Frequency modulation (FM) is used, with vertical polarization, meaning that antennas have to be vertical in order to have good reception. For longer range communication at sea, marine MF and marine HF bands and satellite phones can be used.

Half-duplex channels here are listed with the A and B frequencies the same. The frequencies, channels, and some of their purposes are governed by the ITU. For an authoritative list see. The original allocation of channels consisted of only channels 1 to 28 with 50 kHz spacing between channels, and the second frequency for full-duplex operation 4.6 MHz higher.

Improvements in radio technology later meant that the channel spacing could be reduced to 25 kHz with channels 60 to 88 interspersed between the original channels.

Channels 75 and 76 are omitted as they are either side of the calling and distress channel 16, acting as guard channels. The frequencies which would have been the second frequencies on half-duplex channels are not used for marine purposes and can be used for other purposes that vary by country. For example, 161.000 to 161.450 MHz are part of the allocation to the Association of American Railroads channels used by railways in the US and Canada.

Channel number	Frequencies (MHz)		United Kingdom	United States	Canada	Australia	New Zealand	Finland	Europe CEPT Mediterranean countries (sea, ocean)	Belgium France Germany Netherlands Rhine: main stem, river, canal, lake, pond, estuary
Channel number	A Ship tx, usually	B Shore tx, usually	United Kingdom	United States	Canada	Australia	New Zealand	Finland	Europe CEPT Mediterranean countries (sea, ocean)	Belgium France Germany Netherlands Rhine: main stem, river, canal, lake, pond, estuary
0	156.000	160.600	Private, coast guard A							
1	156.050	160.650		Ship-to-ship/shore, commercial and safety West Coast A				Public correspondence (ship-to-shore full-duplex) port operations	Public correspondence (ship-to-shore full-duplex), Independent radio networks	Radiotelephone links between ship stations and land stations of the authorities responsible for the operation of inland waterways.. (ship-to-shore full-duplex)
2	156.100	160.700			Public; BC Coast			Public correspondence (ship-to-shore full-duplex) port operations	Public correspondence (ship-to-shore full-duplex), Independent radio networks	Radiotelephone links between ship stations and land stations of the authorities responsible for the operation of inland waterways.. (ship-to-shore full-duplex)
3	156.150	160.750		A Illegal for public use (Note: Some radios enable channels 3A, 61A, and 64A when configured for "USA mode" even though those channels are allocated exclusively for Public Safety use by the FCC. The frequencies 156.075, 156.150, and 156.225 MHz are used for interoperability communication by police and fire departments in many areas.)	Public; BC Coast/Inland		Boat to Boat – Kawau	Public correspondence (ship-to-shore full-duplex) port operations	Public correspondence (ship-to-shore full-duplex), Independent radio networks, Customs Coast Guard, search and rescue	Radiotelephone links between ship stations and land stations of the authorities responsible for the operation of inland waterways. (ship-to-shore full-duplex)
4	156.200	160.800			Ship-to-ship/shore, commercial and safety East Coast and Inland A Canadian Coast Guard – Search & Rescue; BC Coast (Note: CCG public operations moved from 22A to 04A to avoid interference from USCG stations in northern Washington state.) A		Boat to boat Tutukaka/Raglan	Public correspondence (ship-to-shore full-duplex) port operations	Public correspondence (ship-to-shore full-duplex), independent radio networks, customs, coast guard, search and rescue	Public correspondence (ship-to-shore full-duplex), independent radio networks
5	156.250	160.850		Commercial Vessels for Check In to VTS A				Public correspondence (ship-to-shore full-duplex) port operations	Public correspondence (ship-to-shore full-duplex), independent radio networks, authorities responsible	Radiotelephone links between ship stations and land stations of the authorities responsible for the operation of inland waterways (ship-to-shore full-duplex)
6	156.300	156.300	Ship-to-ship and ship-to-air A		Ship-to-ship and ship-to-air A	Distress ship-to-air	Inter-ship working	A Ship-to-ship (commercial) also SAR: Ship-to-ship and ship-to-air	A Ship-to-ship and ship-to-air	Ship-to-ship (limited to 1 watt) and ship-to-air
7	156.350	160.950			General working channel			Public correspondence (ship-to-shore full-duplex) port operations	Navy	Radiotelephone links between ship stations and land stations of the authorities responsible for the operation of inland waterways (ship-to-shore full-duplex)
8	156.400	156.400	Ship-to-ship A		Ship-to-ship; East and west coasts, Lake Winnipeg A	Inter-ship working	Inter-ship working	A Ship-to-ship (commercial)	A Ship-to-ship	A Ship-to-ship (limited to 1 watt)
9	156.450	156.450	Frequently used by pilots A	Calling A , commercial and non-commercial.	Ship-to-air for maritime support Atlantic and BC coasts A	Pilots, port operations	Port operations	A VTS; Ship-to-ship + port operations	Marina pilots, marina operations, ship in a marina	Marina pilots, marina operations, ship in a marina, limited to 1 watt
10	156.500	156.500	Frequently used by HM Coastguard A		Ship-to-air – SAR and antipollution A General working – Atlantic and BC coasts, Great Lakes		Port operations	A Ship-to-ship port operations also SAR and oil cleanup only VTS on Gulf of Finland	International waters ship-to-ship; customs, coast guard, navy	Calling; ship-to-ship; customs, on-board working, limited to 1 watt; distress, safety, and calling
11	156.550	156.550	Port operations		Vessel Traffic Services – BC coast		Port operations	A port operations, also the Saimaa Canal locks	Navy	Port operations
12	156.600	156.600	Port operations	VTS – San Francisco offshore Pilotage A	Vessel Traffic Services – BC coast	Port operations, VTS	Port operations	A port operations	Commercial port operations, fishing port operations, pilots, ship in a fishing port, ship in a commercial port	
13	156.650	156.650	Bridge-to-bridge working A	Bridge-to-bridge safety A : Vessels > 20m must maintain watch, Tx limited to 1 watt. Movable bridge / lock operations.	VTS – BC coast Bridge-to-bridge safety A	Port operations, VTS	Intership Nav Safety	A Pilots; Ship-to-ship port operations	Port operations, coast guard	Ship-to-ship (limited to 1 watt)
14	156.700	156.700	Port operations	VTS – San Francisco bay and delta Pilotage A	VTS – BC coast Port and pilot ops A		Port operations	A Working channel for SAR authorities, Turku Radio (port operations)	Port operations, navy	Port operations
15	156.750	156.750	A On-board working, limited to 1 watt					A max. 1 W Intraship; Ship-to-ship port operations	Beach monitoring	Radiocommunications on board a ship or in a group of boats towed or pushed, as well as those concerning the instructions for the maneuver bullish and docking, limited to 1 watt
16	156.800	156.800	International distress, safety and calling A All vessels equipped with VHF must maintain watch.							Estuary (16 + 10). Not used on: main stem, river, canal, lake, pond.
17	156.850	156.850	A On-board working		BC Coast Pilots		Aquatic sports events	A max. 1 W Intraship; Ship-to-ship port operations	Port operations, navy, Maritime Gendarmerie	Radiocommunications on board a ship or in a group of boats towed or pushed, as well as those concerning the instructions for the maneuver bullish and docking. (limited to 1 watt)
18	156.900	161.500						Public correspondence (ship-to-shore full-duplex) port operations	Public correspondence (ship-to-shore full-duplex), Independent radio networks	Radiotelephone links between ship stations and land stations of the authorities responsible for the operation of inland waterways (ship-to-shore full-duplex)
19	156.950	161.550		Landside facilities: harbormaster, marinas.	Canadian Coast Guard working channel			Public correspondence (ship-to-shore full-duplex) port operations	Public correspondence (ship-to-shore full-duplex), port operations	Radiotelephone links between ship stations and land stations of the authorities responsible for the operation of inland waterways (ship-to-shore full-duplex)
20	157.000	161.600				Repeater operations	Continuous weather Maritime Safety Service	Public correspondence (ship-to-shore full-duplex) port operations	Port operations, Public correspondence (ship-to-shore full-duplex)	Radiotelephone links between ship stations and land stations of the authorities responsible for the operation of inland waterways (ship-to-shore full-duplex), (limited to 1 watt Paris Underground canal)
21	157.050	161.650		A U.S. Coast Guard only	Continuous marine broadcasts B (WX 8)		Continuous weather Maritime Safety Service	Public correspondence (ship-to-shore full-duplex) port operations	Port operations	
22	157.100	161.700		A U.S. Coast Guard public working channel (Note: Channel 22A is reserved for communication between the U.S. Coast Guard vessels and private vessels. The Coast Guard does not monitor 22A: Contact must first be established on 16.)	A Canadian Coast Guard working channel		Continuous weather Maritime Safety Service	Public correspondence (ship-to-shore full-duplex) port operations	Port operations, public correspondence (ship-to-shore full-duplex)	Radiotelephone links between ship stations and land stations of the authorities responsible for the operation of inland waterways (ship-to-shore full-duplex)
23	157.150	161.750	HM Coastguard Maritime Safety Information: now on 62, 63, 64.	A U.S. Coast Guard Only			Continuous weather Maritime Safety Service	Public correspondence (ship-to-shore full-duplex) port operations	Port operations, Public correspondence (ship-to-shore full-duplex)	Radiotelephone links between ship stations and land stations of the authorities responsible for the operation of inland waterways (ship-to-shore full-duplex), Independent radio networks
24	157.200	161.800	UKSAR G/A Winching A UKSAR TWC B (Note: UKSAR land-based search and rescue teams have access to the half-duplexed versions of 24, 62, 63, 64, 85 for operational and training needs. These include mountain rescue teams in England, Wales and Scotland.)					Public correspondence (ship-to-shore full-duplex) port operations	Public correspondence (ship-to-shore full-duplex), Independent radio networks	Radiotelephone links between ship stations and land stations of the authorities responsible for the operation of inland waterways (ship-to-shore full-duplex)
25	157.250	161.850					Maritime radio working channel	Public correspondence (ship-to-shore full-duplex) port operations	Public correspondence (ship-to-shore full-duplex), Independent radio networks	Radiotelephone links between ship stations and land stations of the authorities responsible for the operation of inland waterways (ship-to-shore full-duplex)
26	157.300	161.900	HM Coastguard Maritime Safety Information	Public correspondence (marine telephone operator)	Canadian Coast Guard Duplex – Public Correspondence			Public correspondence (ship-to-shore full-duplex) port operations	Public correspondence (ship-to-shore full-duplex), Independent radio networks	Radiotelephone links between ship stations and land stations of the authorities responsible for the operation of inland waterways (ship-to-shore full-duplex)
27	157.350	161.950						Public correspondence (ship-to-shore full-duplex) port operations	Public correspondence (ship-to-shore full-duplex), independent radio networks	Radiotelephone links between ship stations and land stations of the authorities responsible for the operation of inland waterways (ship-to-shore full-duplex)
28	157.400	162.000						Public correspondence (ship-to-shore full-duplex) port operations	Public correspondence (ship-to-shore full-duplex), independent radio networks	Radiotelephone links between ship stations and land stations of the authorities responsible for the operation of inland waterways (ship-to-shore full-duplex)
31	157.550	162.150								(The Netherlands) Marina channel public correspondence (ship-to-shore full-duplex)
M1/37A	157.850	157.850	(As M1) Yacht clubs, race committees and marinas							
60	156.025	160.625						GOFREP on Gulf of Finland public correspondence (ship-to-shore full-duplex) port operations	Public correspondence (ship-to-shore full-duplex), Independent radio networks	Radiotelephone links between ship stations and land stations of the authorities responsible for the operation of inland waterways (ship-to-shore full-duplex)
61	156.075	160.675		A Illegal for public use				GOFREP (Estonia) on Gulf of Finland; Public correspondence (ship-to-shore full-duplex) port operations	Public correspondence (ship-to-shore full-duplex), Independent radio networks	Radiotelephone links between ship stations and land stations of the authorities responsible for the operation of inland waterways (ship-to-shore full-duplex)
62	156.125	160.725	HM Coastguard Maritime Safety Information				Boat to boat – Waiheke/Whangaroa	Public correspondence (ship-to-shore full-duplex) port operations	Public correspondence (ship-to-shore full-duplex), independent radio networks	Radiotelephone links between ship stations and land stations of the authorities responsible for the operation of inland waterways (ship-to-shore full-duplex)
63	156.175	160.775	HM Coastguard Maritime Safety Information (half-duplex)				Boat to boat – Manukau	Public correspondence (ship-to-shore full-duplex) port operations	Coast Guard, port operations	Radiotelephone links between ship stations and land stations of the authorities responsible for the operation of inland waterways (ship-to-shore full-duplex)
64	156.225	160.825	HM Coastguard Maritime Safety Information (half-duplex)	A Illegal for public use				Public correspondence (ship-to-shore full-duplex) port operations	Coast Guard, port operations	Radiotelephone links between ship stations and land stations of the authorities responsible for the operation of inland waterways (ship-to-shore full-duplex)
65	156.275	160.875	National Coastwatch Institution (NCI) and Independent Coastwatch Stations (http://www.seasafetygroup.org) Working Channel for communication with local mariners for radio checks and local sea conditions. Effective 1 March 2021.		Marine assistance working channel		Boat to boat – Coromandel	Public correspondence (ship-to-shore full-duplex) port operations	Coast Guard, port operations	Radiotelephone links between ship stations and land stations of the authorities responsible for the operation of inland waterways (ship-to-shore duplex)
66	156.325	160.925			A BC coast marinas			Public correspondence (ship-to-shore duplex) port operations	Public correspondence (ship-to-shore duplex), Independent radio networks	Radiotelephone links between ship stations and land stations of the authorities responsible for the operation of inland waterways (ship-to-shore duplex)
67	156.375	156.375	UK Small Ship Safety Channel			Working Channel, Marine Weather	Maritime radio working channel	A VTS (Ship-to-ship + port operations)	Coast Guard	Radiotelephone links between ship stations and land stations of the authorities responsible for the operation of inland waterways (ship-to-shore duplex)
68	156.425	156.425		Non-commercial A			Maritime radio working channel	A port operations, border guard authorities, Also some yacht clubs and marinas	Coast Guard	Radiotelephone links between ship stations and land stations of the authorities responsible for the operation of inland waterways (ship-to-shore duplex)
69	156.475	156.475	Port operations	Non-commercial A		Australian Navy	Maritime radio working channel surf lifesaving	A Ship-to-ship port operations	Navy	Radiotelephone links between ship stations and land stations of the authorities responsible for the operation of inland waterways (ship-to-shore duplex)
70	156.525	156.525	Digital Selective Calling A							Not used on: main stem, river, canal, lake, pond.
71	156.575	156.575	Port operations	Non-commercial A	Vessel Traffic Services – BC Coast		Maritime radio working channel	A VTS (ship-to-ship + port operations) port operations	Navy	Port operations
72	156.625	156.625	Ship-to-ship A Frequently used by leisure craft	Non-commercial ship-to-ship A	Ship-to-ship			A Ship-to-ship; Ship-to-air	A Ship-to-ship, communications with a social (ship)	A Ship-to-ship, communications with a social (ship) (limited to 1 watt)
73	156.675	156.675	HM Coastguard Safety Broadcasts Backup Small Ship Safety			Ship-to-ship	Marinas working	A Ship-to-ship Ship-to-air (port operations)	Port operations, Navy	Radiotelephone links between ship stations and land stations of the authorities responsible for the operation of inland waterways (ship-to-shore duplex)
74	156.725	156.725	British Waterways/Canal and River Trust Channel (Canal and River System) port operations		Vessel Traffic Services – BC Coast	Ship-to-ship	Coast/Ship working	A port operations	Port operations, navy, Maritime Gendarmerie	Port operations
75	156.775	156.775	Long Range AIS: Message 27 transmission only A							
76	156.825	156.825	Long Range AIS: Message 27 transmission only A							
77	156.875	156.875	Ship-to-ship A			Ship-to-ship		A Ship-to-ship	A Ship-to-ship, communications with a social (ship)	A Ship-to-ship, communications with a social (ship), limited to 1 watt
78	156.925	161.525		Non-commercial A				Public correspondence (ship-to-shore duplex) port operations	Public correspondence (ship-to-shore duplex), independent radio networks	Radiotelephone links between ship stations and land stations of the authorities responsible for the operation of inland waterways (ship-to-shore duplex)
79	156.975	161.575						Public correspondence (ship-to-shore duplex) port operations	Customs, coast guard, search and rescue, port operations	Radiotelephone links between ship stations and land stations of the authorities responsible for the operation of inland waterways (ship-to-shore duplex)
80	157.025	161.625	UK marina channel			Repeater operations	Coastguard radio working channel	GOFREP on Gulf of Finland public correspondence (ship-to-shore duplex) port operations	Customs, Coast Guard, search and rescue, port operations	Radiotelephone links between ship stations and land stations of the authorities responsible for the operation of inland waterways (ship-to-shore duplex)
81	157.075	161.675		A U.S. Government Use Only		Repeater Operations	Coastguard radio working channel	GOFREP (Estonia) on Gulf of Finland public correspondence (ship-to-shore duplex) port operations	Public correspondence (ship-to-shore duplex), independent radio networks	Radiotelephone links between ship stations and land stations of the authorities responsible for the operation of inland waterways (ship-to-shore duplex)
82	157.125	161.725		A U.S. Government use only	A Canadian Coast Guard working channel		Coastguard radio working channel	Public correspondence (ship-to-shore duplex) port operations	Port operations	Radiotelephone links between ship stations and land stations of the authorities responsible for the operation of inland waterways (ship-to-shore duplex)
83	157.175	161.775		A U.S. Coast Guard use only	A Canadian Coast Guard working channel			Public correspondence (ship-to-shore duplex) port operations	Public correspondence (ship-to-shore duplex) port operations	Radiotelephone links between ship stations and land stations of the authorities responsible for the operation of inland waterways (ship-to-shore duplex)
84	157.225	161.825	HM Coastguard Maritime Safety Information: now on 62, 63, 64.		Canadian Coast Guard Duplex – Public Correspondence		Coastguard radio working channel	Public correspondence (ship-to-shore duplex) port operations	Public correspondence (ship-to-shore duplex), Independent radio networks	Radiotelephone links between ship stations and land stations of the authorities responsible for the operation of inland waterways (ship-to-shore duplex)
85	157.275	161.875	UKSAR TWC (half-duplex)		Radio telephone – full duplex		Coastguard radio working channel	Public correspondence (ship-to-shore duplex) port operations	Navy	Radiotelephone links between ship stations and land stations of the authorities responsible for the operation of inland waterways (ship-to-shore duplex)
86	157.325	161.925	HM Coastguard Maritime Safety Information: now on 62, 63, 64.				Coastguard radio working channel	Public correspondence (ship-to-shore duplex) port operations	Navy	Radiotelephone links between ship stations and land stations of the authorities responsible for the operation of inland waterways (ship-to-shore duplex)
87	157.375	157.375						Public correspondence port operations	Public correspondence (ship-to-shore duplex), independent radio networks, customs, Coast Guard, search and rescue	Radiotelephone links between ship stations and land stations of the authorities responsible for the operation of inland waterways (ship-to-shore duplex)
88	157.425	157.425						Commercial, inter-ship only	Public correspondence (ship-to-shore duplex), independent radio networks	Radiotelephone links between ship stations and land stations of the authorities responsible for the operation of inland waterways (ship-to-shore duplex)
M2/P4	161.425	161.425	(As M2) Yacht clubs, race committees and marinas							(As P4) In France, some yacht clubs, marinas and race committees
AIS 1	161.975	161.975	Automatic Identification System A B							
AIS 2	162.025	162.025	Automatic Identification System A B							
L1	155.500	155.500						Leisure activities (Ship-to-ship) Used in the Nordic countries and Estonia		
L2	155.525	155.525						Leisure activities (Ship-to-ship) Used in the Nordic countries and Estonia		
L3	155.650	155.650						Leisure activities (Ship-to-ship) Used in Finland and Norway		
F1	155.625	155.625						Fishing (Ship-to-ship) Used in the Nordic countries		
F2	155.775	155.775						Fishing (Ship-to-ship) Used in the Nordic countries		
F3	155.825	155.825						Fishing, also recreational fishing (Ship-to-ship) Used in the Nordic countries		

== Operating procedure ==
Marine VHF mostly uses half-duplex audio equipment and non-relayed transmissions. Ship to ship communication is over a single radio frequency (simplex), while ship to shore often uses full duplex frequency pairs, however the transceivers are usually half-duplex devices that cannot receive when transmitting even on a full-duplex channel. To transmit the user presses a "push to talk" button on the set or microphone which turns the transmitter on and the receiver off in a device with half-duplex audio, even on a full-duplex radio channel; on devices with full-duplex audio the receiver is left on while transmitting on a full-duplex radio channel. Communication can take place in both directions simultaneously on full-duplex channels when the equipment on both ends allows it. Full duplex channels can be used to place calls over the public telephone network for a fee via a marine operator. When equipment supporting full-duplex audio is used, the call is similar to one using a mobile phone or landline. When half-duplex is used, voice is only carried one way at a time and the party on the boat must press the transmit button only when speaking. This facility is still available in some areas, though its use has largely died out with the advent of mobile and satellite phones. Marine VHF radios can also receive weather radio broadcasts, where they are available.

The accepted conventions for use of marine radio are collectively termed "proper operating procedure". These international conventions include:

- Stations should listen for 30 seconds before transmitting and not interrupt other stations.
- Maintaining a watch listening on Channel 16 when not otherwise using the radio. All calls are established on channel 16, except for distress working switch to a working ship-to-ship or ship-to-shore channel. (procedure varies in the U.S. only when calls can be established on Ch. 9)
- During distress operations silence maintained on ch. 16 for other traffic until the channel is released by the controlling station using the pro-word "Silence Fini". If a station does use Ch. 16 during distress operations controlling station issues the command "silence mayday".
- Using a set of international "calling" procedures such as the "Mayday" distress call, the "Pan-pan" urgency call and "Sécurité" navigational hazard call.
- Using "pro-words" based on the English language such as Acknowledge, All after, All before, All stations, Confirm, Correct, Correction, In figures, In letters, Over, Out, Radio check, Read back, Received, Say again, Spell, Standby, Station calling, This is, Wait, Word after, Word before, Wrong (local language is used for some of these, when talking to local stations)
- Using the NATO phonetic alphabet: Alfa, Bravo, Charlie, Delta, Echo, Foxtrot, Golf, Hotel, India, Juliett, Kilo, Lima, Mike, November, Oscar, Papa, Quebec, Romeo, Sierra, Tango, Uniform, Victor, Whiskey, X-ray, Yankee, Zulu
- Using a phonetic numbering system based on the English language or a combination of English and Roman languages: Wun, Too, Tree, Fow-er, Fife, Six, Sev-en, Ait, Nin-er, Zero, Decimal; alternatively in marine communication: unaone, bissotwo, terrathree, kartefour, pantafive, soxisix, setteseven, oktoeight, novenine, nadazero

Slightly adjusted regulations can apply for inland shipping, such as the Basel rules (de:Regionale Vereinbarung über den Binnenschifffahrtsfunk) in Western Europe.

== Future ==
In 2022, the ETSI issued a proposal for implementing the use of FDMA protocols on the band in response to increasingly scarce availability of voice channels in some circumstances owing to the widespread use of systems such as AIS. The plan includes significantly narrower 6.25 kHz channel spacing, and would support voice and data applications.

== See also ==
- 2182 kHz
- Automated Maritime Telecommunications System
- Maritime mobile amateur radio
- Radio horizon
- Ship-to-shore
