= CQD =

Morse code distress call in the early 20th century

CQD in Morse code

CQD (transmitted in Morse code as ▄▄▄ ▄ ▄▄▄ ▄ ▄▄▄ ▄▄▄ ▄ ▄▄▄ ▄▄▄ ▄ ▄ ) is one of the first distress signals adopted for radio use. On 7 January 1904 the Marconi International Marine Communication Company issued "Circular 57", which specified that, for the company's installations, beginning 1 February 1904 "the call to be given by ships in distress or in any way requiring assistance shall be 'C Q D'".

== Background ==
Landline and submarine telegraphers had adopted the convention of using the station code "CQ" for a general transmission addressed to all stations along a telegraph line. As the overwhelming majority of initial wireless operators had been working as wired telegraphers for years, the existing station code CQ was naturally adopted as a "general call" to any wireless telegraph station, on land or at sea.

The Marconi company added a "D" ("distress") to CQ in order to create the distress call "CQD"; understood by wireless operators to mean All stations: Distress. (Note: Contrary to popular belief, CQD does not stand for "Come Quick, Danger", "Come Quickly: Distress", "Come Quick – Drowning!", or "C Q Danger" ("Seek You, Danger"); these are backronyms.) Although used worldwide by Marconi operators, CQD was never adopted as an international standard, since it could easily be mistaken for a mere general call "CQ" when reception is poor.

== Replacement ==
At the first International Radiotelegraphic Convention, held in Berlin in 1906, Germany's Notzeichen distress signal of three-dots three-dashes three-dots ( ▄ ▄ ▄ ▄▄▄ ▄▄▄ ▄▄▄ ▄ ▄ ▄ ) was adopted as the international Morse code distress signal.

This signal soon became known as SOS because it has the same dash-dot sequence as the letters with the gaps between them removed, and in fact is properly written S̅O̅S̅, with an overbar, to distinguish it from the three individual letters. In contrast, CQD is transmitted as three distinct letters with a short gap between each, like regular text. SOS is also easier to hear as it is nine symbols long, while no other character or sign is longer than six symbols. Germany had first adopted SOS in regulations effective 1 April 1905.

== History of wireless distress rescues ==
From 1899 to 1908, nine documented rescues were made by the use of wireless. The earliest of these was a distress call from the East Goodwin lightship. However, for the earliest of these, there was no standardized distress signal. The first US ship to send a wireless distress call in 1905 simply sent HELP (in both International Morse and American Morse code).

On 7 December 1903, Ludwig Arnson was a wireless operator aboard the liner SS Kroonland when the ship lost a propeller off the Irish coast. His call of CQD brought aid from a British cruiser. In 1944 Arnson received the Marconi Memorial Medal of Achievement of the Veteran Wireless Operators Association, in recognition of his sending the first CQD wireless distress signal from an American vessel. By February 1904, the Marconi Wireless Company required all its operators to use CQD for a ship in distress or for requiring URGENT assistance. In the early morning of 23 January 1909, whilst sailing into New York from Liverpool, RMS Republic collided with the Italian liner SS Florida in fog off the Massachusetts island of Nantucket. Radio Operator Jack Binns sent the CQD distress signal by Wireless transmission.

On 15 April 1912, RMS Titanic radio operator Jack Phillips initially sent "CQD", which was still commonly used by British ships. Harold Bride, the junior radio operator, suggested using S̅O̅S̅, saying half-jokingly that it might be his last chance to use the new code. Phillips thereafter began to alternate between the two. Although Bride survived, Phillips perished in the sinking.

== See also ==
- 500 kHz (Morse distress frequency)
- 2182 kHz (voice distress frequency)
- Global Maritime Distress and Safety System
- Mayday
- Prosigns for Morse code

== Bibliography ==
- Dubreuil, Stephan (1998). Come quick, danger : a history of marine radio in Canada. Ottawa: Fisheries and Oceans Canada, Coast Guard. ISBN 978-0-660-17490-7. OCLC 39748172.
- Caesar, Pete (1977). SOS ... CQD : four ships in trouble. Muskegon, Mich.: Marine Press. OCLC 3182026.
