= VS-17 =

Signaling device used by military personnel

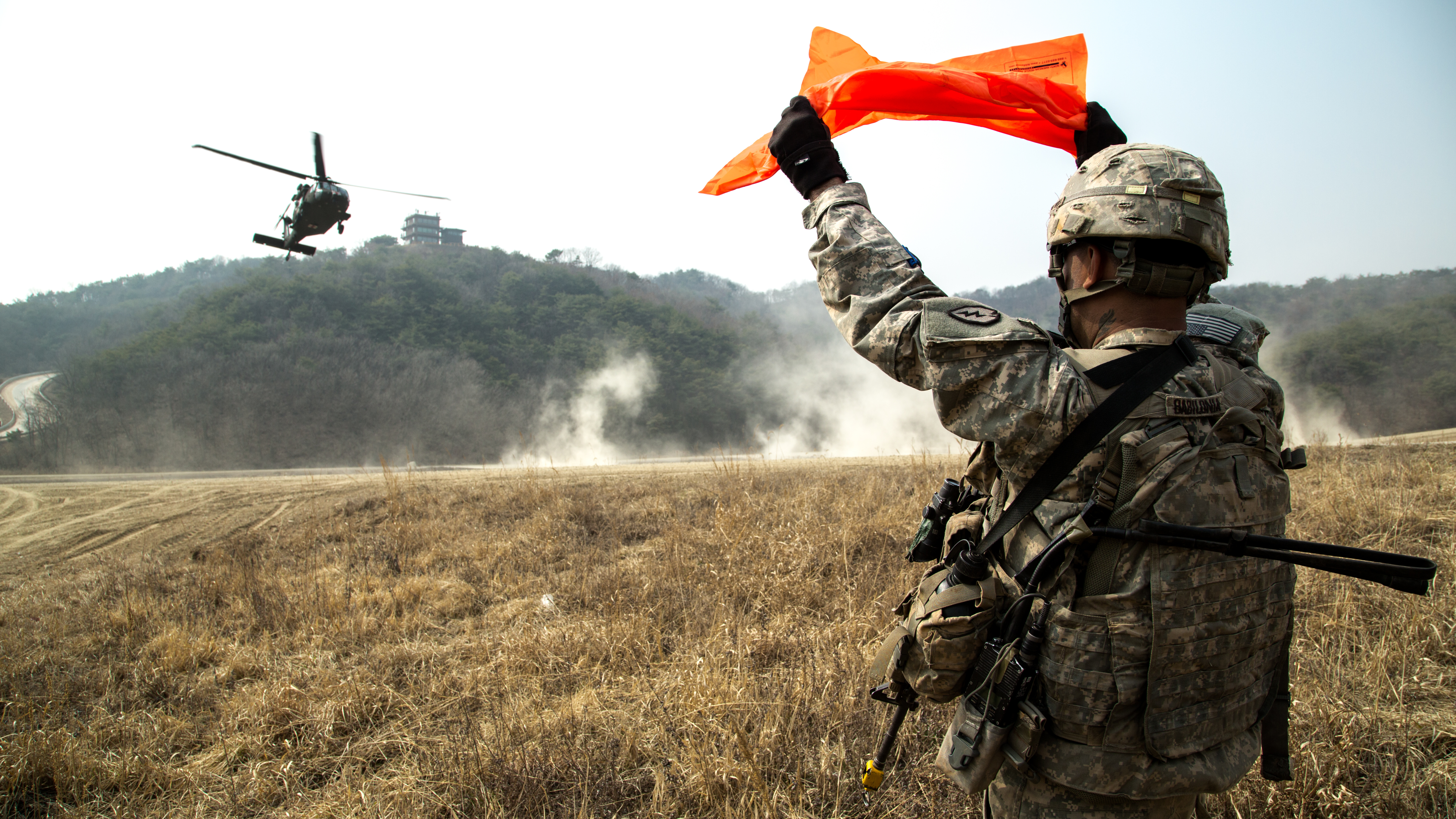
A U.S. soldier uses a VS-17 panel to signal an approaching helicopter during an exercise, 2015

The VS-17 is a signaling device used by military personnel to send signals to aircraft, and to mark improvised landing sites.

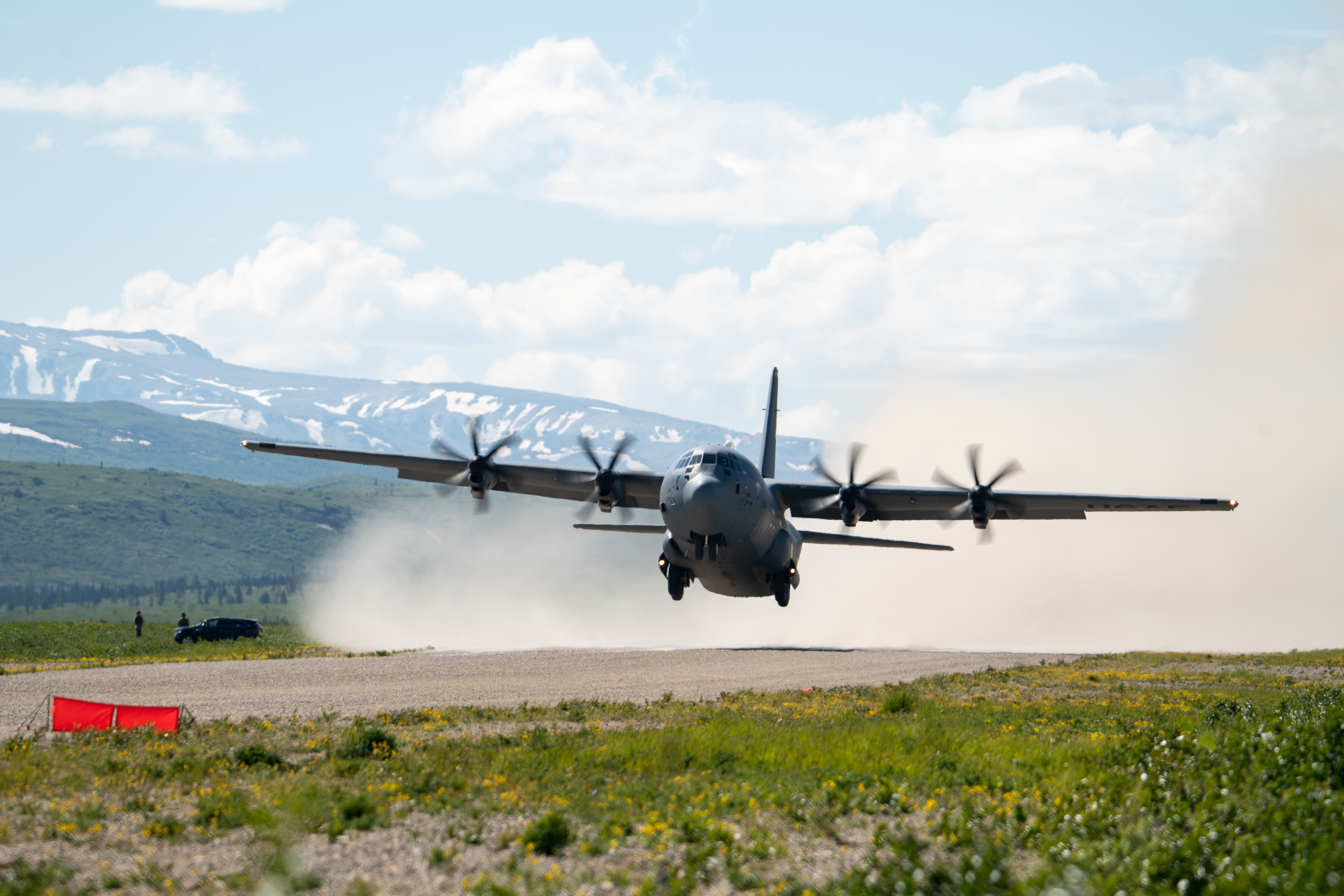
VS-17 panels (lower left corner) are used to mark an unimproved landing site for a C-130J Hercules, 2022

The VS-21 is a replacement for the VS-17 that provides an infrared signature, allowing use in low visibility conditions via thermal imaging.

== See also ==
- Air-to-ground communication
- Air navigation
- Signal square
