= RMS Slavonia =

British passenger liner that was first to use the SOS code

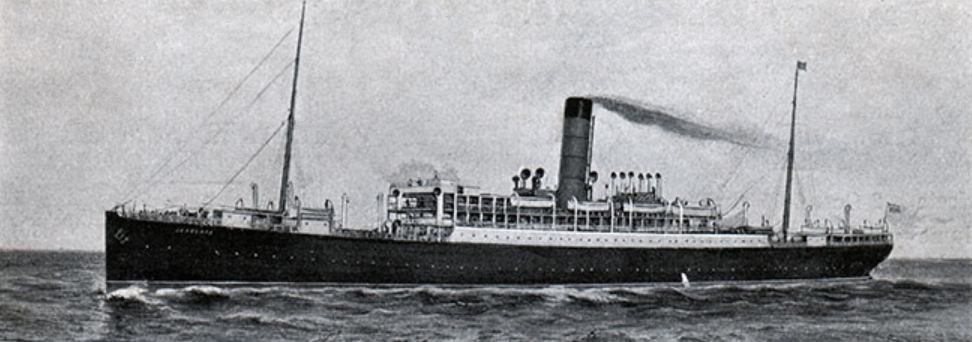

History

United Kingdom
- Name: Yamuna (1902–03); Slavonia (1903–09)
- Namesake: Yamuna; Slavonia
- Owner: British India Line 1902–3; Cunard Line 1903–9
- Operator: British India Line 1902–3; Cunard Line 1903–9
- Port of registry: Liverpool, United Kingdom
- Builder: Sir J. Laing & Sons
- Yard number: 600
- Launched: 15 November 1902
- Completed: June 1903
- Fate: Wrecked 10 June 1909

General characteristics
- Type: Passenger ship
- Tonnage: 8,831 GRT (1902–03); 10,606 GRT, 6,724 NRT (1903–09)
- Length: 510 feet 0 inches (155.44 m)
- Beam: 59 feet 6 inches (18.13 m)
- Installed power: Triple expansion steam engines
- Propulsion: Twin screw propellers
- Speed: 13 knots (24 km/h)
- Capacity: 40 first class and 800 steerage class passengers (1902–03); 71 first class, 74 second class and 1,954 steerage class passengers (1903–09)
- Crew: 225

Slavonia was a 10,606 GRT passenger ship that was built in 1902 as Yamuna for the British India Line. She was sold to the Cunard Line in 1903 and renamed Slavonia. In 1909, she ran aground in the Azores; soon after, she sent an SOS, the first time a ship used this code. All on board were rescued and the ship was declared a total loss.

== Description ==
As built, the ship was 510 feet 0 inches (155.44 m) long, with a beam of 59 feet 6 inches (18.13 m). She was equipped with triple expansion steam engines, which were built by the Wallsend Slipway Co Ltd. These drove twin screw propellers and could propel the ship at 13 knots (24 km/h). She was assessed at 8,831 GRT. Accommodation for 40 first class and 800 steerage class passengers was provided.

== History ==
Yamuna was built as yard number 600 by Sir J. Laing & Co Ltd, Sunderland, County Durham for the British India Steam Navigation Company. She was launched on 15 November 1902, when she was christened by Lady Stewart (wife of Lieutenant-General Sir Richard Stewart), and completed in June 1903. She was the largest ship built at a British shipyard for eleven years, and the largest ever to be launched on the River Wear. The United Kingdom Official Number 115761 was allocated. In 1904, she was sold to the Cunard Line and renamed Slavonia. She was used on the service between the Mediterranean and New York, United States. This service had been introduced as a temporary measure in the autumn of 1903 and was subsequently made permanent. After a refit, she was assessed at 10,606 GRT, 6,724 NRT. Its port of registry was Liverpool, Lancashire. Accommodation for 71 first class, 74 second class and 1,954 steerage class passengers was provided. Her crew numbered 225. Lifesaving equipment comprised twelve lifeboats, seven collapsible lifeboats and two other boats. She carried 24 lifebuoys and 2,340 lifebelts. Slavonia made her maiden voyage for Cunard Line on 17 March 1904, sailing from Sunderland to New York via Trieste and Fiume, Austrian Empire and Palermo, Italy.

== Shipwreck ==
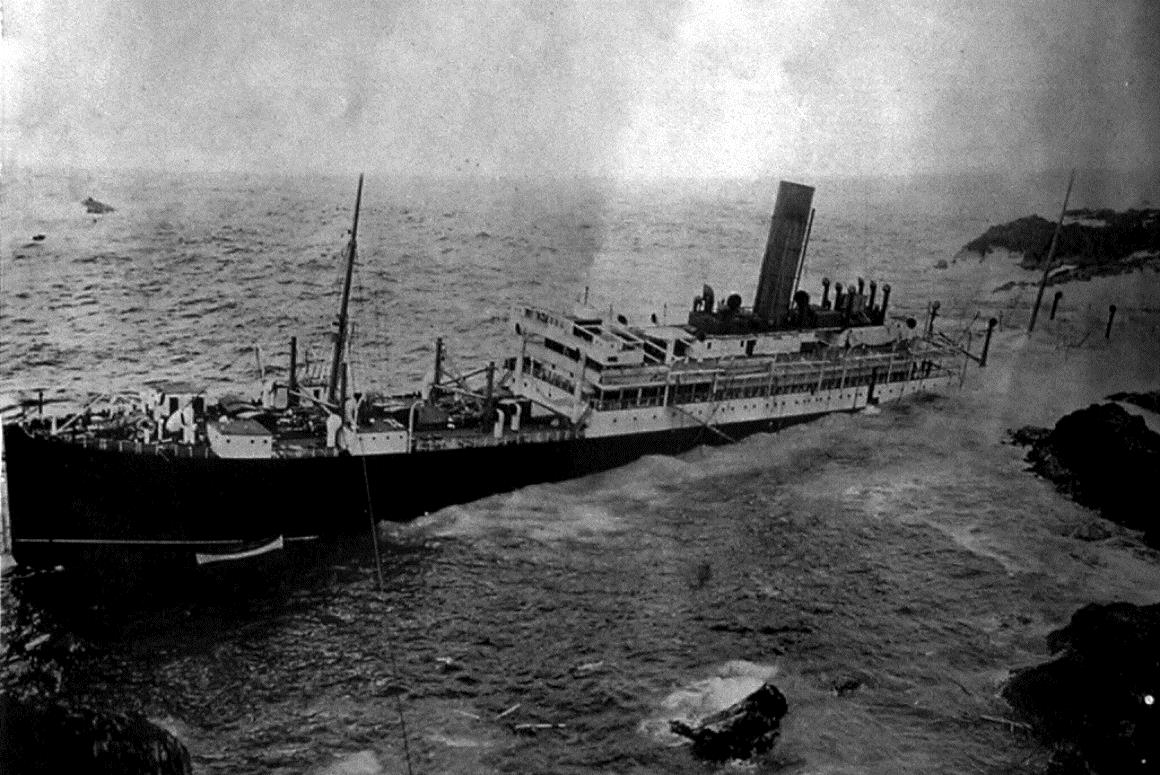
The wrecked RMS Slavonia, photographed on 10 June 1909

Slavonia departed from New York City on 3 June 1909 under Captain A.G. Dunning on what would be her final voyage. On 10 June, Slavonia ran aground in foggy weather at Ponta dos Fenais, Flores, Azores, Portugal. An SOS was sent, the first use of this code. All on board were rescued by Prinzess Irene and Batavia. Prinzess Irene took off 110 cabin class passengers. Batavia took off 300 steerage class passengers, leaving the crew on board. They left the ship later that day. The wreck was subsequently looted. Prinzess Irene landed some of the rescued passengers at Gibraltar. The 84 remaining on board travelled on to Naples, Italy, where they arrived on 17 June. Those rescued by Batavia reached Naples on 19 June.

Furniture from Slavonia

Slavonia was abandoned and declared a total loss. She was insured for £90,000. Some of her cargo was salvaged - 400 bags of coffee, 1,000 ingots of copper and 200 casks of oil. Also salvaged were 25 pieces of agricultural machinery and miscellaneous ships' stores. They were taken to Liverpool, Lancashire by Letty. A Board of Trade inquiry was held into the loss of Slavonia. The captain's explanation for navigating so close to the Azores was to provide a bit of scenery, relieving the monotony of an ocean voyage, and at the same time assuaging some of the passengers land was close by. Though her captain did not lose his license, he was severely reprimanded for being 10.5 nautical miles (19.4 km) off course and going at an excessive speed for the prevailing conditions.

The moral of the case, as we have already suggested, is that if shipmasters choose to navigate unfamiliar waters they must neglect no precaution which should commend itself to the mind of the careful mariner. For all that, there will be widespread regret that a well-meaning effort to popularize the line which he served should have ended so disastrously for so experienced and so highly esteemed a navigator.

— Lloyd's List, pages 7-8 (1909-09-24)

The Board of Trade awarded the captains of Batavia and Prinzess Irene a piece of plate in recognition of their efforts to rescue the passengers of Slavonia. The person in charge of the wireless station on Flores also received a piece of plate. His two assistants were awarded a sum of money each.
