= Maritime mobile amateur radio =

Amateur radio in maritime applications

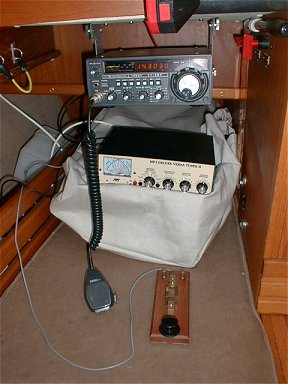
An amateur radio installation on a 28' yacht, including 100W HF transceiver with microphone, manual antenna tuner, and morse key

Maritime mobile amateur radio is an amateur radio transmission license that allows maritime operators to install and use radio while they operating at sea. The call sign of operators is extended by adding the suffix "MM" when transmitting at sea.

== Licensing ==
The following notes are made with regard to the UK "Full" amateur radio licence terms, provisions and limitations, and so may vary slightly from other amateur licenses.

Maritime mobile operation is defined as operating a transmitter that is located on any vessel at sea. This means any occupied structure afloat outside the high-water mark. Operating on vessels on inland waterways is defined as mobile work, and so requires /M to be added to the callsign, not /MM as for maritime mobile operations.

There is a requirement that the amateur radio equipment must only be installed with the written permission of the vessel's master. This does not affect those who intend to install a transceiver on their own boat, but is relevant to anyone who intends to make transmissions from a ferry or other passenger ship. In such cases, the master of the ship has the right to demand radio silence from the amateur operator. There is no requirement to keep a log of calls, but a written record of information about frequencies, times, operators and their callsigns can be valuable.

It is not a requirement that the station transmit its location, but of course, this is advisable, and easy to do with on-board GPS location. UK amateurs have a system of regional secondary locators that they must use within UK territorial waters (e.g. adding D for the Isle of Man, M for Scotland etc. in the second position in their callsign). In international waters, this is not necessary. When in the territorial waters of other countries, CEPT rules apply and these can get complex. The normal procedure is to prepend the national locator of the host country to the normal callsign, separated with another slash. So, amateur station A0AA, operating from a vessel within the territorial tidal waters of a country identified by the prefix B, would identify itself as B/A0AA/MM when transmitting.

In international waters, amateur licensees must only use frequency bands allocated internationally in each of the three ITU Regions. In any country's territorial waters, they should abide by the frequency allocations and bandplans applicable to the host country.

== Maritime Mobile Nets ==
Many sophisticated radio networks are regularly operated by shore-based volunteers for operators.

Maritime mobile amateur radio networks
	Frequency (MHz)	Time(s) (UTC)	Operator(s)	Notes
Transatlantic maritime mobile net	21.400	1300	Trudi (8P6QM)	Based in Barbados, Atlantic crossing
Worldwide weather net	21.303	1300	Neville (G3LMO), Richard (KT4UW), Don (6Y5DA)	
UK maritime mobile net	14.303 (14.306)	0800 1800	Bill (G4FRN, sk), Bruce (G4YZH), Tony (G0IAD) and others.	2E0NWE (Owen) is seeking volunteers to reestablish the Net. Pse contact him via QRZ.com to volunteer.
Mississauga maritime net	14.121	0745 local time, i.e. 1145 (Canadian summer time) or 1245 GMT	Doug (VE3NBL), Ernie (VE3EGM)	Based in Canada, Atlantic crossing
Caribbean maritime mobile net	7.241	1100	Lou (KV4JC)	Caribbean cruising
Caribbean weather net	7.086	1120	George (KP2G)	Caribbean weather information
INTERMAR German maritime mobile service net	14.313	0800 1630	Klaus (DJ3CD), Armin (DL8AH), Ruettger (DL8MEZ), Ruediger (DJ9UE)	daily all Oceans
PIN - COSTA RICA PANAMA PACIFIC ISLAND NET	14.135	0200	Gunter (TI7WGI)	Pacific Atlantic
The Maritime Mobile Service Network	14.300	1700-0300 (winter) 1600-0200 (summer)	Net Manager is Jeff Savasta, KB4JKL, with over 70 net controllers	Atlantic, Caribbean and E. Pacific. Position reports posted on request.
ANAVRE Spanish maritime mobile service net	14.323	1630 2230	Ignacio (EA4FZZ), Manel (EA3CBQ)	daily Med. & Northeast Atlantic
South African Maritime Mobile Net (SAMMNet)	7.120 14.316	0635 1135 0630 1130	Peter Wolf (ZS1CH), Woody Collett (ZS3WL), Marjoke Schuitemaker (ZS5V), Johan Smith (ZS6WZ),	Marine weather bulletins for coastal areas (40 m band) and the high seas (METAREA VII) (20 m band), Maritime Mobile station communication,

== Technical considerations ==
There are some special considerations when installing and using amateur radio transmitters and receivers afloat. These include power supply, RF earth, antenna design and EMC (electromagnetic compatibility) with other electronic equipment aboard.

=== Antenna design and installation ===
For MF and HF use, the most common antenna design is to add two RF insulators into the backstay of the mast and feed it from the transceiver using a sintered bronze earthing plate, bolted to the outside of the hull, well under the waterline, as an earth. On metal-hulled boats, the earth plate can be dispensed with, and the whole hull used as a ground. In this case, the thickness of any paint layer is entirely negligible at RF. On a yacht with twin backstays, if insulators are placed in both of them, and they are fed from the masthead, they may be usable as an "inverted vee" avoiding the need to feed the antenna against ground. Either format will require the use of an ATU (Antenna Tuning Unit) to achieve resonance for the HF frequency in use, as the physical length of the antenna will almost invariably be incorrect at the frequency of choice. A few twin-masted sailing vessels have the space to erect a "Tee" antenna or an inverted "L" between masts. These antenna configurations are more common on merchant ships.

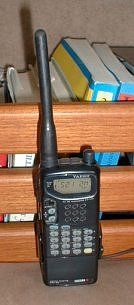
A handheld amateur VHF radio transceiver ready for "maritime mobile" use on a 28' yacht.

For VHF and UHF operation, one option is to mount a small Yagi antenna to a pole 1–2 m (3–6 ft) long and haul this to the masthead using a flag halyard. If the halyard is correctly knotted to the middle and bottom of the pole, it is easy enough to make the antenna project above the clutter at the masthead into clear air. The problem is in rotating it - it usually needs to be lowered and re-raised to alter the direction of its beam. For the safety of masthead fittings and lights it is better if these yagis are light in weight and made largely of, for example, plastic tubes supporting internal wire conductors. Operating in this way is best reserved for when in harbour or at anchor, to avoid interfering with the operation of the boat. Repeated loss of signal due to rolling and pitching would make it impractical for useful communication at sea anyway.

For FM operation on the 2 m band, the masthead vertical whip that is normally installed for marine VHF operation will provide good omni-directional, vertically polarised signals. The frequency of operation around 145 MHz is close enough to the antenna's design frequency of 156 MHz that most amateur transceivers will not need an ATU and will not suffer unduly from a poor (high) SWR.

=== Earthing ===
For a single-ended HF antenna, a good electrical earth connection is essential. It is also necessary from the points of view of safety and EMC considerations on any radio transmitter installation on a boat or ship. As mentioned above, metal-hulled vessels have a natural advantage in that, especially at HF and lower frequencies, the hull can be considered to be in contact with the water, as the insulating properties of the paint layer against the water is a capacitance that presents very little electrical impedance to the RF currents. For fibreglass and wooden hulls and HF transmission, the usual solution is to attach a sintered bronze plate to the outside of the hull for RF earthing. The construction of a sintered bronze plate is porous to water, so that although the plate may be only a square foot or two and an inch thick, the actual surface area of metal in electrical contact with the water is very many times that.

Once a good connection to the sea water has been established, it is necessary to make a good RF connection from the transceiver and ATU to the grounding system. For large RF currents copper grounding tape is recommended rather than thick wire. This is not because thick wires will not be able to support the currents involved, but because it is more likely that RF currents will remain flowing along something that has a wide surface area without re-transmitting themselves along the way due to skin effect. The key pathway from the ATU of a single-ended antenna system to the earthing plate, or the hull earth-point, should be as short and as straight as possible. This should be considered from the start when deciding where to mount the various components within the hull. There is not much that the installer can do about the losses in, and the efficiencies of, the transceiver, the ATU, the antenna or its feed, but extra effort put into the efficiency of the earthing paths will pay much bigger dividends, in terms of radiated power and freedom from EMC problems later, than any other single aspect of the installation. The salty sea makes an exceptionally good ground plane.

=== Safety and EMC ===
A modern sailing boat, or any other modern seagoing craft, is a much more complex electronic environment than ever in the past, and even more so than a normal home-based amateur radio "shack". The vessel may have electronic navigation instruments, one or more GPS receivers, electronic automatic steering, domestic radio and perhaps television receivers as well as probably radar and VHF transmitters and receivers too. It may have various GMDSS devices too, such as a Navtex receiver and an AIS system. Many of these items are computerised and many of them are networked together with data, RF and power connections.

The antenna lead is a transmitting antenna from the point where it leaves the relevant terminal on the HF ATU. It is not possible to prevent RF radiation from this lead. Typically it is a specialist, high voltage insulated, single core wire, rigidly mounted well away from other wiring and outside any conducting faraday cage, taking the shortest and straightest possible route to the point where it connects to the external antenna, whether a whip or an insulated part of the standing rigging.

As discussed above, good earthing is essential in the installation of transmitting equipment, and good RF management will also pay dividends in terms of the ability to use other electronic equipment while transmitting, without damage to the other gear, or debilitating interference in the other gear during transmissions. It may be possible to disengage electronic steering and switch off or do without navigation instruments while the radio operator aboard makes a scheduled call, but others aboard will be much more grateful if this is not necessary and life aboard can continue as normal while people gather around the transceiver to hear news from ashore and from other boats, as well as weather or other important routing information.

== See also ==
- Amateur radio
- Marine and mobile radio telephony
- Satellite Internet access
