= Vessel emergency codes =

Coded messages used over public address systems on passenger ships

In addition to distress signals like Mayday and pan-pan, most vessels, especially passenger ships, use some emergency signals to alert the crew on board. In some cases, the signals may alert the passengers to danger, but, in others, the objective is to conceal the emergency from unaffected passengers so as to avoid panic or undue alarm. Signals can be in the form of blasts on alarm bells, sounds on the ship's whistle or code names paged over the PA system.

- Alpha, alpha, alpha is the code for a medical emergency aboard Royal Caribbean and Norwegian ships.
- Alpha Team, Alpha Team, Alpha Team is the code for a fire emergency aboard Carnival Cruise Line ships.
- Bravo, bravo, bravo is used by many cruise lines to alert crew to a fire or other serious incident on board without alarming passengers.
- Operation Brightstar designates a medical emergency, such as cardiac arrest or stroke on Carnival and Disney cruise line vessels. It can only be requested to be announced by one of the medical team or an officer with advanced medical training. The spoken word Brightstar over the PA, sometimes supplemented by a group signal on the pager system will alert the medical team including all doctors and nurses to attend the location. The ventilation officer (VO) is also alerted during a Brightstar. The VO will start the power to the cooling in the morgue (presuming it is not already in use) as a precaution.
- Charlie, Charlie, Charlie is the code for a security threat aboard Royal Caribbean ships and the code for upcoming helicopter winch operations aboard c-bed accommodation vessels.
- Code blue usually means a medical emergency.
- Delta, delta, delta is the code for a possible bio-hazard among some cruise lines. More commonly used to alert crew to hull damage on board some lines as well.
- Echo, echo, echo is the code for a possible collision with another ship or the shore aboard Royal Caribbean ships, or if the ship is starting to drift. On board some cruise lines this means danger of high winds while at port. It alerts the crew responsible for the gangway, thrusters etc. to get into position and be ready for new maneuvers.
- Fire and emergency, continuous ringing of the general alarm bell and a continuous sounding of the ship's whistle for at least ten seconds but usually much longer.
- Kilo, Kilo, Kilo on Royal Caribbean is a general signal for crew to report to emergency stations.
- Mr Mob (pronounced Mister M-O-B, not Mr. Mob) means man overboard. Man overboard can also be signaled with three prolonged blasts on the ship's whistle and general alarm bell (Morse code "Oscar").
- Mr Skylight, paged over the public address system, is an alert for the crew on board and means there is an emergency somewhere.
  - "Mr Skylight" was issued during the Sinking of the MS Estonia. On the MS Estonia the alarm had different suffixes which were used to ask different groups of employees to perform tasks. The report into the sinking stated that the alarm during the accident voyage was used to alert to fire and to do "mustering the command group and the lifeboat groups simultaneously." The report stated that the particular usage during the accident voyage, when it was already apparent to passengers that something was wrong, "was not so well suited to the situation" and "inappropriate and late".
- Oscar, Oscar, Oscar is the code for man overboard aboard Royal Caribbean and Celebrity ships.
- Purell, Purell, Purell followed by a location is for cleanup (vomit) on Celebrity ships.
- Red Parties, Red Parties, Red Parties is used by Disney Cruise Line over the PA system to alert the crew of a fire or possible fire on board the ship.
- Star code, star code, star code is a code for a medical emergency aboard Celebrity ships.
- Zulu, Zulu, Zulu is the code for a fight aboard most cruise lines.

== See also ==
- Hospital emergency codes
