= Sécurité =

Maritime emergency radio signal

Sécurité (/seɪˈkjʊərɪteɪ/; French: sécurité) (often repeated thrice, "Sécurité, sécurité, sécurité") is a procedure word used in the maritime radio service that warns the crew that the following message is important safety information. The most common use of this is by coast radio stations before the broadcast of navigational warnings and meteorological information.

Navigational warnings are issued regularly and usually give information about people or vessels in distress and objects or events that can be an immediate danger to people at sea and how they are navigating. In the United States, MARAD (Marine Administration) sends out infrequent advisories about potential global political climate dangers. There are four types of navigational warnings, which are categorized by their location. These areas are NAVAREA IV, HYDROLANT, NAVAREA XII, and HYDROPAC.

Meteorological information is information that is about the marine atmosphere. These meteorological advisories include the development of weather systems such as and not limited to, rain squalls, big tidal drops, major current shifts, lightning storms, hurricane and tsunami warnings, high winds, and cyclones.

It is normal practice to broadcast the Sécurité call itself on a distress and listening frequency such as VHF Channel 16 or MF 2182 kHz, and then change frequency to a working channel for the body of the messages. An equivalent Morse code signal is TTT, with each letter sent distinctly.

Although mostly used by coast radio stations, there is nothing to stop individual craft broadcasting their own Sécurité messages where appropriate, for example, a yacht becalmed (rendered motionless for lack of wind), or any vessel adrift or unable to manoeuvre near other craft or shipping lanes.

== Mayday, pan-pan, sécurité ==
Of the three distress and urgency calls, Sécurité is the least urgent.

Sécurité: A radio call that usually issues navigational warnings, meteorological warnings, and any other warning needing to be issued that may concern the safety of life at sea, yet may not be particularly life-threatening.

Pan-pan: This is the second most important call. This call is made when there is an emergency aboard a vessel, yet there is not immediate danger to life, or the safety of the vessel itself. This includes, but is not limited to injuries on deck, imminent collision that has not yet occurred, or being unsure of vessel's position.

Mayday: This is the most important call that can be made, due to the fact that it directly concerns a threat to life or the vessel. Some instances when this call would be made are, but not limited to death, collision, and fire at sea. When the Mayday call is made, the vessel is requiring immediate assistance.

== Example usage ==
Third on the list of calls, a Safety or Sécurité call takes priority of all communications besides distress and urgency. The DSC safety alert should not be acknowledged by voice, but merely listened to and noted. The proper etiquette for sending a safety alert is as follows: first, the DSC safety alert must be sent on Channel 16 VHF or at 2182 kHz instead of using a working channel or frequency. Second, the targeted group must be selected, if necessary. This can be all ships, ships of a specific geographic area, or an individual ship. Lastly, the call should be made. GMDSS protocol requires that the safety call must be spoken to attract attention of the selected vessels. Procedure for the call is:

SÉCURITÉ x 3

ALL STATIONS x 3

THIS IS (Ship/Station Identification) x 3

Without a break, continue on to the safety message:

SÉCURITÉ

NAME, CALLSIGN, MMSI

POSITION

NATURE OF SAFETY MESSAGE

ADVICE/OTHER INFORMATION

“OUT”

== See also ==
- Mayday (distress signal)
- Pan-pan
- Procedure word
- Maritime radio
- Marine VHF radio
- Global Maritime Distress and Safety System
- Marine weather forecasting
- Morse code
