= Pan-pan =

Distress signal used in radiotelephone communications

The radiotelephony message PAN-PAN is the international standard distress signal that someone aboard a boat, ship, aircraft, or other vehicle uses to declare that they need help and that the situation is urgent, but for the time being, does not pose an immediate danger to anyone's life or to the vessel itself. This is referred to as a state of "urgency". This is distinct from a mayday call, which means that there is imminent danger to life or to the continued viability of the vessel itself. Radioing "pan-pan" informs potential rescuers (including emergency services and other craft in the area) that an urgent problem exists, whereas "mayday" calls on them to drop all other activities and immediately begin a rescue.

The Morse code signal "XXX" ( ▄▄▄ ▄ ▄ ▄▄▄ ▄▄▄ ▄ ▄ ▄▄▄ ▄▄▄ ▄ ▄ ▄▄▄ ), which has the same meaning that "pan-pan" does in radiotelephony, was first defined by the International Radiotelegraph Convention of 1927.

== Etymology ==
As with "mayday" (from venez m'aider, "come help me"), the urgency signal pan-pan derives from the French language. In French, a panne [pan] is a breakdown, such as a mechanical failure. In English, it is sometimes pronounced as /pɑːn/ PAHN and sometimes as /pæn/ PAN.

A three-letter backronym, "possible assistance needed" or "pay attention now", derives from pan. Maritime and aeronautical radio communications courses use those as mnemonics to convey the important difference between mayday and pan-pan.

== Usage ==
To declare pan-pan correctly, the caller repeats it three times: "Pan-pan, pan-pan, pan-pan", then states the intended recipient, either "all stations, all stations, all stations", or a specific station, e.g. "Victoria Coast Guard Radio, Victoria Coast Guard Radio, Victoria Coast Guard Radio". Then the caller states their craft's identification, position, nature of the problem, and the type of assistance or advice they require, if any.

=== Medical transports ===
The phrase "PAN-PAN MEDICAL" is reserved for medical transports. It is used to announce and identify medical transports.

=== Medical advice ===
One special case of "pan-pan" is to ask for medical advice. This is a normal "pan-pan" call that includes a phrase such as "request medical advice" and the craft identification, position, and nature of the medical problem. It should not be confused with the term "PAN-PAN MEDICAL" which is reserved for medical transports.

This type of call is specifically for getting a physician's advice for a medical problem that does not, in the opinion of the skipper or master of the vessel, seem life-threatening. The phrase "pan-pan medico" appears in some older reference books, but is not a correct usage.

Once patched through, a physician or other medical expert on land or in another vessel typically asks the radio operator to detail the symptoms and history of the condition, and provide any available patient medical history. The physician typically recommends first aid treatment and gives other advice based on what resources are available on board. In some cases, the medical issue may be urgent enough to escalate the pan-pan to a mayday call for immediate intervention by rescuers, if possible.

=== Nautical uses ===
Examples of the correct use of a "pan-pan" call from a boat or ship may include the following cases, provided the skipper or master remains confident they can handle the situation, and that there is no current danger to the life of any person or to the safety of the vessel. Once the urgent situation that led to the pan-pan broadcast is resolved or contended with, conventional practice is for the station that initiated the pan-pan call to make a followup broadcast to all stations, declaring that the urgent situation no longer exists.

A call that originates as a "pan-pan" signal might be followed by a mayday distress signal if the situation deteriorates to the point of "grave and imminent danger", thus warranting immediate action (intervention, assistance, response) on the part of listeners in accordance with standard operating practices for distress signaling.

Fouled propeller, engine failure or out of fuel
Provided the vessel is now either anchored or under sail and safe from any immediate danger of collision or stranding. The crew may plan to clear the propeller, refuel from an onboard supply, hoist sail, or use alternative propulsion. Alternatively, as part of the pan-pan call, the skipper may request a tow from a suitable vessel, if possible, but without immediate urgency.
Small fire on board – now extinguished
Fire is dangerous afloat, but if it was small and contained, and is now certainly put out, and with no injury to people, then a "pan-pan" call is appropriate to warn others that investigations are underway to establish the extent of the damage, clear the smoke from below, and re-establish passage as soon as possible.
Unsure of position
Provided there is no apparent danger of stranding or hitting rocks, a pan-pan call on marine VHF radio may allow nearby coast-stations, and perhaps other vessels, to triangulate the source of the transmissions and provide a fix and perhaps offer advice on the best course to safety.
Man-overboard recovery
In a man overboard situation, a pan-pan call on very high frequency (VHF) makes other nearby vessels aware of the situation and ensures that they keep a lookout, avoid coming too close, avoid excessive wake or otherwise interfering. It also alerts them that the recovery vessel is manoeuvring for urgent life-saving, and therefore may not manoeuvre in accordance with International Regulations for Preventing Collisions at Sea (COLREGS). In a more critical situation – the recovery vessel has lost sight of the person overboard, the person overboard is unconscious, there is a danger of hypothermia, or other grave risk to life – a mayday call is more appropriate, so that other nearby vessels can help rather than keep clear.
Overdue vessel
The Canadian and United States Coast Guards (and likely similar maritime safety agencies in other countries) issue "urgent marine information broadcasts" concerning vessels reported overdue, as part of the process of a 'communications search' or 'pre-com' phase of uncertain, possible distress, as determined under the authority of a maritime rescue co-ordination centre or joint maritime-aeronautical rescue co-ordination centre. The message content, a description of the vessel under the apprehension of being missing, its last known position, the date or time last heard from, and the supposed route or passage plan of the vessel, is preceded by the procedure words pan-pan and is addressed to "all stations". Any stations having information concerning the whereabouts of the named vessel are asked to communicate with and report same to the nearest coast guard station.
Imminent collision alert
A pan-pan call is warranted to attempt urgent radio contact with an approaching vessel that may be in danger or is approaching a dangerous close-quarters situation that would risk collision. This would be a bridge-to-bridge communication, and could be combined with five or more short horn or whistle blasts, which is the "Your intentions are unclear or not understood" signal. A short blast is one second long, compared to a prolonged blast of four to six seconds under the COLREGS. An urgent warning could also be given over the radio, for example, if the called vessel appears unaware that it is at risk of striking a person in a small boat or a swimmer. A loud hailer could also be used along with a radio warning.
Medical assistance
Any immediate risk to life makes a mayday call more appropriate. If the vessel is heading to shore and wants an ambulance crew at the dock, the local coast guard station can arrange this. A physician or other trained medical advisor may also be available on the radio, perhaps by patching through via telephone from ashore or from a nearby vessel. The United Kingdom Radiocommunications Authority at one time promulgated a "pan-pan medico" call for cases where someone needed medical help at sea. However, this was never an international procedure word and is not part of the ITU Radio Regulations (RR) or related international standards (e.g. International Maritime Organization (IMO) or International Civil Aviation Organization (ICAO) procedures).

Marine rescue organisations, such as Coastal Patrol, Coast Guard, and Search and Rescue listen on marine radio frequencies for all distress calls including "pan-pan". These organisations can coordinate or assist and can relay such calls to other stations that may be better able to do so.

=== Aeronautical uses ===
Aeronautical situations that require urgent assistance but do not pose an immediate threat to life include:

- Becoming lost
- A serious aircraft system failure, that requires an immediate change of route or altitude
- An engine failure in a multi-engine aircraft where the aircraft is still able to maintain altitude

Pan-pan calls may be made on the aircraft emergency frequency, but they are more often made on the frequency already in use, or another appropriate frequency.

ICAO Annex 10, Volume V, § 4.1.3.1.1 states "the emergency channel (121.5 MHz) shall be used only for genuine emergency purposes". However, ICAO member states can deviate from this rule. In the United Kingdom, pilots may make "practice PAN" or "training fix" calls. Practice mayday calls are not permitted.

== See also ==
- Sécurité
- SOS
- Vessel emergency codes
