= Mayday =

Emergency procedure word used internationally as a distress signal

Mayday is an emergency procedure word used internationally as a distress signal in voice-procedure radio communications.

It is used to signal a life-threatening emergency primarily by aviators and mariners, but in some countries local organizations such as firefighters, police forces, and transportation organizations also use the term. Convention requires the word be repeated three times in a row during the initial emergency declaration ("Mayday, mayday, mayday").

== History ==
The "mayday" procedure word was conceived as a distress call in the early 1920s by Frederick Stanley Mockford, officer-in-charge of radio at Croydon Airport, England. He had been asked to think of a word that would indicate distress and would easily be understood by all pilots and ground staff in an emergency. Since much of the air traffic at the time was between Croydon and Le Bourget Airport in Paris, he proposed the term "mayday", the phonetic equivalent of the French m'aider.

The phrase itself does sacrifice grammatical accuracy in favour of communicability and recognition. M'aider is literally the infinitive "to help me"; the imperative "help me!" would be Aidez-moi! Accordingly, it is sometimes described as a shortened form of venez m'aider, "come help me".

Following tests, the new procedure word was introduced for cross-Channel flights in February 1923. The previous distress call had been the Morse code signal SOS, but this was not considered suitable for voice communication, "[o]wing to the difficulty of distinguishing the letter 'S' by telephone". A flying boat from the Royal Air Force used the "Mayday" call when it landed in the Channel after an engine failure, obtaining aid from a boat within 20 minutes of the call without any advance notice. In 1927, the International Radiotelegraph Convention of Washington, D.C., adopted the voice call "mayday" as the radiotelephone distress call in addition to the SOS radiotelegraph (Morse code) signal.

== Mayday calls ==
A maritime example: The actual mayday call made by MV Summit Venture when it collided with the Sunshine Skyway Bridge in 1980, causing the bridge to collapse.

A noise-reduced, condensed version of the above MV Summit Venture collision call.

If a mayday call cannot be sent because a radio is not available, a variety of other distress signals and calls for help can be used. Additionally, a mayday call can be sent on behalf of one vessel by another; this is known as a mayday relay.

Civilian aircraft making a mayday call in the United States airspace are encouraged by the Federal Aviation Administration to use the following format, omitting any portions as necessary for expediency or where they are irrelevant (capitalization as in the original source):

Mayday, Mayday, Mayday; (Name of station addressed); Aircraft call sign and type; Nature of emergency; Weather; Pilot's intentions and/or requests; Present position and heading, or if lost then last known position and heading and time when the aircraft was at that position; Altitude or Flight level; Fuel remaining in minutes; Number of people on board; Any other useful information.

Making a false distress call is a criminal offence in many countries, punishable by a fine, restitution, and possible imprisonment.

== Other urgent calls ==
=== Pan-pan ===
"Pan-pan" (from French: panne, "a breakdown") indicates an urgent situation of a lower order than a "grave and imminent threat requiring immediate assistance", such as a mechanical failure or a medical problem. The suffix "medico" originally was to be added by vessels in British waters to indicate a medical problem ("pan-pan medico", repeated three times), or by aircraft declaring a non-life-threatening medical emergency of a passenger in flight, or those operating as protected medical transport in accordance with the Geneva Conventions. "Pan-pan medico" is no longer in official use.

=== Declaring emergency ===
Sometimes the phrase "declaring emergency" is used in aviation, as an alternative to calling "mayday". For example, in 1998 Swissair Flight 111 radioed "Swissair one-eleven heavy is declaring emergency" after their situation had worsened, upgrading from the "pan-pan" which was declared earlier.

However, the International Civil Aviation Organization recommends the use of the standard "pan-pan" and "mayday" calls instead of "declaring an emergency". Cases of pilots using phrases other than "pan-pan" and "mayday" have caused confusion and errors in aircraft handling.

=== Silencing other communications traffic ===
"Seelonce mayday" (using an approximation of the French pronunciation of silence) is a demand that the channel only be used by the vessel/s and authorities involved with the distress. The channel may not be used for normal working traffic until "seelonce feenee" is broadcast. "Seelonce mayday" and "seelonce feenee" may only be sent by the controlling station in charge of the distress. The expression "stop transmitting – mayday" is an aeronautical equivalent of "seelonce mayday". "Seelonce distress" and "prudonce" are no longer in use since ITU WRC-07.

The format for a "seelonce mayday" is MAYDAY, All Stations x3 or [Interfering station] x3, this is [controlling station], SEELONCE MAYDAY.

"Seelonce feenee" (from French silence fini, 'silence finished') means that the emergency situation has been concluded and the channel may now be used normally. "Distress traffic ended" is the aeronautical equivalent of "seelonce feenee".

The format for the "seelonce feenee" is MAYDAY, All stations x3, this is [controlling station] x3, date and time in UTC, distressed vessel's MMSI number, distressed vessel's name, distressed vessel's call sign, SEELONCE FEENEE.

== See also ==
- Aircraft emergency frequency
- CQD
- Global Maritime Distress Safety System
- Sécurité
- Vessel emergency codes
