= Longwave =

Radio transmission using wavelengths above 1000 m

Tuning dial on 1946 Dynatron Merlin T.69 console radio receiver, showing LW wavelengths between 800 and 2000 metres (375–150 kHz)

In radio, longwave (also spelled long wave or long-wave and commonly abbreviated LW) is the part of the radio spectrum with wavelengths longer than what was originally called the medium-wave (MW) broadcasting band. The term is historic, dating from the early 20th century, when the radio spectrum was considered to consist of LW, MW, and short-wave (SW) radio bands. Most modern radio systems and devices use wavelengths which would then have been considered 'ultra-short' (i.e. VHF, UHF, and microwave).

In contemporary usage, the term longwave is not defined precisely, and its intended meaning varies. It may be used for radio wavelengths longer than 1,000 m i.e. frequencies (Note: Wave length and frequency are inversely related, with lower frequencies corresponding to longer wavelengths; 300 kHz corresponds to 1,000 m.) lower than 300 kilohertz (kHz), including the International Telecommunication Union (ITU) low frequency (LF, 30–300 kHz) and very low frequency (VLF, 3–30 kHz) bands. Sometimes the upper limit is taken to be higher than 300 kHz, but not above the start of the medium wave broadcast band at 520 kHz.

In Europe, Africa, and large parts of Asia (International Telecommunication Union Region 1), where a range of frequencies between 148.5 and 283.5 kHz is used for AM broadcasting in addition to the MW band, the term longwave usually refers specifically to this broadcasting band, which falls wholly within the LF band of the radio spectrum (30–300 kHz). The "Longwave Club of America" (United States) is interested in "frequencies below the AM broadcast band" (i.e., all frequencies below 520 kHz).

== Propagation ==
Because of their long wavelength, radio waves in this frequency range can diffract over obstacles like mountain ranges and travel beyond the horizon, following the contour of the Earth. This mode of propagation, called ground wave, is the main mode in the longwave band. The attenuation of signal strength with distance by absorption in the ground is lower than at higher frequencies, and falls with frequency. Low frequency ground waves can be received up to 2,000 kilometres (1,200 mi) from the transmitting antenna. Very low frequency waves below 30 kHz can be used to communicate at transcontinental distances, can penetrate saltwater to depths of hundreds of feet, and are used by the military to communicate with submerged submarines.

Low frequency waves can also occasionally travel long distances by reflecting from the ionosphere (the actual mechanism is one of refraction), although this method, called skywave or "skip" propagation, is not as common as at higher frequencies. Reflection occurs at the ionospheric E layer or F layers. Skywave signals can be detected at distances exceeding 3,000 kilometres (1,900 mi) from the transmitting antenna.

== Non-broadcast use ==
=== Non-directional beacons ===
Non-directional beacons transmit continuously for the benefit of radio direction finders in marine and aeronautical navigation. They identify themselves by a callsign in Morse code. They can occupy any frequency in the range 190–1750 kHz. In North America, they occupy 190–535 kHz. In ITU Region 1 the lower limit is 280 kHz.

=== Time signals ===
There are institutional broadcast stations in the range that transmit coded time signals to radio clocks. For example:

- WWVB in Colorado, United States, on 60 kHz, 70 kW ERP
- DCF77 in Frankfurt, Germany, on 77.5 kHz, 50 kW
- JJY in Japan, on 40 & 60 kHz, 50 kW
- RBU 66.66 kHz in Taldom transmitter, Russia, 10 kW
- BPC in Shangqiu, China, 68.5 kHz, 90 kW
- MSF time and 60 kHz frequency standard transmitted from Anthorn in the UK, 17 kW ERP.
- ALS162 from Allouis, France, on 162 kHz, 800 kW

Radio-controlled clocks receive their time calibration signals with built-in long-wave receivers. They use long-wave, rather than short-wave or medium-wave, because long-wave signals from the transmitter to the receiver always travel along the same direct path across the surface of the Earth, so the time delay correction for the signal travel time from the transmitting station to the receiver is always the same for any one receiving location.

Longwaves travel by groundwaves that hug the surface of the Earth, unlike mediumwaves and shortwaves. Those higher-frequency signals do not follow the surface of the Earth beyond a few kilometers, but can travel as skywaves, 'bouncing' off different layers of the ionosphere at different times of day. These different propagation paths can make the time lag different for every signal received. The delay between when the long-wave signal was sent from the transmitter (when the coded time was correct) and when the signal is received by the clock (when the coded time is slightly late) depends on the overland distance between the clock and the transmitter and the speed of light through the air, which is also very nearly constant. Since the time lag is essentially the same, a single constant shift forward from the time coded in the signal can compensate for all long-wave signals received at any one location from the same time signal station.

=== Submarine communication ===
The militaries of the United Kingdom, Russian Federation, United States, Germany, India and Sweden use frequencies below 50 kHz to communicate with submerged submarines.

=== Amateur radio ===
In the ITU Radio Regulations the band 135.7–137.8 kHz is allocated (on a secondary basis) to amateur radio worldwide, subject to a power limit of 1 watt EIRP. Many countries' regulators license amateurs to use it.

=== LowFER ===
In North America during the 1970s, the frequencies 167, 179, and 191 kHz were assigned to the short-lived Public Emergency Radio of the United States.

Nowadays, in the United States, Part 15 of FCC regulations allow unlicensed use of the 160–190 kHz band a transmitter / amplifier output power to the antenna of at most 1 watt, with an antenna at most 15 meters (49 feet) high; this is called Low Frequency Experimental Radio (LowFER).

The 190–435 kHz band is used for navigational beacons.

Frequencies from 472–479 kHz are available to licensed amateurs as the new 630 m band, part of the now-defunct maritime band, but this is often considered a medium wave sub-band.

=== Historic ===
Swedish station SAQ, located at the Varberg Radio Station facility in Grimeton, is the last remaining operational Alexanderson alternator long-wave transmitter. Although the station ended regular service in 1996, it has been maintained as a World Heritage Site, and makes at least two demonstration transmissions yearly, on 17.2 kHz.

== Broadcasting ==
Longwave is used for broadcasting only within ITU Region 1. The long-wave broadcasters are located in Europe, North Africa, and Mongolia.

Typically, a larger geographic area can be covered by a long-wave broadcast transmitter compared to a medium-wave one. This is because ground-wave propagation suffers less attenuation due to ground conductivity at lower frequencies.

Many countries have stopped using LW for broadcasting because of low audience figures, a lack of LW on new consumer receivers, increasing interference levels, the energy inefficiency of amplitude modulation and high electricity costs at transmitters. Between 2014 and 2015 Russia closed all of its LW broadcast transmitters. In the UK, the BBC exited the waveband in June 2026. BBC Radio 4 ceased broadcasting on channel 198 kHz at 0000 GMT, 27 June 2026, with the Shipping Forecast, a brief sign off, and a rendition of "God Save the King". The radio teleswitch service for electricity meters was also broadcast with the long wave signal. In October 2024 the Radio Teleswitch Taskforce said that the service would end on 30 June 2025, but this was later postponed.

Retune loop on 198kHz after the closure of BBC Radio 4 LW, 27 June 2026

As of September 2026, the only remaining longwave stations in the world are in Romania, Poland, Algeria, and Mongolia.

=== Carrier frequencies ===
With the adoption of the Geneva Frequency Plan of 1975, long-wave carrier frequencies are exact multiples of 9 kHz; ranging from 153 to 279 kHz. But there were two exceptions. The first one was a French-language station, Europe 1 in Germany, which retained its prior channel 183 kHz, spacing until the longwave service was terminated in 2019. The second exception was again in Germany, but it's a cultural channel, Deutschlandradio Kultur on 177 kHz and remained until the longwave service disappeared in 2014. Other exceptions are all Mongolian transmitters, which are 2 kHz above the internationally recognized channels.

Until the 1970s, some long-wave stations in northern and eastern Europe and the Soviet Union operated on frequencies as high as 433 kHz.

Some radio broadcasters, for instance the former Droitwich transmitting station in the UK, derive their carrier frequencies from an atomic clock, allowing their use as frequency standards. Droitwich also broadcast a low bit-rate data channel, using narrow-shift phase-shift keying of the carrier, for Radio Teleswitch Services.

=== Long-distance reception ===
Because long-wave signals can travel very long distances, some radio amateurs and shortwave listeners engage in an activity called DXing. DXers attempt to listen in to far away transmissions, and they will often send a reception report to the sending station to let them know where they were heard. After receiving a report, the sending station may mail the listener a QSL card to acknowledge this reception.

Reception of long-wave signals at distances in excess of 17,000 kilometres (11,000 mi) have been verified.

=== List of long-wave broadcasting transmitters ===
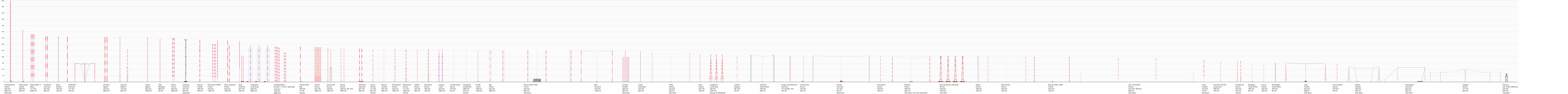
Height diagram of the antenna towers and antenna masts of long-wave broadcasting stations

== See also ==
- Low frequency: for other uses (military, commercial and amateur) of this part of the radio spectrum (30–300 kHz)
- Electromagnetic spectrum: Very low frequency, Shortwave, Ground wave, Skywave, Medium wave
- Radio broadcasting: AM broadcasting, BBC Radio 4, BBC Light Programme, Radio clock, Office de Radiodiffusion-Télévision Française, Warsaw radio mast, Digital Radio Mondiale, International broadcasting,
- Shipping: Global navigation satellite system, Navigation, Shipping Forecast
- Lists: Index of wave articles
- Other: 1 kilometre, National Institute of Standards and Technology, WGU-20
