= World Administrative Radio Conference =

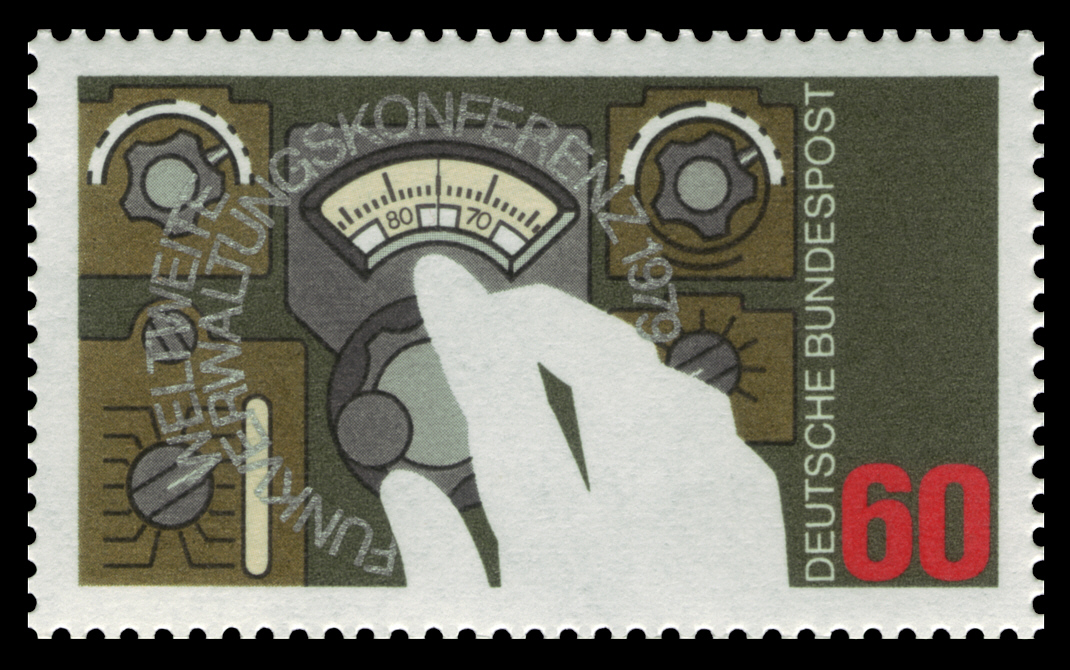
Western German stamp, World Administrative Radio Conference 1979 in Geneva

The World Administrative Radio Conference (WARC) was a technical conference of the International Telecommunication Union (ITU) where delegates from member nations of the ITU met to revise or amend the entire international radio regulations pertaining to all telecommunication services throughout the world.

The path toward international regulation of radio began after the Deutschland incident of 1902, when US-coast based stations with Marconi radios refused to communicate with ships that used other equipment. To solve the matter, the German Empire invited delegates from ten countries to Berlin for a Preliminary Conference on Wireless Telegraphy in 1903.

The first WARC conference was held in Geneva in Switzerland in 1979, while preparatory conferences were held in Panama City, Panama.

One outcome of the 1979 meeting was the allocation of three new amateur radio bands.

In 1992, at an Additional Plenipotentiary Conference in Geneva, the ITU was restructured and as a result from 1993 the conference became known as the World Radiocommunication Conference or WRC.

== Conferences list ==
- ITU Preparatory to World Administrative Radio Conference Panama 1979
- ITU World Administrative Radio Conference Geneva 1979 (WARC-79)
- ITU World Administrative Radio Conference Geneva 1984 (Note: Complete name: World Administrative Radio Conference for the Planning of the HF Bands Allocated to the Broadcasting Service (1st session) (WARC HFBC-84))
- ITU World Administrative Radio Conference Geneva 1992 (WARC-92) (Note: Complete name: World Administrative Radio Conference for Dealing with Frequency Allocations in Certain Parts of the Spectrum)

== See also ==
- Amateur radio
- Radio
- Telecommunications
