= Deutschland incident =

The Deutschland incident can refer to:

- Deutschland incident (1902), involving the SS Deutschland, and leading to a monopoly dispute
- Deutschland incident (1937), involving the German warship Deutschland, during the Spanish Civil War
