= Maritime broadcast communications net =

Telecommunications network

In telecommunications, a maritime broadcast communications net is a communications net that is used for international distress calling, including international lifeboat, lifecraft, and survival-craft high frequency (HF); aeronautical emergency very high frequency (VHF); survival ultra high frequency (UHF); international calling and safety very high frequency (VHF); combined scene-of-search-and-rescue; and other similar and related purposes.

Note: Basic international distress calling is performed at either medium frequency (MF) or at high frequency (HF).

== See also ==
- 500 kHz
- Distress frequency
- Global Maritime Distress Safety System

This article incorporates public domain material from Federal Standard 1037C. General Services Administration. Archived from the original on 2022-01-22.
