= 500 kHz =

Maritime radio frequency

From early in the 20th century, the radio frequency of 500 kilohertz (500 kHz) was an international calling and distress frequency for Morse code maritime communication. For much of its early history, this frequency was referred to by its equivalent wavelength, 600 meters, or, using the earlier frequency unit name, 500 kilocycles (per second) or 500 kc.

Maritime authorities of many nations, including the Maritime and Coastguard Agency and the United States Coast Guard, once maintained 24 hour watches on this frequency, staffed by skilled radio operators. Many SOS calls and medical emergencies at sea were handled via this frequency. However, as the use of Morse code over radio is uncommon in commercial shipping, 500 kHz is no longer used as a Morse code distress frequency. Beginning in the late 1990s, most nations ended official monitoring of transmissions on 500 kHz and most emergency traffic on 500 kHz has been replaced by the Global Maritime Distress Safety System (GMDSS).

== Current status ==
The 500 kHz frequency has now been allocated to the maritime Navigational Data or NAVDAT broadcast system.

The nearby frequencies of 518 kHz and 490 kHz are used for the NAVTEX component of GMDSS. Proposals to allocate frequencies at or near 500 kHz to amateur radio use resulted in the international allocation of 472–479 kHz to the 630-meter amateur radio band, now implemented in many countries.

== Initial adoption ==
International standards for the use of 500 kHz first appeared in the first International Radiotelegraph Convention in Berlin, which was signed 3 November 1906, and became effective 1 July 1908.

The second service regulation affixed to this Convention designated 500 kHz as one of the standard frequencies to be employed by shore stations, specifying that

"Two wave lengths, one of 300 meters [1 MHz] and the other of 600 meters, are authorized for general public service. Every coastal station opened to such service shall use one or the other of these two wave lengths."

These regulations also specified that ship stations normally used 1 MHz.

== Expanded policies ==
International standards for the use of 500 kHz were expanded by the second International Radiotelegraph Convention, which was held in London after the sinking of the RMS Titanic. This meeting produced an agreement which was signed on 5 July 1912, and became effective 1 July 1913.

The Service Regulations, affixed to the 1912 convention, established 500 kHz as the primary frequency for seagoing communication, and the standard ship frequency was changed from 1,000 kHz to 500 kHz, to match the coastal station standard. Communication was generally conducted in Morse code, initially using spark-gap transmitters. Most two-way radio contacts were to be initiated on this frequency, although once established, the participating stations could shift to another frequency to avoid the congestion on 500 kHz. To facilitate communication between operators speaking different languages, standardized abbreviations were used, including a set of "Q codes" specified by the 1912 Service Regulations.

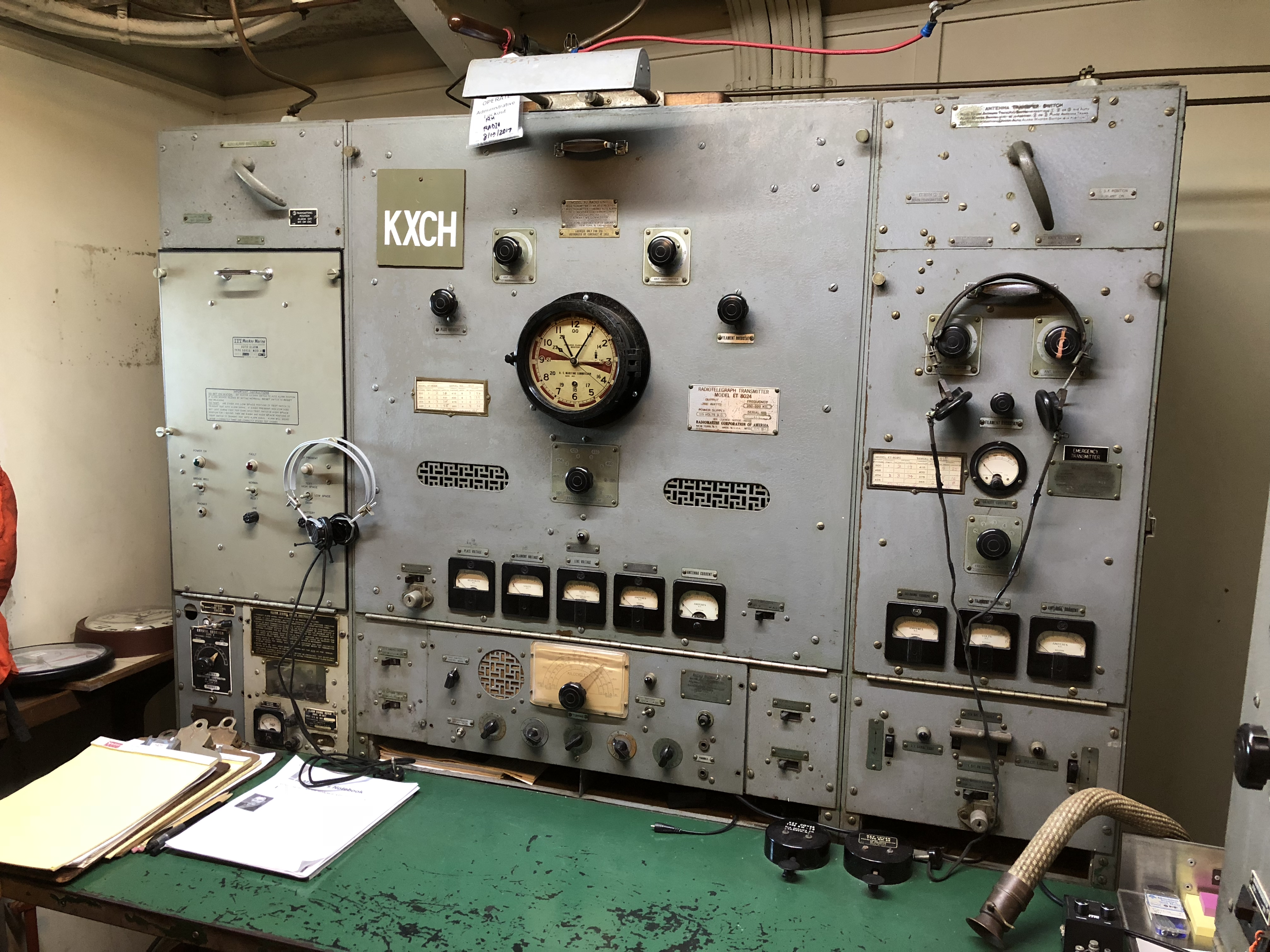
500 kHz transmitter and receiver position on SS Jeremiah O'Brien, a World War II Liberty ship

Article XXI of the Service Regulations required that whenever an S̅O̅S̅ distress call was heard, all transmissions unrelated to the emergency had to immediately cease until the emergency was declared over.

There was a potential problem if a ship transmitted a distress call: The use of 500 kHz as a common frequency often led to heavy congestion, especially around major ports and shipping lanes, and it was possible the distress message would be drowned out by the bedlam of ongoing commercial traffic. To help address this problem, the Service Regulation's Article XXXII specified that

Coastal stations engaged in the transmission of long radiograms shall suspend the transmission at the end of each period of 15 minutes, and remain silent for a period of three minutes before resuming the transmission. Coastal and shipboard stations working under the conditions specified in Article XXXV, par. 2, shall suspend work at the end of each period of 15 minutes and listen in with a wave length of 600 meters during a period of 3 minutes before resuming the transmission.

During distress working all non-distress traffic was banned from 500 kHz and adjacent coast stations then monitored 512 kHz as an additional calling frequency for ordinary traffic.

== Later policies ==
The silent and monitoring periods were soon expanded and standardized. For example, Regulation 44, from the 27 July 1914, edition of Radio Communication Laws of the United States, stated: "The international standard wave length is 600 meters, and the operators of all coast stations are required, during the hours the station is in operation, to 'listen in' at intervals of not more than 15 minutes and for a period not less than 2 minutes, with the receiving apparatus tuned to receive this wave length, for the purpose of determining if any distress signals or messages are being sent and to determine if the transmitting operations of the 'listening station' are causing interference with other radio communication."

International refinements for the use of 500 kHz were specified in later agreements, including the 1932 Madrid Radio Conference. In later years, except for distress traffic, stations shifted to nearby "working frequencies" to exchange messages once contact was established: 425, 454, 468, 480, and 512 kHz were used by ships while the coast stations had their own individual working frequencies.

Twice each hour, all stations operating on 500 kHz were required to maintain a strictly enforced three-minute silent period, starting at 15 and 45 minutes past the hour.

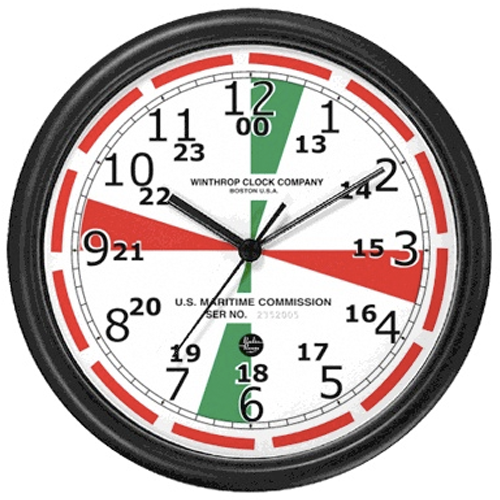
Ship's radio room clock with silence periods marked

As a visual memory aid, a typical clock in a ship's radio room would have the silence periods marked by shading the sectors between h+15ᵐ to h+18ᵐ and h+45ᵐ to h+48ᵐ in RED. Similar sectors between h+00ᵐ to h+03ᵐ and h+30ᵐ to h+33ᵐ are marked in GREEN which is the corresponding silence period for the 2182 kHz voice communications distress signals.

In addition, during this silent period all coastal and ship stations were required to monitor the frequency, listening for any distress signals. All large ships at sea had to monitor 500 kHz at all times, either with a licensed radio operator or with equipment (called an auto-alarm) that detected an automatically sent distress signal consisting of long dashes.

Simulated auto-alarm signal.

Shore stations throughout the world operated on this frequency to exchange messages with ships and to issue warning about weather and other navigational warnings.

At night, transmission ranges of 3,000–4,000 miles (4,500–6,500 kilometers) were typical. Daytime ranges were much shorter, on the order of 300–1,500 miles (500–2,500 kilometers). Terman's Radio Engineering Handbook (1948) shows the maximum distance for 1 kW over salt water to be 1,500 miles, and this distance was routinely covered by ships at sea, where signals from ships and nearby coastal stations would cause congestion, covering up distant and weaker signals. During the silence, a distress signal could more easily be heard at great distances.

== NAVDAT ==
Following the adoption of GMDSS in 1999 and the subsequent obsolescence of 500 kHz as a Morse distress frequency, the 2019 World Radiocommunication Conference (WRC-19) allocated 500 ± 5 kHz to the maritime NAVDAT service.

NAVDAT is intended for the broadcast of data from shore-to-ship and may thus be compared to NAVTEX. However, NAVDAT uses QAM modulation (in comparison to the SITOR used by NAVTEX) and is therefore capable of much higher data throughput. This allows NAVDAT broadcasts to carry images and other data as well as plain text, further allowing this data to be presented directly on an Electronic Chart Display and Information System (ECDIS). This presents a significant improvement over the text-only NAVTEX system.

As of February 2023, no maritime authorities have begun NAVDAT broadcasts.

== Amateur radio ==
Maritime traffic currently displaced from the 500 kHz band in most countries, and with the ITU 472–479 kHz amateur allocation, most countries no longer using it have allocated frequencies near 500 kHz to amateur radio use on a secondary basis, although the primary allocation of the band remains with the maritime mobile service.

Full details of these allocations can be found under the article on the 630 metre amateur radio band.

== See also ==
- 2182 kHz – the international distress frequency for voice maritime communication
- 630-meter band
- Navtex – a maritime weather and safety text broadcast on 518 kHz and 490 kHz
- Aircraft emergency frequency
- Call for help – for emergency frequencies in current use
- Distress signal
- GMDSS
- Mayday
- Medium frequency radio propagation
- Radio Act of 1912
- Radio propagation
- SOS
