= 630-meter band =

Amateur radio frequency band

The 630-meter (or 600-meter) amateur radio band is a frequency band allocated by the International Telecommunication Union (ITU) to amateur radio operators, and it ranges from 472–479 kHz, or equivalently 625.9–635.1 meters wavelength. It was formally allocated to amateurs at the 2012 World Radiocommunication Conference (WRC-12). The band is available on a secondary basis in all ITU regions with the limitation that amateur stations have maximum radiated power of 1 watt effective isotropic radiated power (EIRP); however, stations more than 800 km (500 miles) from certain countries (Note: The maximum equivalent isotropically radiated power (EIRP) of stations in the Amateur Service using frequencies in the band 472–479 kHz shall not exceed 1 W. Administrations may increase this limit of EIRP to 5 W in portions of their territory which are at a distance of more than 800 km (500 miles) from the borders of Algeria, Saudi Arabia, Azerbaijan, Bahrain, Belarus, China, Comoros, Djibouti, Egypt, United Arab Emirates, the Russian Federation, Iran, Iraq, Jordan, Kazakhstan, Kuwait, Lebanon, Libya, Morocco, Mauritania, Oman, Uzbekistan, Qatar, Syrian Arab Republic, Kyrgyzstan, Somalia, Sudan, Tunisia, Ukraine and Yemen. In this frequency band, stations in the amateur service shall not cause harmful interference to, or claim protection from, stations of the aeronautical radionavigation service.) may be permitted to use 5 watts EIRP.

The new WRC-12 allocation did not take formal effect until 1 January 2013. However, several countries had already allocated the WRC-12 band to amateurs domestically. Previously, several other countries authorized temporary allocations or experimental operations on nearby frequencies.

The band is in the medium frequency (MF) region, within the 415–526.5 kHz maritime band.

== History ==
With maritime traffic largely displaced from the 500 kHz band, some countries had taken steps prior to 2012 to allocate frequencies at or near 500 kHz to amateur radio use.

During the 2012 World Radiocommunication Conference (WRC-12) of the International Telecommunication Union, a 15 kHz allocation to the amateur radio service was considered on a secondary use basis. The frequencies studied were between 415 kHz and 526.5 kHz. The result was that 472–479 kHz was identified as agreeable for all three ITU Regions, except for some countries such as Russia, China, and some Arab states.

WRC-12 re-allocated the original 500 kHz frequency back to exclusive maritime mobile use for new navigation systems. On 14 February 2012, the delegates at WRC-12 formally approved allocating 472–479 kHz to the amateur radio service; however, this new allocation will not take effect until it is entered into the ITU's Radio Regulations. Following that, individual regulatory authorities need to implement the change nationally in order to make the allocation available to radio amateurs under their jurisdiction.

Recently amateurs have experimented with weak-signal radio communication near 474.2 kHz, utilising WSPR.

== Countries in which operation is permitted ==
Regions with an amateur radio allocation near 500 kHz in early 2011. Dark blue indicates official allocations based on WRC-12. Light blue indicates official allocations that are outside the WRC-12 frequencies (e.g. Norway). Green indicates experimental allocations. Operation is prohibited in red regions.

=== Countries with a known band allocation ===
In Argentina, amateurs have an allocation of 472–479 kHz.

In Australia amateurs now have an allocation from 472–479 kHz, known as the 630-metre band. The maximum EIRP is 5 watts.

In Belgium, on 14 August 2013, a new allocation of 472–479 kHz has been added to the existing allocation of 501–504 kHz for ham radio operators holding a HAREC-class license. The maximum EIRP is 5 watts. All modes are permitted.

In Brazil, amateurs received privileges as secondary users on 472–479 kHz in August 2018.

In Canada, amateurs have a secondary allocation from 472–479 kHz beginning 1 April 2014 where they may not exceed 5 W, or 1 W EIRP in some locations.

In France (including the French Overseas Departments and Territories) amateurs have access to 472–479 kHz, with 1 watt EIRP.

Germany allocated the frequencies to amateur radio based on the WRC-12 conference, effective 13 June 2012.

In New Zealand, the band 472–479 kHz was allocated to amateur radio, on a secondary basis, with an effective date of 20 December 2012. Amateur transmissions are limited to 25 watts EIRP.

In Norway, including Svalbard, Jan Mayen, and the Bouvet Island, amateurs have an allocation of 472–479 kHz on a secondary basis. Maximum output power is 100 watts, and maximum EIRP of 1 watt.

The Philippines allocated 472–479 kHz to amateur radio, with an effective date of 30 August 2012.

In Poland, amateurs have an allocation from 472–479 kHz since 18 February 2014. The maximum EIRP is 1 watt.

The Principality of Monaco allocated 472–479 kHz to the amateur service on 18 May 2012.

In the United Kingdom, the band is available to Full Licensees only. Usage by Foundation and Intermediate licensees is not permitted.

In the United States, the Federal Communications Commission approved allocating 472–479 kHz on a secondary basis to the amateur service, in a report and order released on 29 March 2017. Amateurs wishing to operate on the band will need to notify the Utilities Technology Council (UTC) and be separated at least 1 km (1,000 yards) from electric transmission lines that carry power-line communication (PLC) signals that use the same band. The maximum EIRP is 5 watts with the transmitter output power not exceeding 500 watts PEP. CW, RTTY, data, phone, and image emissions are allowed. The first US amateur stations activated the band on Friday 13 October 2017.

In the Netherlands, amateurs have an allocation from 472–479 kHz. Restriction in this is that no contests are allowed, and only the modes A1A, F1A, G1A, and J2A are allowed. The allocation is secondary, and a maximum power rating of 100 watts PEP is allowed.

As of December 2012, amateurs in some other countries continue to operate on their pre-WRC-12 permits on other frequencies.

=== Allocations before WRC-12 ===
In Belgium, amateurs were allocated 501–504 kHz on a secondary basis on 15 January 2008. Only CW may be used with a maximum ERP of 5 W. On 14 August 2013, an additional allocation for 472–479 kHz has been added allowing all modes of transmission.

In Norway, the band 493–510 kHz was allocated to radio amateurs on 6 November 2009. Only radiotelegraphy is permitted. After WRC-12, this allocation was replaced with an allocation of 472–479 kHz.

In the Netherlands 501–505 kHz was allocated to Amateur Radio operators, with a maximum of 100 watts PEP, on 1 January 2012. (Note: "... tot wijziging van de Regeling gebruik van frequentieruimte zonder vergunning 2008 in verband met de implementatie van twee besluiten van de Commissie van de Europese Gemeenschappen en het vergunningvrij maken van het gebruik van grond- en muur penetrerende radar ..." [... amending the Regulation on the use of frequency space without a license 2008 in connection with the implementation of two decisions of the Commission of the European Communities and making the use of ground-penetrating and wall-penetrating radar license-free ...])

In New Zealand, the 505–515 kHz band was allocated to amateur radio temporarily, "pending an international frequency allocation", on 1 March 2010. Amateur use is on a non-interference basis, and transmissions are limited to 25 watts EIRP, with a bandwidth not exceeding 200 Hz. Now that an international frequency allocation has been made by the ITU and subsequently implemented in New Zealand, this temporary band is being phased out. A transition period of one year was given for amateurs to move to the new allocation. Use of this band will not be permitted after 31 December 2013.

=== Countries with past or current experimental operation ===
Other regions have granted experimental uses for selected licensees in advance of any international frequency allocation.

The U.S. Federal Communications Commission (FCC) granted the American Radio Relay League an experimental license to explore such uses in September 2006. Eleven years later, the US FCC granted access to all amateurs with a general (or higher) license, effective 13 October 2017.

Subsequently, the UK started to issue Special Research Permits for amateurs to use 501–504 kHz.

Ireland has allowed individuals to apply for Test Licenses in the 501–504 kHz frequency range.

Canada has allowed individuals to apply for use in the 504–509 kHz frequency range.

Other regions with experimental operations include Croatia, Czech Republic, Denmark, Iceland, Sweden, Spain, and Slovenia.

== Countries in which operation is prohibited ==
As part of the compromise to allocate the band, a new footnote (Note: The use of the frequency band 472–479 kHz in Algeria, Saudi Arabia, Azerbaijan, Bahrain, Belarus, China, Comoros, Djibouti, Egypt, United Arab Emirates, the Russian Federation, Iraq, Jordan, Kazakhstan, Kuwait, Lebanon, Libya, Mauritania, Oman, Uzbekistan, Qatar, Syrian Arab Republic, Kyrgyzstan, Somalia, Sudan, Tunisia and Yemen is limited to the maritime mobile and aeronautical radio-navigation services. The Amateur Service shall not be used in the above-mentioned countries in this frequency band, and this should be taken into account by the countries authorizing such use.) was added to the ITU's Table of Frequency Allocations, which prohibits amateur operation between 472–479 kHz in many countries:

- Algeria
- Azerbaijan
- Bahrain
- Belarus
- China
- Comoros
- Djibouti
- Egypt
- Iraq
- Jordan
- Kazakhstan
- Kuwait
- Kyrgyzstan
- Lebanon
- Libya
- Mauritania
- Oman
- Qatar
- Russia
- Saudi Arabia
- Somalia
- Sudan
- Syria
- Tunisia
- United Arab Emirates
- Uzbekistan
- Yemen

== See also ==
- Maritime band, or 500 kHz
- Maritime mobile amateur radio
- Medium frequency radio propagation
- Radio propagation
- LowFER

== Footnotes ==
Range	Band	ITU Region 1	ITU Region 2	ITU Region 3
LF	2200 m	135.7–137.8 kHz		
MF	630 m	472–479 kHz		
MF	160 m	1.810–1.850 MHz	1.800–2.000 MHz	
HF	80 / 75 m	3.500–3.800 MHz	3.500–4.000 MHz	3.500–3.900 MHz
HF	60 m	5.3515–5.3665 MHz		
HF	40 m	7.000–7.200 MHz	7.000–7.300 MHz	7.000–7.200 MHz
HF	30 m^{[t2]}	10.100–10.150 MHz		
HF	20 m	14.000–14.350 MHz		
HF	17 m^{[t2]}	18.068–18.168 MHz		
HF	15 m	21.000–21.450 MHz		
HF	12 m^{[t2]}	24.890–24.990 MHz		
HF	10 m	28.000–29.700 MHz		
VHF	8 m^{[t3]}	40.000–40.700 MHz	—N/a	
VHF	6 m	50.000–52.000 MHz (50.000–54.000 MHz)^{[t4]}	50.000–54.000 MHz	
VHF	5 m^{[t3]}	58.000–60.100 MHz	—N/a	
VHF	4 m^{[t3]}	70.000–70.500 MHz	—N/a	
VHF	2 m	144.000–146.000 MHz	144.000–148.000 MHz	
VHF	1.25 m	—N/a	220.000–225.000 MHz	—N/a
UHF	70 cm	430.000–440.000 MHz	430.000–440.000 MHz (420.000–450.000 MHz)^{[t4]}	
UHF	33 cm	—N/a	902.000–928.000 MHz	—N/a
UHF	23 cm	1.240–1.300 GHz		
UHF	13 cm	2.300–2.450 GHz		
SHF	9 cm	3.400–3.475 GHz^{[t4]}	3.300–3.500 GHz	
SHF	5 cm	5.650–5.850 GHz	5.650–5.925 GHz	5.650–5.850 GHz
SHF	3 cm	10.000–10.500 GHz		
SHF	1.2 cm	24.000–24.250 GHz		
EHF	6 mm	47.000–47.200 GHz		
EHF	4 mm^{[t4]}	75.500 GHz^{[t3]} – 81.500 GHz	76.000–81.500 GHz	
EHF	2.5 mm	122.250–123.000 GHz		
EHF	2 mm	134.000–141.000 GHz		
EHF	1 mm	241.000–250.000 GHz		
THF	Sub-mm	Some administrations have authorized spectrum for amateur use in this region; others have declined to regulate frequencies above 300 GHz.		
[t1]	All allocations are subject to variation by country. For simplicity, only common allocations found internationally are listed. See a band's article for specifics.			
[t2]	HF allocation created at the 1979 World Administrative Radio Conference. These are commonly called the "WARC bands".			
[t3]	This is not mentioned in the ITU's Table of Frequency Allocations, but many individual administrations have commonly adopted this allocation under "Article 4.4".			
[t4]	This includes a currently active footnote allocation mentioned in the ITU's Table of Frequency Allocations. These allocations may only apply to a group of countries.			
See also: Radio spectrum, Electromagnetic spectrum
