= Preliminary Conference on Wireless Telegraphy =

1903 conference held in Berlin, Germany

The Preliminary Conference on Wireless Telegraphy, held in Berlin, Germany, in August 1903, reviewed radio communication (then known as "wireless telegraphy") issues, in preparation for the first International Radiotelegraph Convention held three years later. This was the first multinational gathering for discussing the development of worldwide radio standards.

== Background ==
The immediate cause for the conference was the previous year's Deutschland incident. Early that year one of the passengers aboard the SS Deutschland, Prince Heinrich of Prussia, brother of the German Kaiser, attempted to send a wireless telegram thanking U.S. president Theodore Roosevelt for his recent hospitality. The ship was equipped with Slaby-d'Arco radio equipment, and was unsuccessful in getting the telegram message accepted by a coastal station located off the coast of Nantucket, Massachusetts, that used Marconi Company equipment and was staffed by Marconi employees. This was due to the Marconi company's policy of ignoring transmissions from all non-Marconi equipped vessels, except in the case of emergencies. In response, the German government sent out diplomatic notes asking selected countries to participate in a conference addressing the issue of international radio communication.

== Conference actions ==
The resulting conference convened in August 1903 in Berlin, and was attended by representatives from nine countries: Germany, Austria, Spain, the United States of America, France, Hungary, Russia, Great Britain and Italy. At its close on August 13, 1903, the conference adopted a Final Protocol consisting of eight articles that the participants agreed to propose for adoption by their respective governments.

In addition to basic operational questions, the major issue addressed by the participants was a requirement for unlimited access to shore stations even when the communicating stations were operated by different companies. This was addressed by section 2 of the Final Protocol's Article I, which stated: "Coastwise stations are required to receive and transmit telegrams originating on ships at sea without distinction as to the systems of wireless telegraphy employed by said ships." An underlying concern, especially on the part of Germany, was that a Marconi monopoly would also result in domination by its home country, Great Britain, in international radio communication, much as that country already dominated international undersea telegraph cables. However, Marconi officials strongly objected to this interconnection requirement, on the grounds that competing systems were all infringing on Marconi patents, and this also would allow "freeloading" on the extensive network of Marconi coast stations which had been constructed at great expense. Because they primarily used Marconi equipment, both Great Britain and Italy made qualifying declarations that they did not fully support this interconnection proposal.

It was planned that a follow-up full convention would be held in Berlin the next year to expand on the issues discussed by the original conference. However, this first International Radiotelegraph Convention was somewhat delayed, and convened in 1906.
