= LowFER =

LowFER (Low-Frequency Experimental Radio) refers to experimental radio communication practiced by hobbyists on frequencies below 300 kHz, a part of the radio spectrum known as low frequency. The practitioners are known as "LowFERs".

== Practices ==
LowFER operation is practiced in the United States and Canada on radio frequencies between 160 kHz and 190 kHz which is sometimes referred to as the 1750-meter band, and in the past as the 1875-meter band. In much of the world, including the U.S., there is an adjacent amateur radio band at 136–138 kHz with a number of U.S. amateur radio operators authorized to transmit on that band (notification and lack of objection from power utilities is required). Radio operators who conduct low-frequency experimental operations on the LowFER band are known as LowFERs (pronounced "loafers"). Many LowFERs are also licensed radio amateurs, although an amateur radio license is not required for LowFER communications in those countries in Region 2, as long as the power is below a nationally prescribed limit, often 1 W.

== Equipment ==
Practical antennas at these frequencies are much shorter than the wavelength, making it difficult to efficiently radiate much useful power. By current U.S. and Canadian regulations, LowFER transmitters may not have antenna and feed line lengths longer than 15 metres (49 ft), or final RF stage input powers that exceed 1 watt. Telegraphy and digital modes are the most commonly used for communications, but speech transmission via amplitude modulation (AM) or single-sideband modulation (SSB) is also allowed. Even with such short antennas and low transmit power, LowFER stations have been heard at distances approaching 1,000 miles by listeners using sophisticated receiving setups.

== Similar activities ==
=== LF amateur radio allocation ===
In Europe, and generally in ITU Region 1, the LowFER frequency range (160–190 kHz) is used for broadcasting and is unavailable for two-way communications use. In the United Kingdom there was an allocation for radio amateurs at 73 kHz between 1998 and 2002. The International Telecommunication Union's 2007 World Radiocommunication Conference (WRC-07) in Geneva agreed a secondary allocation 135.7–137.8 kHz (the 2200-meter band) to the Amateur Service on 9 November 2007, marking the first time since amateur allocations began that there has been an amateur band below the medium wave broadcast band. Transmitter power is limited to one watt ERP (meaning an inefficient antenna can be fed a higher power).

=== MedFER ===
In the U.S., license-free operation is also allowed on the medium frequency band, also known as the AM broadcast band. Similar to LowFER, MedFER is medium-frequency experimental radio. MedFER enthusiasts operate under FCC Part 15 rules using 0.1 W (a tenth of a watt) and a three-meter-long antenna between 510 kHz and 1705 kHz, coinciding with the U.S. AM radio band.

=== HiFER ===
HiFER is high-frequency experimental radio operating within a 14 kHz-wide band centered at 13.56 MHz. This frequency range is allocated to industrial, scientific and medical uses as well as low-power communication devices under FCC Part 15 rules, where a small level of radio frequency radiation is allowed without licensing. (See RFID for other uses of this frequency.)

== See also ==
- 630-meter band
