= Medium frequency =

300–3000 kHz range of the electromagnetic spectrum

- Frequency range: 0.3 to 3 MHz
- Wavelength range: 1000 to 100 m

MF's position in the electromagnetic spectrum.

Medium frequency (MF) is the ITU designation for radio frequencies (RF) in the range of 300 kilohertz (kHz) to 3 megahertz (MHz). Part of this band is the medium wave (MW) AM broadcast band. The MF band is also known as the hectometer band as the wavelengths range from ten to one hectometers (1000 to 100 m). Frequencies immediately below MF are denoted as low frequency (LF), while the first band of higher frequencies is known as high frequency (HF). MF is mostly used for AM radio broadcasting, navigational radio beacons, maritime ship-to-shore communication, and transoceanic air traffic control.

== Propagation ==
Radio waves at MF wavelengths propagate via ground waves and reflection from the ionosphere (called skywaves). Ground waves travel just above the earth's surface, following the terrain. At these wavelengths, they can bend (diffract) over hills, and travel beyond the visual horizon, although they may be blocked by mountain ranges. Ground waves are progressively absorbed by the Earth, so the signal strength decreases exponentially with distance from the transmitting antenna. Typical MF radio stations can cover a radius of several hundred kilometres/miles from the transmitter, with longer distances over water and damp earth. MF broadcasting stations use ground waves to cover their listening areas.

MF waves can also travel longer distances via skywave propagation, in which radio waves radiated at an angle into the sky are refracted back to Earth by layers of charged particles (ions) in the ionosphere, the E and F layers. However, at certain times the D layer (at a lower altitude than the refractive E and F layers) can be electronically noisy and absorb MF radio waves, interfering with skywave propagation. This happens when the ionosphere is heavily ionised, such as during the day, in summer and especially at times of high solar activity.

At night, especially in winter months and at times of low solar activity, the ionospheric D layer can virtually disappear. When this happens, MF radio waves can easily be received hundreds or even thousands of miles away as the signal will be refracted by the remaining F layer. This can be very useful for long-distance communication, but can also interfere with local stations. Because of the limited number of available channels in the MW broadcast band, the same frequencies are re-allocated to different broadcasting stations several hundred miles apart. On nights of good skywave propagation, the signals of distant stations may reflect off the ionosphere and interfere with the signals of local stations on the same frequency. The North American Regional Broadcasting Agreement (NARBA) sets aside certain channels for nighttime use over extended service areas via skywave by a few specially licensed AM broadcasting stations. These channels are called clear channels, and the stations, called clear-channel stations, are required to broadcast at higher powers of 10 to 50 kW.

== Uses and applications ==
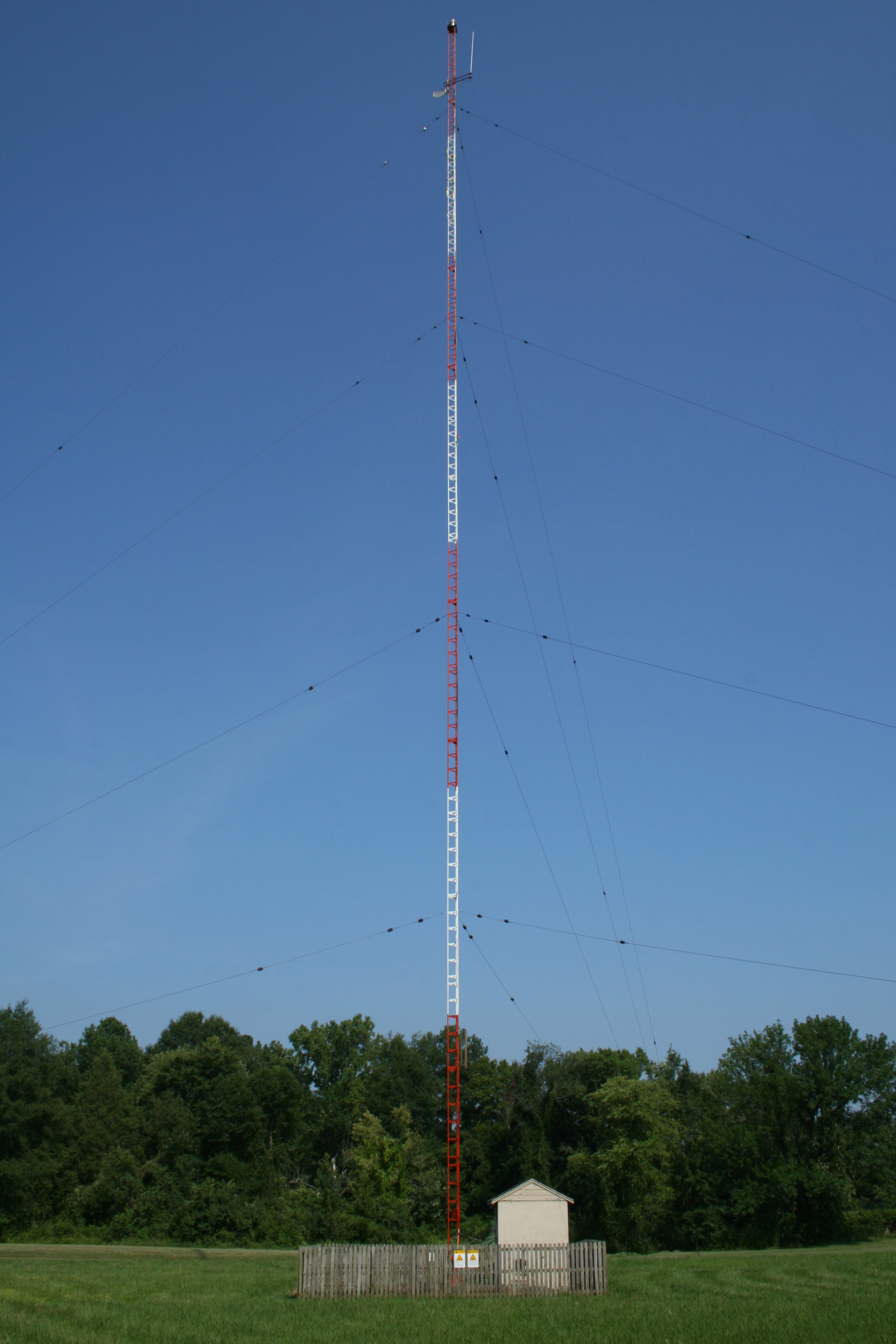
Mast radiator of a commercial MF AM broadcasting station, Chapel Hill, North Carolina, USA

A major use of these frequencies is AM broadcasting; AM radio stations are allocated frequencies in the medium wave broadcast band from 526.5 kHz to 1606.5 kHz in Europe; in North America this extends from 525 kHz to 1705 kHz Some countries also allow broadcasting in the 120-meter band from 2300 to 2495 kHz; these frequencies are mostly used in tropical areas. Although these are medium frequencies, 120 meters is generally treated as one of the shortwave bands.

There are a number of coast guard and other ship-to-shore frequencies in use between 1600 and 2850 kHz. These include, as examples, the French MRCC on 1696 kHz and 2677 kHz, Stornoway Coastguard on 1743 kHz, the US Coastguard on 2670 kHz and Madeira on 2843 kHz. RN Northwood in England broadcasts Weather Fax data on 2618.5 kHz. Non-directional navigational radio beacons (NDBs) for maritime and aircraft navigation occupy a band from 190 to 435 kHz, which overlaps from the LF into the bottom part of the MF band.

2182 kHz is the international calling and distress frequency for SSB maritime voice communication (radiotelephony). It is analogous to Channel 16 on the marine VHF band. 500 kHz was for many years the maritime distress and emergency frequency, and there are more NDBs between 510 and 530 kHz. Navtex, which is part of the current Global Maritime Distress Safety System occupies 518 kHz and 490 kHz for important digital text broadcasts. Lastly, there are aeronautical and other mobile SSB bands from 2850 kHz to 3500 kHz, crossing the boundary from the MF band into the HF radio band.

An amateur radio band known as 160 meters or 'top-band' is between 1800 and 2000 kHz (allocation depends on country and starts at 1810 kHz outside the Americas). Amateur operators transmit CW morse code, digital signals and SSB and AM voice signals on this band. Following World Radiocommunication Conference 2012 (WRC-2012), the amateur service received a new allocation between 472 and 479 kHz for narrow band modes and secondary service, after extensive propagation and compatibility studies made by the ARRL 600 meters Experiment Group and their partners around the world. In recent years, some limited amateur radio operation has also been allowed in the region of 500 kHz in the US, UK, Germany and Sweden.

Many home-portable or cordless telephones, especially those that were designed in the 1980s, transmit low power FM audio signals between the table-top base unit and the handset on frequencies in the range 1600 to 1800 kHz.

== Antennas ==
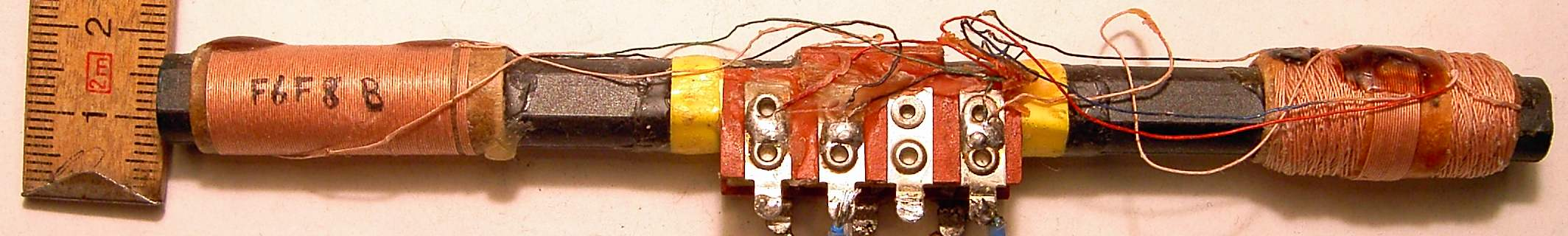
Ferrite loopstick receiving antenna used in AM radios

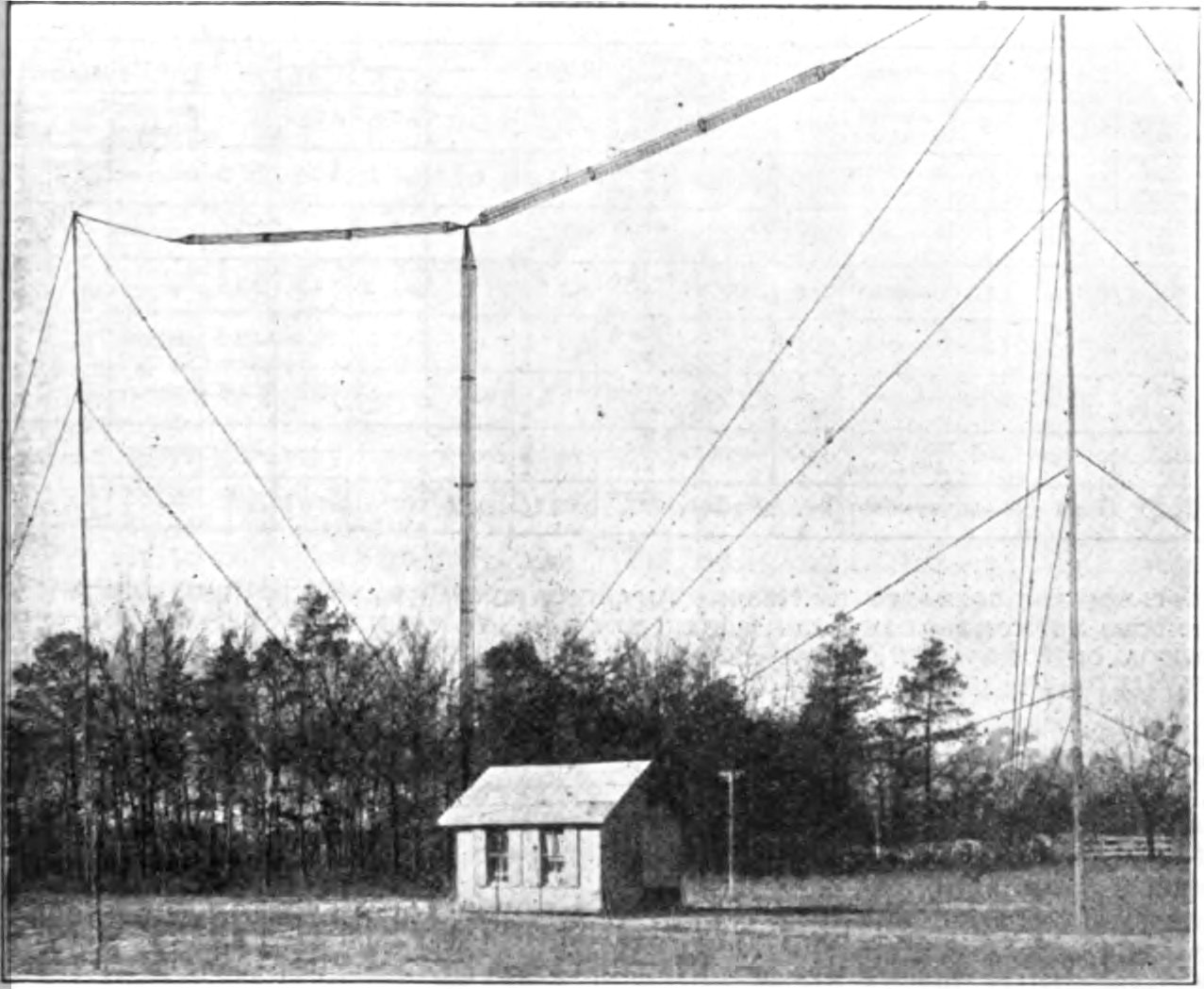
Cage T antenna used by amateur radio transmitter on 1.5 MHz.

Transmitting antennas commonly used on this band include monopole mast radiators, top-loaded wire monopole antennas such as the inverted-L and T antennas, and wire dipole antennas. Ground wave propagation, the most widely used type at these frequencies, requires vertically polarized antennas like monopoles.

The most common transmitting antennas, monopoles of one-quarter to five-eighths wavelength, are physically large at these frequencies, 25 to 250 metres (82 to 820 ft) requiring a tall radio mast. Usually the metal mast itself is energized and used as the antenna, and is mounted on a large porcelain insulator to isolate it from the ground; this is called a mast radiator. The monopole antenna, particularly if electrically short requires a good, low resistance Earth ground connection for efficiency since the ground resistance is in series with the antenna and consumes transmitter power. Commercial radio stations use a ground system consisting of many copper cables, buried shallowly in the earth, radiating from the base of the antenna to a distance of about a quarter wavelength. In areas of rocky or sandy soil where the ground conductivity is poor, above-ground counterpoises are sometimes used.

Lower power transmitters often use electrically short quarter wave monopoles such as inverted-L or T antennas, which are brought into resonance with a loading coil at their base.

Receiving antennas do not have to be as efficient as transmitting antennas since in this band the signal-to-noise ratio is determined by atmospheric noise. The noise floor in the receiver is far below the noise in the signal, so antennas small in comparison to the wavelength, which are inefficient and produce low signal strength, can be used. The weak signal from the antenna can be amplified in the receiver without introducing significant noise. The most common receiving antenna is the ferrite loopstick antenna (also known as a ferrite rod aerial), made from a ferrite rod with a coil of fine wire wound around it. This antenna is small enough that it is usually enclosed inside the radio case. In addition to their use in AM radios, ferrite antennas are also used in portable radio direction finder (RDF) receivers. The ferrite rod antenna has a dipole reception pattern with sharp nulls along the axis of the rod, so that reception is at its best when the rod is at right angles to the transmitter, but fades to nothing when the rod points exactly at the transmitter. Other types of loop antennas and random wire antennas are also used.

== See also ==
- Electromagnetic spectrum
- Global Maritime Distress Safety System
- Maritime broadcast communications net
- Navtex
- Types of radio emissions
