= International Radiotelegraph Convention (1912) =

Update to maritime radio communication standards

The second International Radiotelegraph Convention met in London, England in 1912. It adopted international maritime radio communication standards that updated the ones approved by the first International Radiotelegraph Convention held in Berlin in 1906. The new Convention was signed on July 5, 1912, and became effective on July 1, 1913.

== Convention actions ==
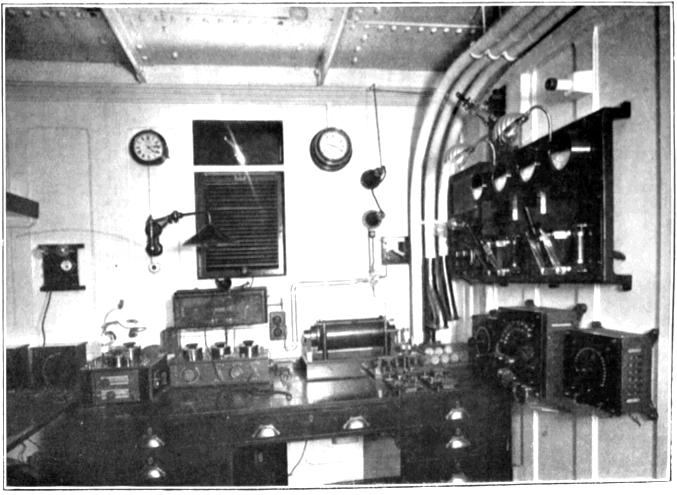
Marconi Company five kilowatt ocean liner wireless telegraph installation (1913). It appears to be RMS Olympic.

The convention was scheduled before the Titanic disaster but met shortly after, and the sinking was an important factor in the deliberations. Thirty-seven delegations attended. Unlike the previous Convention, there were no objections to the idea of compulsory intercommunication, and the Marconi Company announced that it had ended its policy of, outside of emergencies, only permitting its stations to communicate with other Marconi stations.

Significant additional new regulations were added to the international standards adopted at the 1906 Convention, including:

- Maintaining a continuous radio watch by certain ships.
- Specification of compulsory "listening-in" periods for the first ten minutes of each hour, by ships not required to maintain constant watch.
- A requirement that a ship's radio be capable of working for at least six hours without the ship's generator supply. If the ship's main radio did not fulfil this requirement, an auxiliary radio that did so should be installed.
- A requirement that operators and apparatus be directly under the authority of the vessel's "commanding officer".
- A requirement that all radio transmissions in the vicinity of a ship in distress be under the control of that ship.
- Assigned a priority to the transmission of weather and time signals to ships upon request, with area ships required to refrain from transmitting during these transmissions.

In addition, the delegates unanimously adopted a resolution that: "The International Radio-Telegraphic Conference having examined the measures to be taken with the view of preventing disasters at sea and of rendering assistance in such cases, expresses the opinion that, in the general interests of navigation, there should be imposed on certain classes of ships the obligation to carry a radio-telegraphic installation. As the Conference has no power to impose this obligation, it expresses the wish that the measures necessary to this end should be instituted by the Governments. The Conference finds it important, moreover, to ensure, as far as possible, uniformity in the arrangements to be adopted in the various countries to impose this obligation, and suggests to the Governments the desirability of an agreement between themselves with a view to the adoption of a uniform base for legislation."

The Service Regulations of the 1906 Convention had specified that stations should be assigned call letters that "shall be distinguishable from one another and each must be formed of a group of three letters", however no provisions were made for allocating call letter blocks among the various nations. Starting with the 1912 Convention, initial letters were allotted to the various signatories, including "A", "D" and "KAA–KCZ" to Germany and protectorates, "B", "G" and "M" to Great Britain plus "CAA–CMZ" to its associated jurisdictions, "F" and "UAA–UMZ" to France and its colonies, and "KDA–KZZ", "N" and "W" to the United States.

A third International Radiotelegraph Convention, initially proposed to take place in 1917 but delayed until 1927, was held in Washington, DC, which adopted regulations which became effective on January 1, 1929. The following countries were parties to the 1912 and 1927 conventions:

Signatory	1912	1927
Argentine Republic	✔	✔
Austria	✔	✔
Belgian Congo	✔	✔
Belgium	✔	✔
Bolivia		✔
Brazil	✔	✔
British India	✔	✔
Bulgaria	✔	✔
Canada	✔	✔
Chile	✔	✔
China		✔
Chosen		✔
Commonwealth of Australia	✔	✔
Costa Rica		✔
Cuba		✔
Curaçao		✔
Cyrenaica		✔
Czechoslovakia		✔
Denmark	✔	✔
Dominican Republic		✔
Dutch East Indies	✔	✔
Egypt	✔	✔
Erythrea		✔
Estonia		✔
Finland		✔
France	✔	✔
French Equatorial Africa and other Colonies	✔	✔
French Indo-China	✔	✔
French West Africa	✔	✔
Germany	✔	✔
Great Britain	✔	✔
Greece	✔	✔
Guatemala		✔
Hungary	✔	✔
Irish Free State		✔
Italian Somaliland		✔
Italy	✔	✔
Japan	✔	✔
Japanese Sakhalin	✔	✔
Kingdom of the Serbs, Croats and Slovenes		✔
Madagascar		✔
Mexico	✔	✔
Monaco	✔	
Morocco (with the exception of the Spanish Zone)		✔
New Zealand		✔
Nicaragua		✔
Norway	✔	✔
Paraguay		✔
Persia	✔	✔
Peru		✔
Poland		✔
Portugal	✔	✔
Portuguese East Africa	✔	✔
Portuguese Possessions in Asia	✔	✔
Portuguese West Africa	✔	✔
Republic of Colombia		✔
Republic of El Salvador		✔
Republic of Haiti		✔
Republic of Honduras		✔
Republic of Liberia		✔
Republic of Panama		✔
Republic of San Marino		✔
Roumania	✔	✔
Russia	✔	
Siam		✔
Spain	✔	✔
Spanish Colony of the Gulf of Guinea		✔
Surinam		✔
Sweden	✔	✔
Switzerland		✔
Syro-Libanese Territories		✔
Taiwan		✔
Kwantung Leased Territory and South Sea Islands under Japanese Mandate	✔	✔
Netherlands	✔	✔
Tripolitania		✔
Tunis	✔	✔
Turkey	✔	✔
Union of South Africa	✔	✔
United States	✔	✔
Uruguay	✔	✔
Venezuela		✔

== See also ==
- ITU prefix
- Q code
