= International Radiotelegraph Convention (1906) =

1906 international convention held in Berlin, Germany

The first International Radiotelegraph Convention (French: Convention Radiotélégraphique Internationale) was held in Berlin, Germany, in 1906. It reviewed radio communication (then known as "wireless telegraphy") issues, and was the first major convention to set international standards for ship-to-shore communication. One notable provision was the adoption of Germany's "SOS" distress signal as an international standard.

The resulting agreements were signed on November 3, 1906, and became effective on July 1, 1908. These standards remained in effect until they were updated at the second International Radiotelegraph Convention, held in London in 1912.

== Background ==
The Convention was initiated by Germany, which three years earlier had hosted a Preliminary Conference on Wireless Telegraphy that called for a subsequent formal conclave to expand on the issues discussed at the original conference. It was initially planned that the Convention would be held in 1904, however a series of events delayed the start by two years.

== Convention actions ==
The Convention convened on October 3, 1906, at Berlin, with an overall objective of establishing international standards for radio communication. While the 1903 conference had been attended by nine nations, the Convention expanded participation to twenty-seven countries. The resulting agreement, signed on November 3, 1906 and scheduled to take effect on July 1, 1908, consisted of four parts:

- Main Protocol: General agreement, consisting of twenty-three articles agreed to by all participants.
- Supplementary Agreement: Three intercommunication articles agreed to by all participants except Great Britain, Italy, Japan, Mexico, Persia and Portugal.
- Final Protocol: Seven articles covering organizational policies, agreed to by all participants.
- Service Regulations: Forty-two articles detailing with implementation of the protocols, agreed to by all participants.

A major area of controversy was a requirement for unlimited access to all "public service" stations, even when the communicating stations were operated by different companies. At this time the Marconi Company had a policy of refusing to communicate, except in the case of emergency, with stations operated by other companies. There was concern this would result in a Marconi monopoly, that would also give its home country, Great Britain, as much domination in international radio communication as it already held in international undersea telegraph cables. As was the case at the preliminary conference in 1903, Marconi Company officials strongly objected to this interconnection requirement, on the grounds that competing systems were all infringing on Marconi patents, and this also would allow "freeloading" on the extensive network of Marconi coast stations which had been constructed at great expense.

The intercommunication issue was directly addressed by Article I of the supplemental protocol: "Each ship station indicated in Article 1 of the Convention shall be bound to intercommunicate with every other ship station without regard to the particular system of radiotelegraphy adopted by these stations respectively.". Because of their close ties with the Marconi interests, six countries, most notably Great Britain and Italy, were unwilling to agree to support this provision.
