= SS Deutschland (1900) =

German passenger ship

Coordinates: 51°40′N 1°37′E

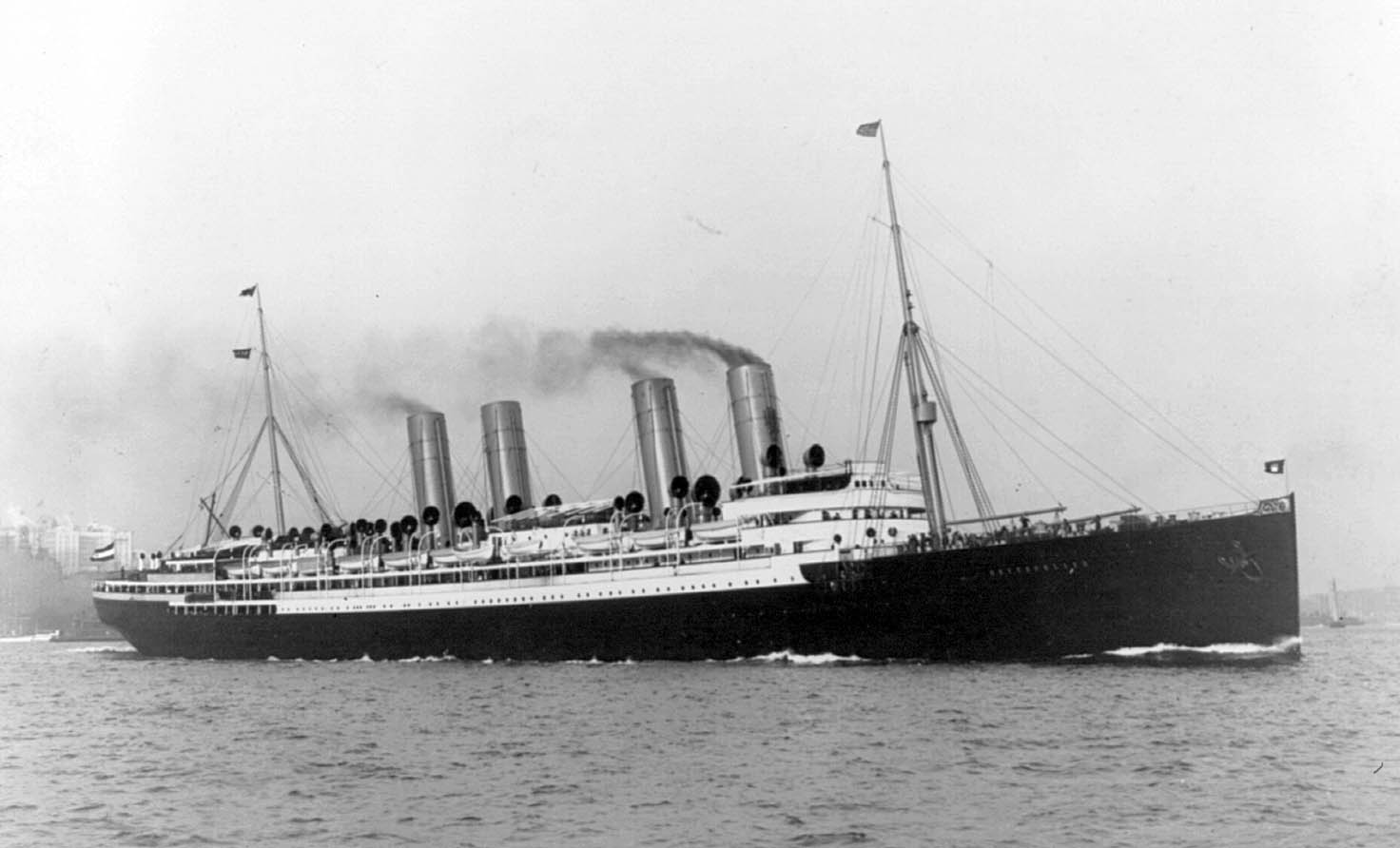
- SS Deutschland

History

German Empire
- Name: 1900–1910: Deutschland; 1910–1920: Viktoria Luise; 1920–1925: Hansa
- Owner: Hamburg America Line
- Port of registry: Hamburg, Germany
- Route: Transatlantic
- Ordered: 1899
- Builder: AG Vulcan, Stettin
- Cost: 12.500.000 Mark
- Yard number: 244
- Laid down: 1899
- Launched: 10 January 1900
- Completed: June 1900
- Acquired: 25 June 1900
- Maiden voyage: 5 July 1900
- In service: 1900–1925
- Out of service: 1925
- Fate: Sold for scrap in France 1925

General characteristics
- Type: Ocean liner
- Tonnage: 16,502 GRT, 5,196 NRT (1900) 16,703 GRT, 8,127 NRT (1910, as Viktoria Luise) 16,376 GRT, 8,258 NRT (1920, as Hansa)
- Displacement: 23,200 metric tons (22,800 long tons; 25,600 short tons)
- Length: 207.2 m (679 ft 9 in) o/a
- Beam: 20.52 m (67 ft 4 in)
- Draft: 8.5 m (27 ft 11 in)
- Decks: 6
- Installed power: 34.000 ihp (25.354 kW)
- Propulsion: 2 × 4-bladed propellers
- Speed: 23 knots (43 km/h; 26 mph)
- Capacity: 1.283 passengers in three classes
- Complement: in World War I; 22 officers, 448 enlisted
- Armament: in World War I; 4 x 10.5 cm (4.1 in) guns; 4 x 3.7 cm (1.5 in) revolver guns

SS Deutschland was a passenger liner built in Stettin and launched on 10 January 1900 for the Hamburg America Line (HAPAG) of Germany. She was officially the second ocean liner to have four funnels on the transatlantic route, the first being Kaiser Wilhelm der Grosse of 1897.

The Deutschland took away the Blue Riband from the Kaiser Wilhelm der Grosse on her maiden voyage and held the west-bound record for over seven years, until Cunard took it back to Britain with the RMS Lusitania in 1907. Despite holding the record she suffered from persistent vibrations, especially in the stern area which gave her the nickname "The Cocktail Shaker" and made her unpopular with 1st class passengers.

Although her vibration problems were finally fixed around 1907, it was already too late, as she has lost the speed record to Cunard, and the direct competition had grander, larger and safer ships, so in 1910 she was pulled from the transatlantic route and refitted into the world's second fully dedicated cruise liner. As Victoria Luise she was enormously popular with the travelling public, and as she was about to start her third around-the-world cruise World War I broke out and she was requisitioned as an auxiliary cruiser.

However, because of her conversion into a cruise ship, her engines were throttled to a maximum speed of 17 knots (31 km/h; 20 mph). And after a fire that broke out during her conversion into a cruiser, it was decided to abandon the preparations, and she was left standing at her pier till the end of World War I.

After the war, she was in such a bad state that the Allies were not interested in seizing her as war reparations. In 1920, HAPAG decided to convert her into an immigrant ship and she was once again put on the Atlantic under a new name: Hansa. By 1921, as the United States introduced new immigration laws, she steadily became unprofitable, and was ultimately sold for scrap in 1925.

== Construction ==
After the introduction of Kaiser Wilhelm der Grosse by the Norddeutscher Lloyd and its enormous success with the travelling public, in 1899 the HAPAG board of directors has voted for once again building a greyhound for the transatlantic route despite the clear protests from the general director Albert Ballin, who argued that "the race for speed is futile, the line should focus on constructing big, safe and comfortable ocean liners".

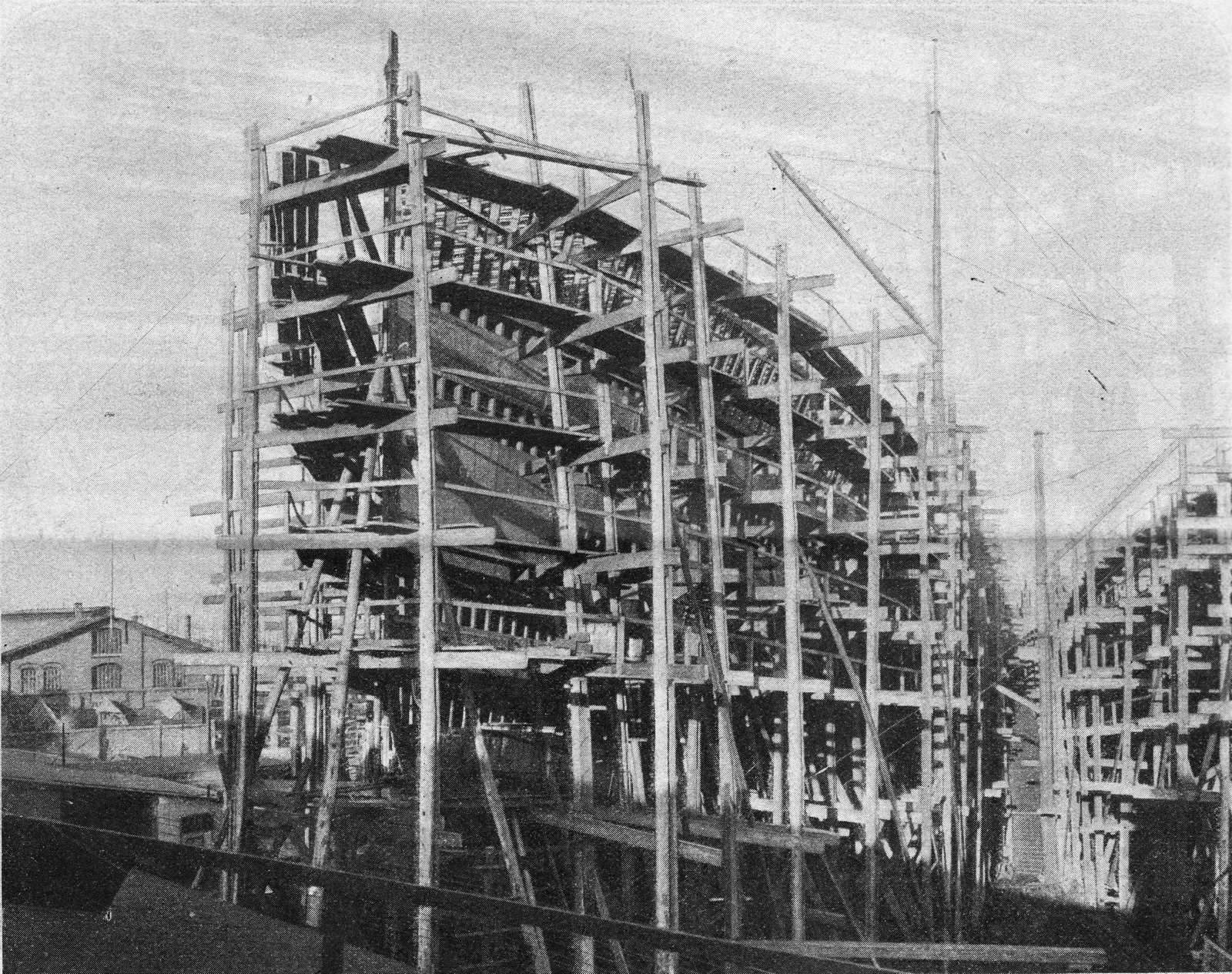
Hull of Deutschland under construction

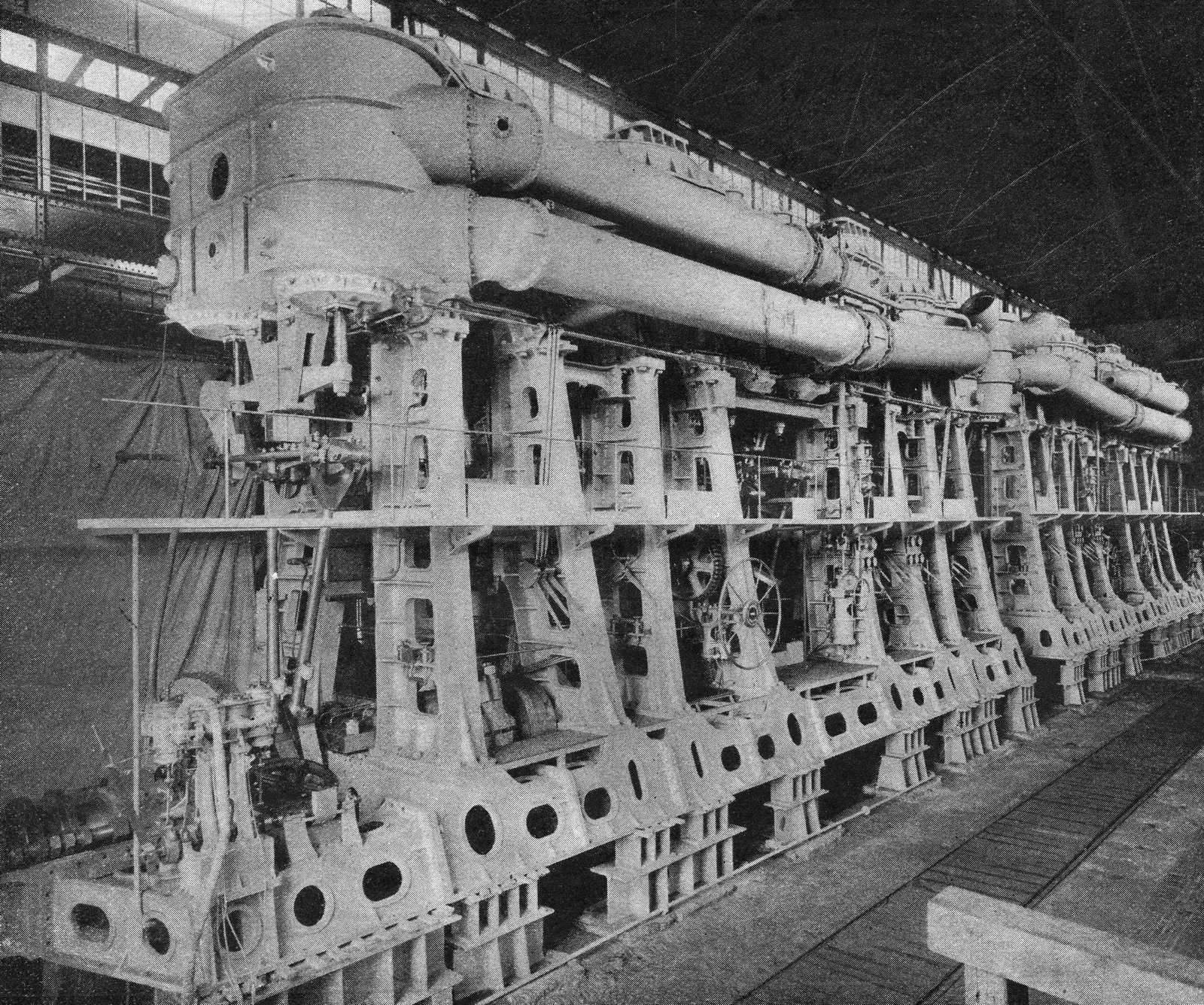
2 crank shaft, Quadruple expansion steam engines before the fitting

As the Shipyard of choice, the line approached the Stettiner Vulcan Werft, the same yard that constructed their direct competition, the Kaiser Wilhelm der Grosse. With the newly approaching 20th century, HAPAG decided that Deutschland should be a culmination of all newest technologies, styles and trends.

She was the third biggest ship on the world, after the Great Eastern, and the RMS Oceanic. She was outfitted with all the newest marine technologies that were available on the market, she had an early system of automatic watertight doors that could be closed off from the bridge at any time, an advanced steam recycling system, pneumatic tube messaging system, and a powerful pair of, double stroke, quadruple expansion steam engines with extra cylinders above the intermediate cylinders. Which gave her a maximum horsepower of 34,000 (Although on one voyage it was reported that 37,800 were reached.).

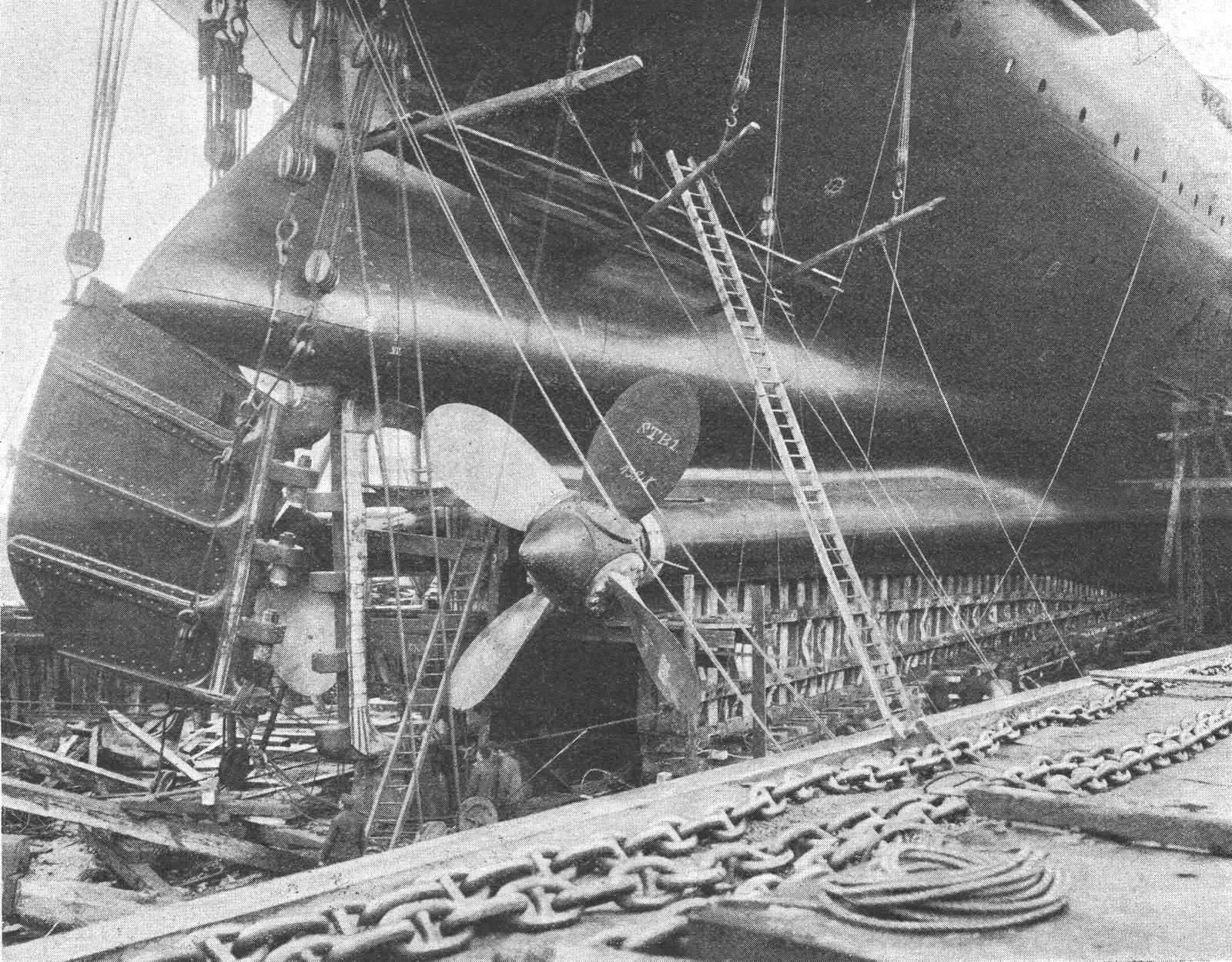
The fitting of the rudder on the completed hull

Deutschland's construction number was 244 and the keel was laid down around the end of 1899. During the entire time of the construction newspapers were boasting about the construction of the ship and reporting on all the newest methods of construction being used. The ship was launched on the 10 January 1900 by the Kaiser's family themselves. The fitting out process finished on the 25 June 1900.

The ship in Germany would originally be addressed with the "Schnelldampfer", "Doppelschraubenschnelldampfer" or with the more prestigious previx, "Reichspostdamper".

== Interior ==
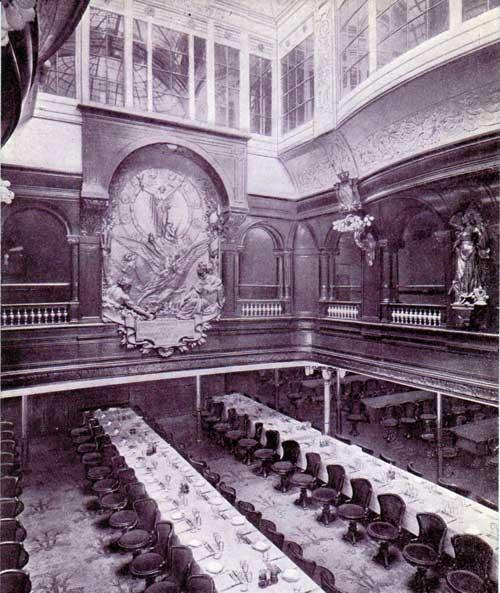
1st class dining room skylight

Comfort wise, Deutschland had a whole new interior style be developed for it, as up to this point HAPAG was copying the styles of the NDL ships, the "Jugend Stil" or a more simplistic version of Art Nouveau was chosen, as it was an emerging popular style in Western Europe at that time which was being associated with modernity.

Deutschland's first-class accommodation which was in the center of the ship, spread out on five decks could accommodate up to 693 first class passengers. The central piece of the ship was its skylight spanning four decks, it provided natural light to the music room, grand staircase and the dining salon. The newspapers of that time were calling it: "the worlds most beautiful skylight".

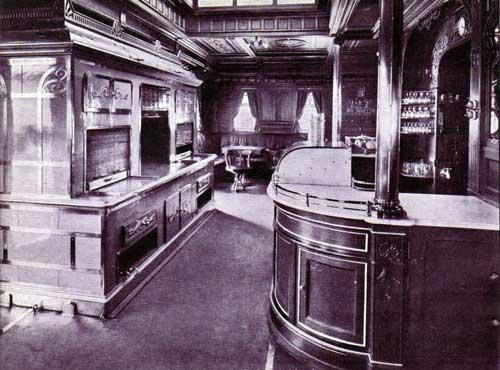
Grill Room onboard Deutschland

On the boat-deck, in the center of the ship was the first class entrance, with a couple of staterooms, a printers office for onboard newspaper (the SS Deutschland was the first ocean liner to feature such facilities) and a nursery. Although around 1902/3 it was rebuilt into the 'Vienna café' with light colors and golden details, the waiters were dressed in slightly "oriental uniforms" to further "exotify" the café. The reason for the replacement of the nursery is unknown, but it might be possible that around that time HAPAG decided to let the children dine with their parents in the main dining saloon, a practice that was rather uncommon at that time in the elite circles.

At the stern of the ship besides a couple of staterooms, was the 'Grill room', a small restaurant similar to the later a la carte restaurant found on White Star Line's Olympic-class liners. It was run by an independent restaurant staff from brought from Berlin, the style of the restaurant is supposed to remind the diner of an authentic German mountain "Gasthaus". The woodwork was out of mahogany and in the center of the room except for the skylight and a bar was big green ceramic tiled oven, that was used to grill/prepare the dishes in front of the customers table.

On A deck was the music room/lounge kept in white colors with a golden wallpaper, smoking room with a big central skylight, a painting showing Hamburg harbor and a statue on either side representing trade and the market. The whole room was kept in a light blue color scheme.

B deck consisted mainly of first class staterooms, four suites, each in a different style. As well as a barber shop and purses office.

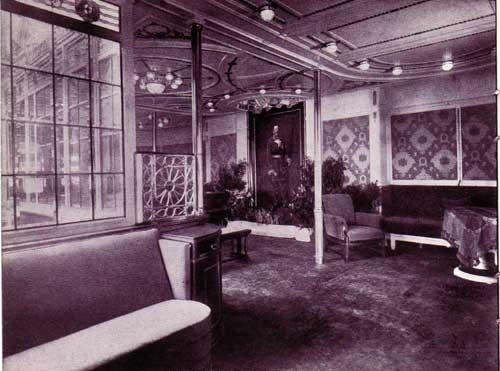
1st class music room

C deck had the first class dining saloon, made out of mahogany with red Japanese wallpaper on the walls and a light beige carpeting.

Second class accommodations were in the same styles as those in first class, they were however much smaller. The second class dining room could accommodate all 302 second class passengers in one sitting. This differed from the first class dining saloon which could only seat half of all first class passengers at once.

Third class was positioned towards the bow of the ship. The style and nature of 3rd class accommodation was similar to that in the Kaiser Wilhelm der Grosse.

== Career ==
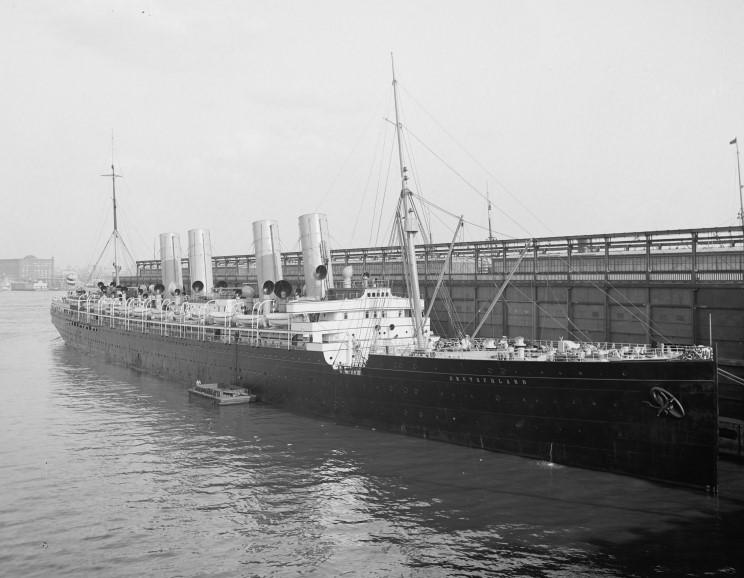
Deutschland docked in New York around 1903

Deutschland left Bremerhaven on 5 July 1900, commanded by Captain Adolf Albers with a stop at Cherbourg and Plymouth bound for New York. She crossed by Sandy Hook in 5 days, 11 hours and 5 min. with an average 23.51 knots (43.54 km/h; 27.05 mph). She won the Blue Riband from Kaiser Wilhelm der Grosse, the fanfare both in Germany and the US was big, Kaiser Wilhelm II himself sent a telegram to HAPAG with the words "Bravo Deutschland!" congratulating her on breaking the record.

On the way back they broke the eastbound record averaging 23.38 knots (43.30 km/h; 26.91 mph). with 5 days 11 hours and 45 minutes. Among the fanfare however, it became clear that the ship had vibration problems, especially when reaching high speeds. Second class passengers felt it the worst as they were situated in the stern of the ship where the vibrations were the strongest. A year later she was drydocked in Stettin where her propellers were replaced to try to minimize the problem, but to no avail.

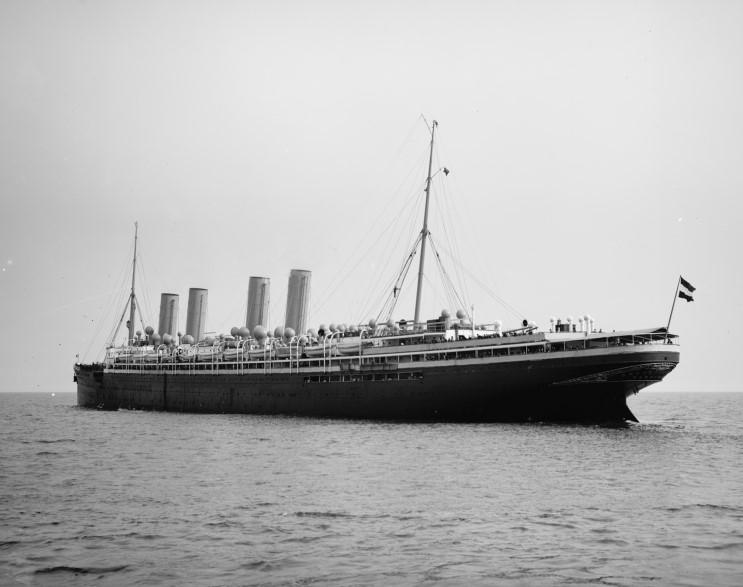
Deutschland near New York, 1903

In March 1902, she played a role in the Deutschland incident. When she was carrying Prince Henry, the brother of the Kaiser back to Europe from a highly publicized visit to the United States, the ship was prevented from using her Slaby-d'Arco system of wireless telegraphy as the Marconi radio stations refused its radio traffic through their nets and blocked the rival system. Prince Henry—who tried to send wireless messages to both the U.S. and Germany—was outraged. During a later conference, the Marconi company was forced to give access to their stations to other companies. This incident turned out to be one of the important moments in the early history of wireless transmission.

Also in 1902, during a rough storm returning from New York, Deutschland's whole rudder along with a part of her keel were ripped off her stern, the ship had to be maneuvered to Europe and the dock using only her propellers. This exhausted Captain Albers to such an extent that during her docking in Bremerhaven he collapsed in the chart room in the hands of his first officer and died of a heart attack.

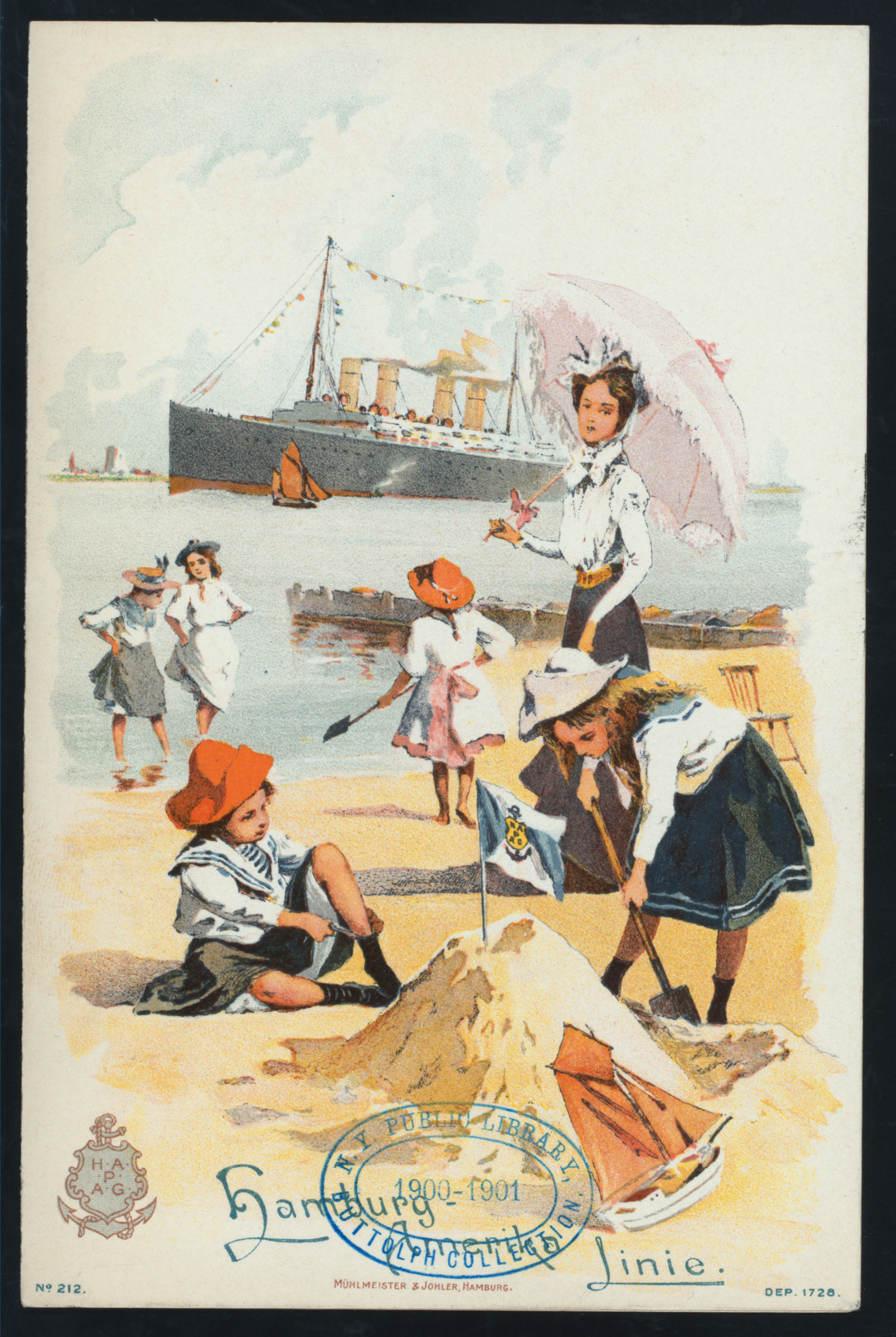
Menu from the "Auguste Victoria" showing Deutschland

It was also in 1902 that John Jacob Astor travelled on Deutschland to New York in one of her suites on the B Deck. He would perish in 1912 on the maiden voyage of the Titanic.

In July 1903, while leaving Bremerhaven a schooner got a bit too close to the ship and her sails got caught up in the railing of the ship. The boat started getting sucked up by the ship's propellers. The ship's captain ordered a full stop and for a lifeboat to be lowered to rescue the crew of the schooner. The voyage recommenced after the boat was freed and the excitement subsided.

On 17 July 1906, Deutschland collided with a stone pier when departing the Port of Dover for New York, her engines having been put into forward rather than reverse. The ship's bow was damaged causing the voyage to be abandoned, with Deutschland being repaired at Southampton.

In 1907, the ship's vibration problems were finally solved by adjusting the angle of the propeller blades and a partial rebuild of her stern, mainly the keel and rudder area. But by that time, Cunard's RMS Lusitania took back the eastbound record. She kept on sailing for three more years before finally being pulled from the transatlantic service.

== Victoria Luise ==
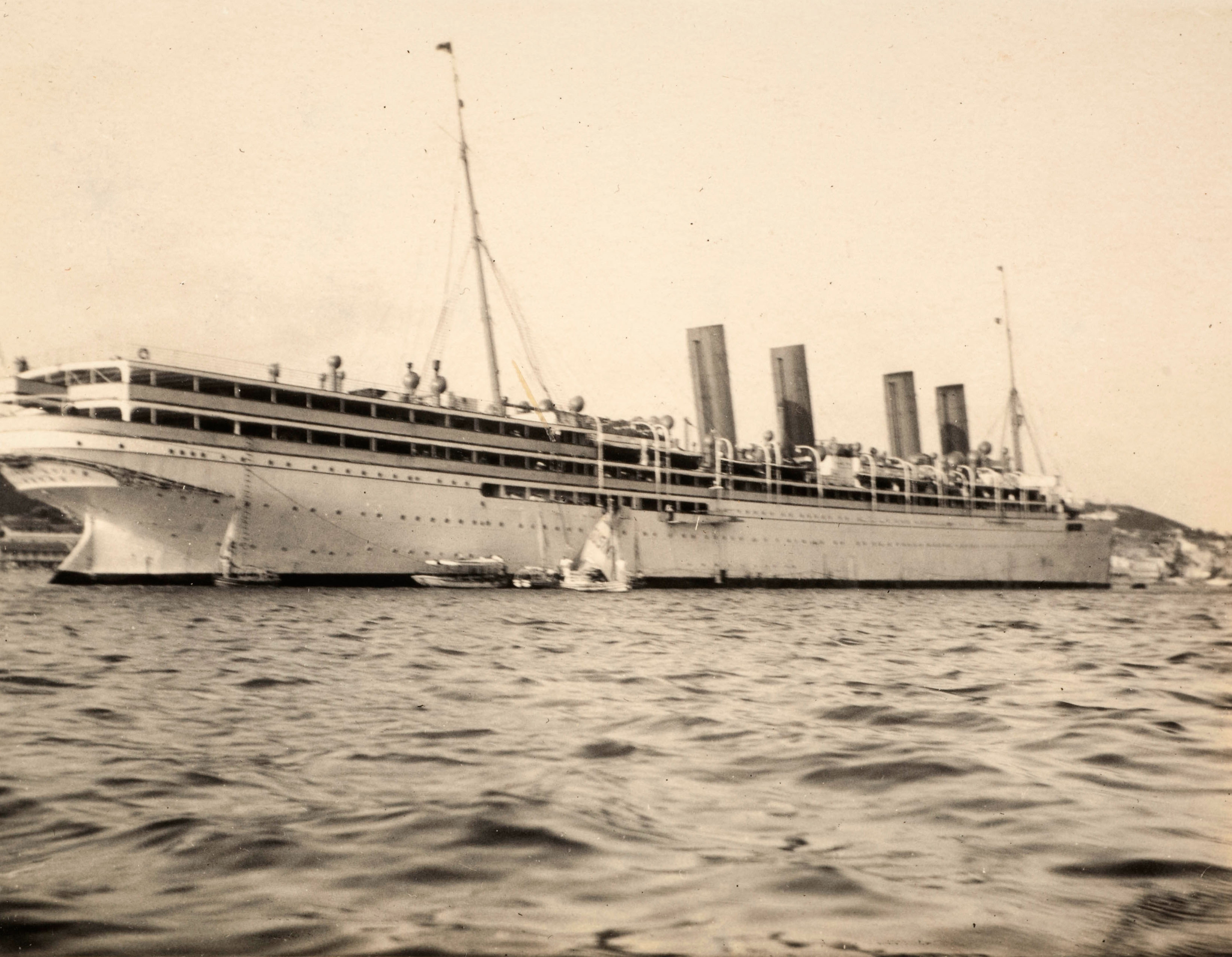
Victoria Luise seen docked at Havana, around 1912

She became one of the first cruise liners of the 20th century. Her original engines were derated as a high service speed was no longer needed. At the same time, the exterior of the ship was repainted in all white and her passenger capacity was also reduced to only 500 first-class passengers.

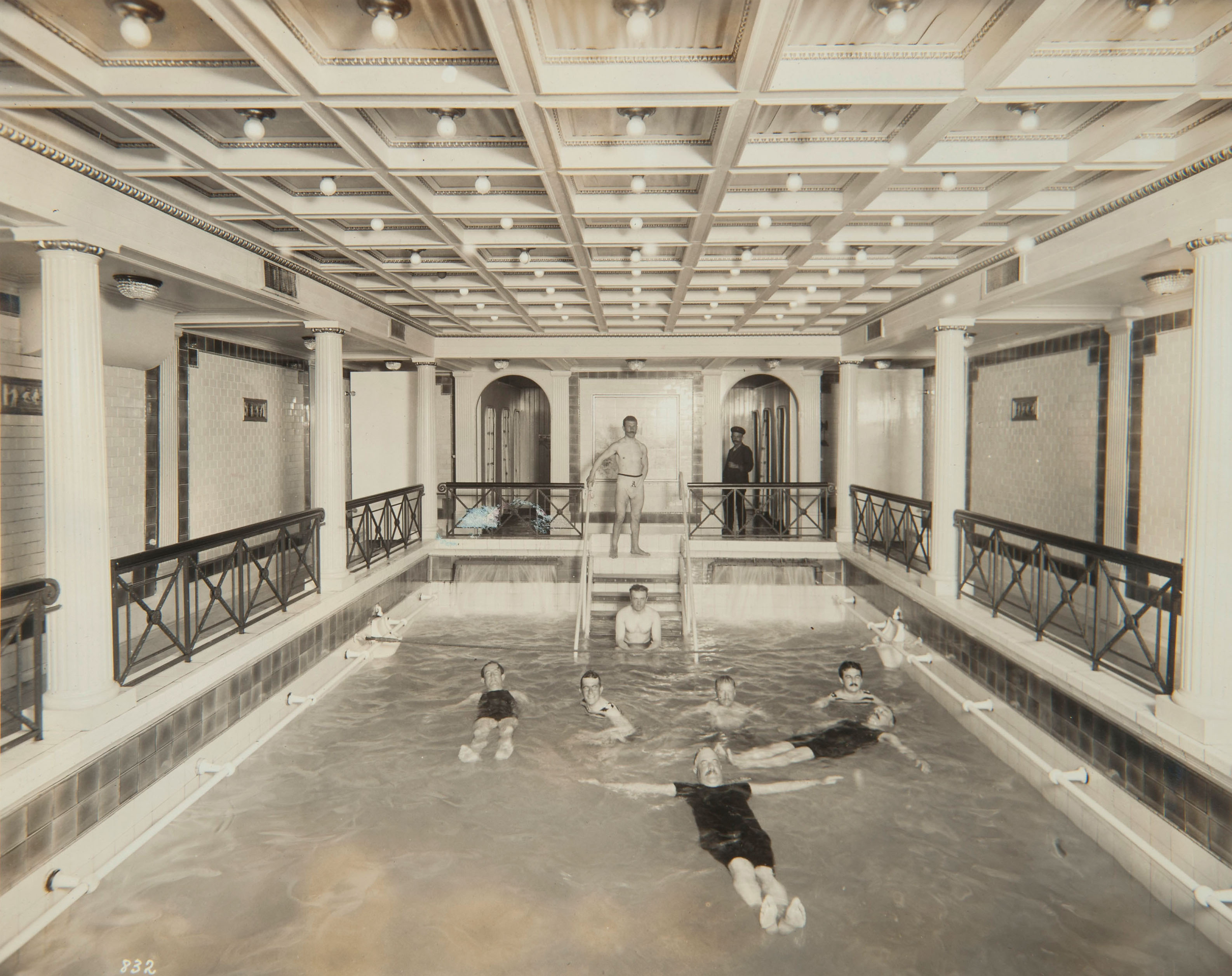
Swimming pool onboard the Victoria Luise, around 1912

Her interiors were mainly left intact except for the removal of service rooms behind the third funnel, and the construction of a ballroom with a parquet dance floor. The grill room was repurposed into a tea room, the Vienna café got replaced by staterooms and on the boat deck a film developing room was made. Another novelty addition was a swimming pool located a deck below the dining saloon. This would make her one of the first ships to have a swimming pool, the first being the White Star Line's RMS Adriatic.

She was also given a new name, Victoria Luise. She replaced their first purpose-built cruise ship of similar name (Prinzessin Victoria Luise) that ran aground and was destroyed off the coast of Jamaica in 1906.

On 8 June 1914, Victoria Luise ran aground in the Elbe and developed a list. Her engine rooms flooded. She was later refloated, repaired, and returned to service.

In World War I, Victoria Luise was converted for use as an auxiliary cruiser, but because of her still-troublesome engines, she was not used as such by the Imperial German Navy.

== Hansa ==
In 1920, she was pressed into emigrant carrier service and renamed Hansa. During the renaming, Hansa had two funnels removed and had some of her interiors refitted. She became a full 3rd class liner, for exception of the 36 2nd class spots.

The United States passed the Emergency Quota Act in 1921 and the even more restrictive Immigration Act of 1924, which substantially reduced the emigrant trade from Europe. Ultimately Hansa was sold for scrap in 1925.

== Gallery ==
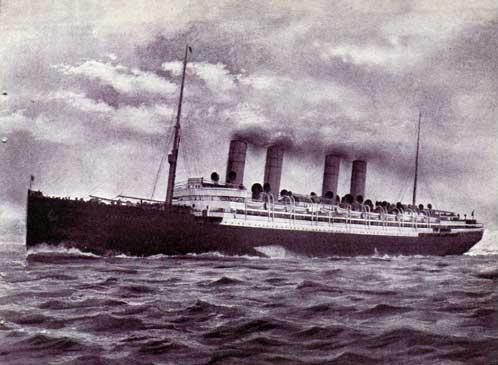
Deutschland in the open seas in 1906

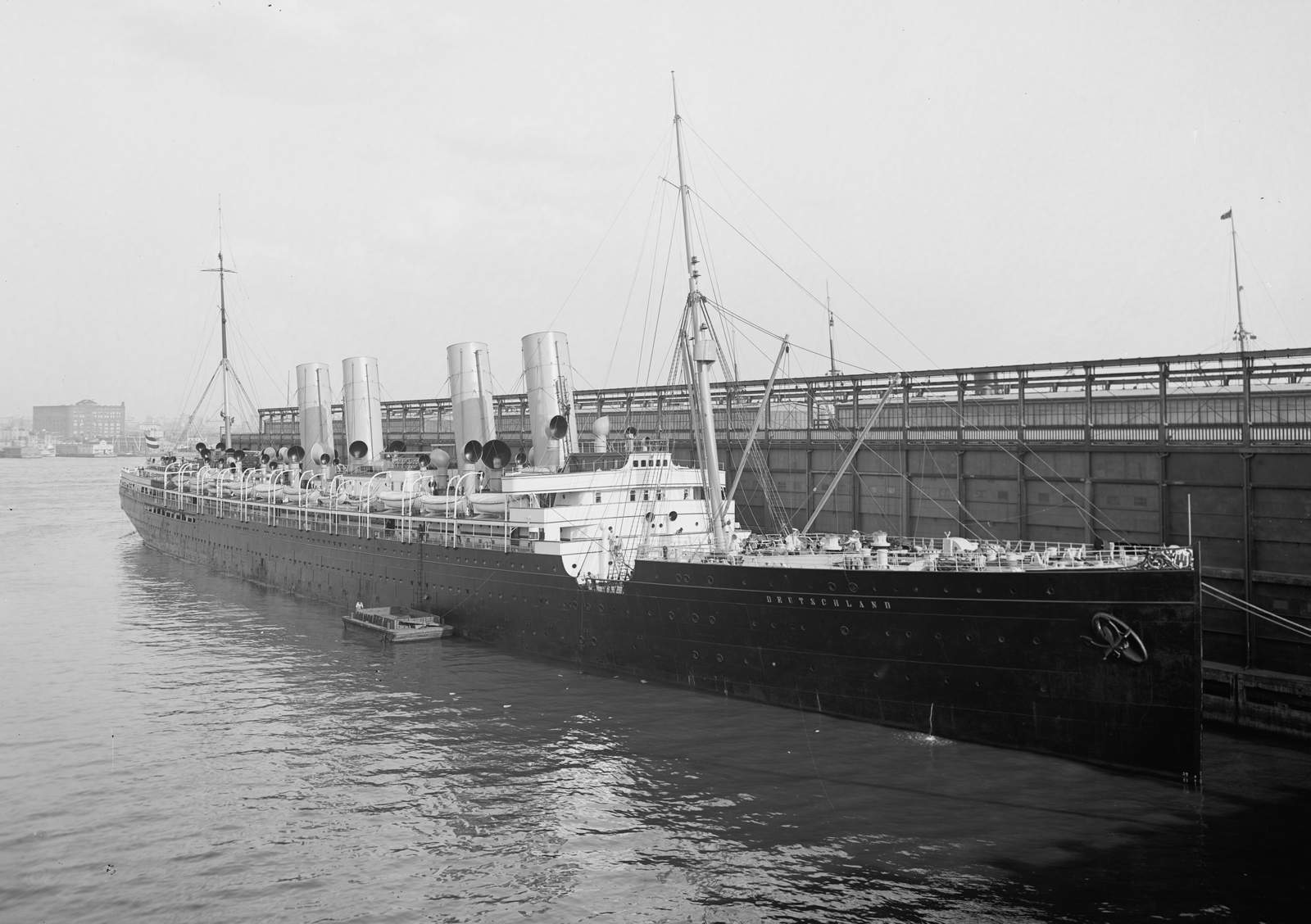
The ship in 1905

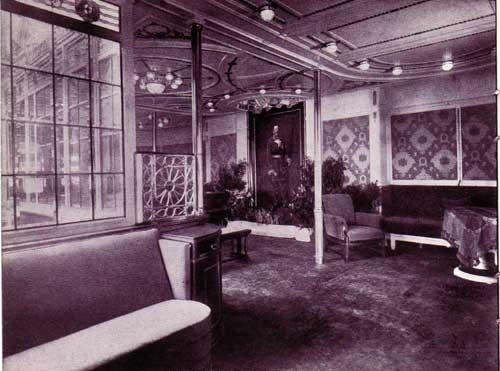
First Class Ladies Parlour of Deutschland

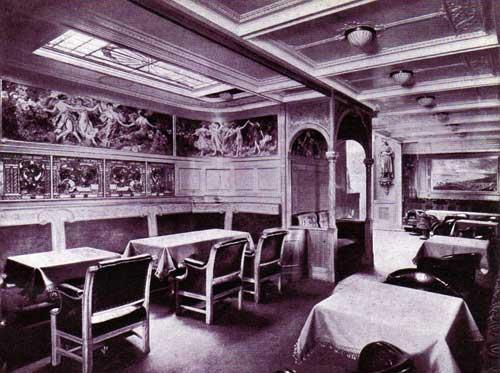
First Class Smoking Room of Deutschland

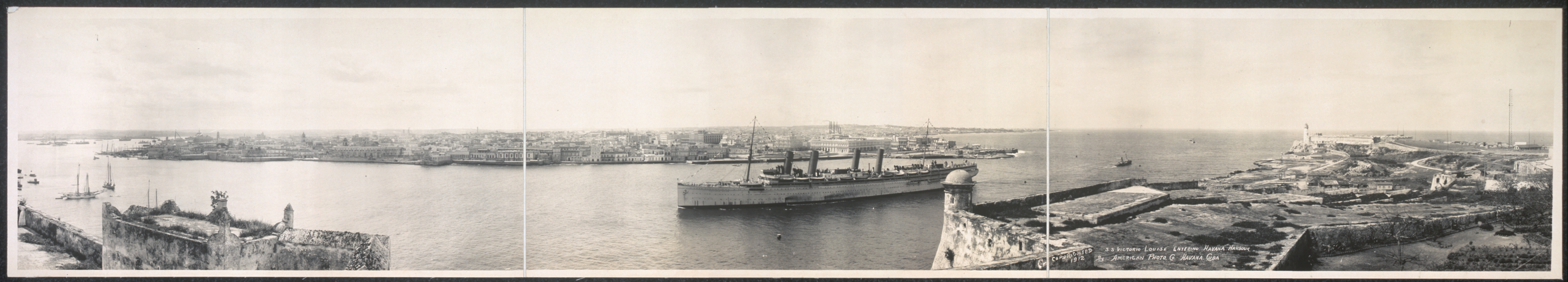
Panorama view of Panama with Victoria Luise entering the harbor

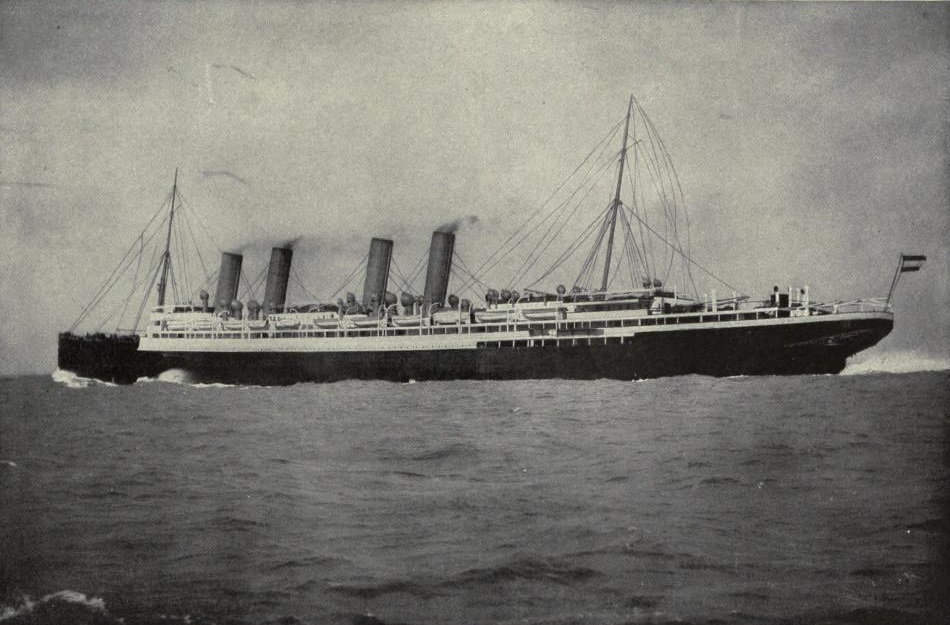
Deutschland speeding through the Atlantic, around 1901

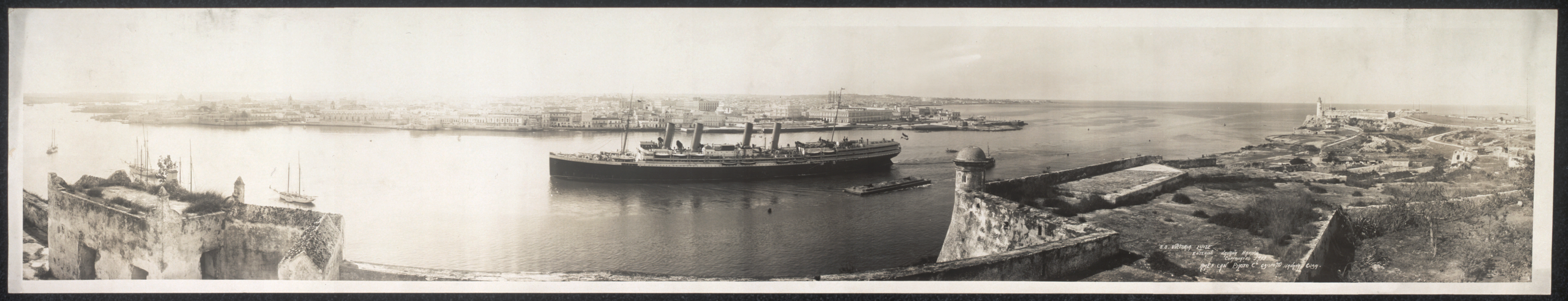
Panorama view of Havana Harbor with Victoria Luise, different paint scheme

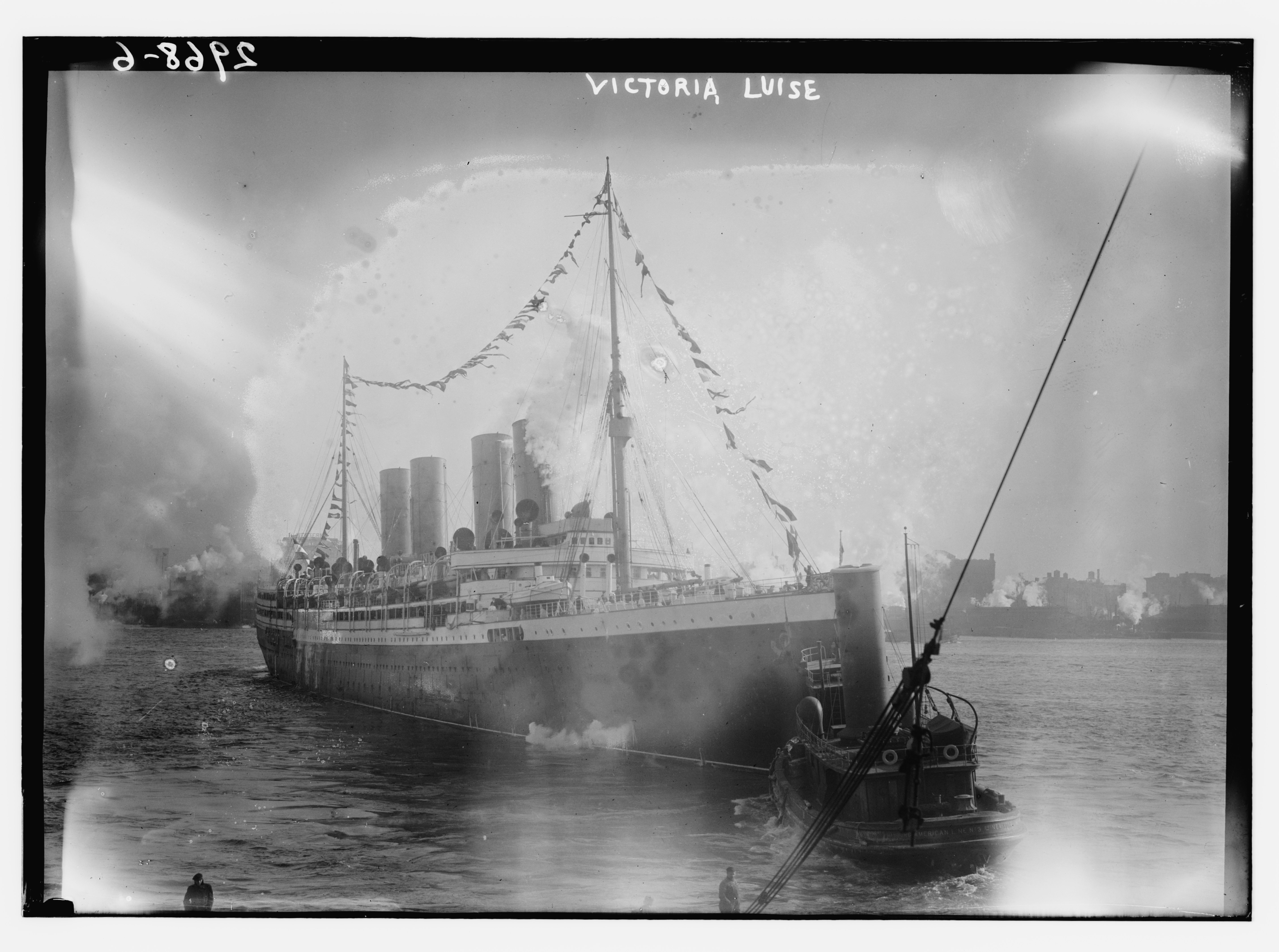
Entering New York, around 1911

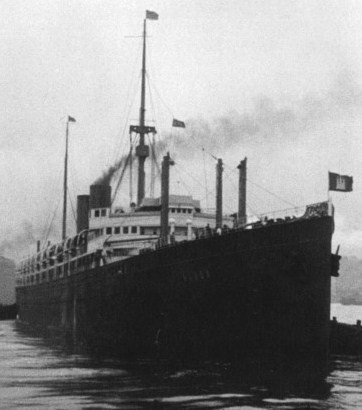
Hansa in 1921

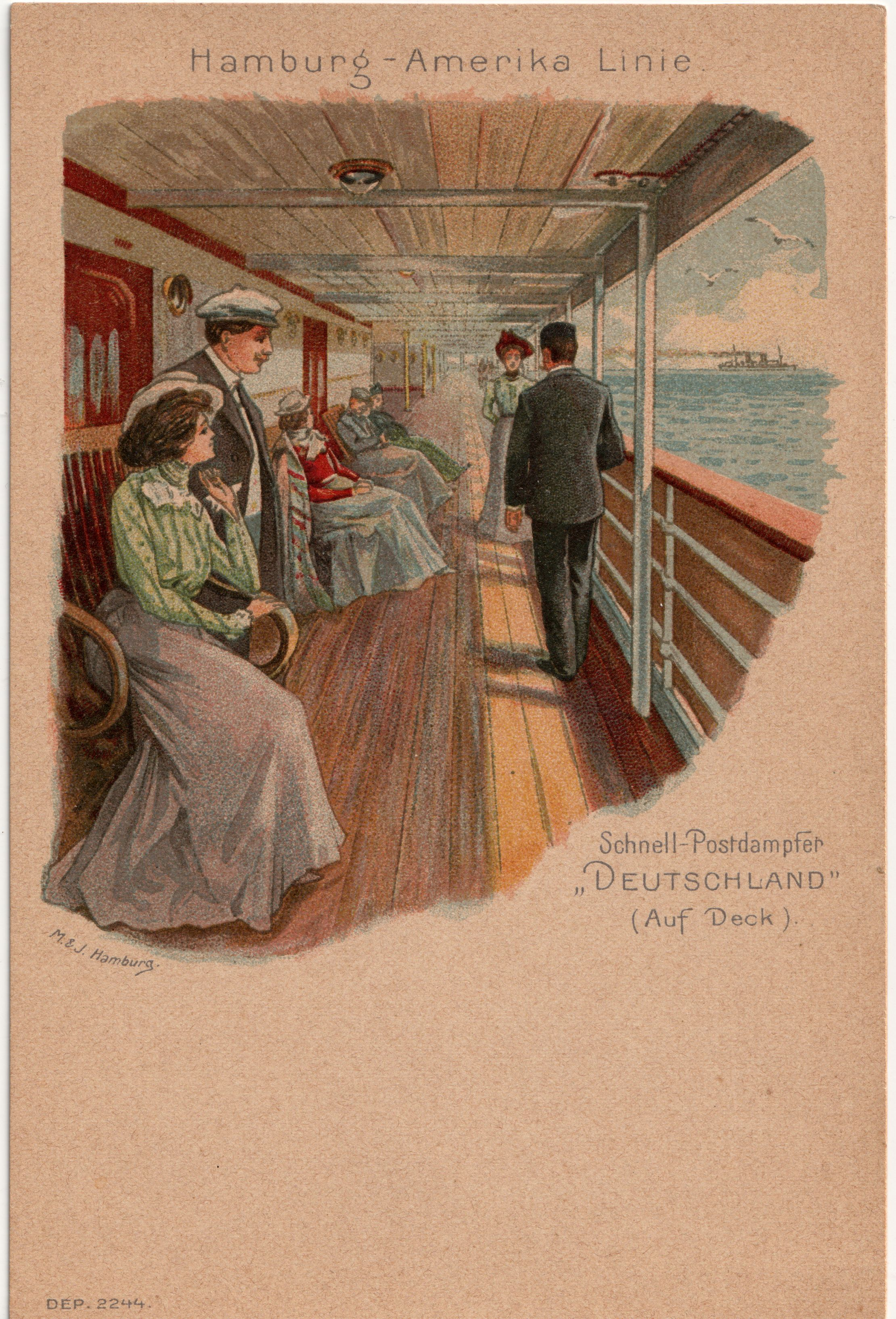
Hamburg-America Line SS Deutschland deck

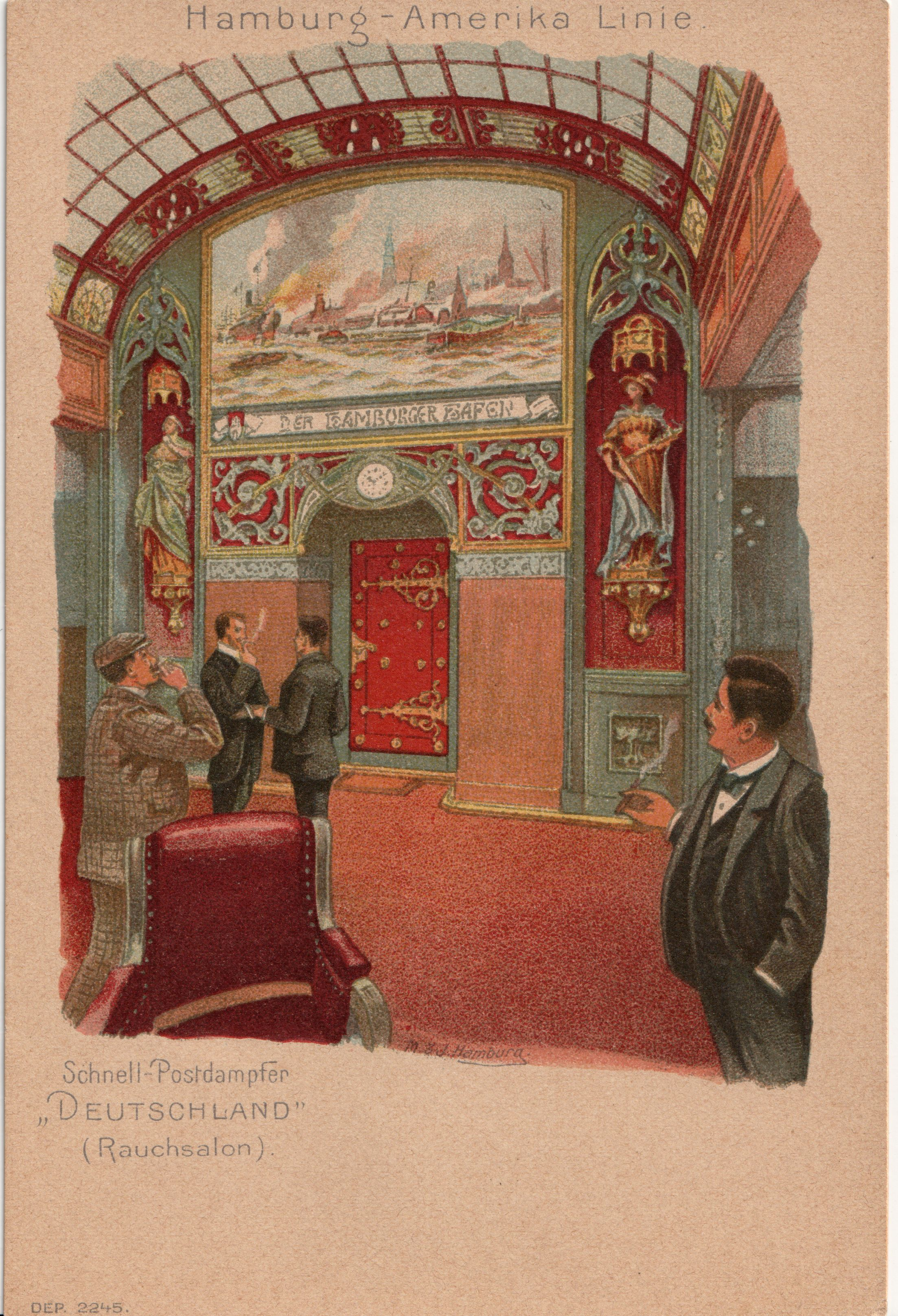
Hamburg-America Line SS Deutschland smoking room

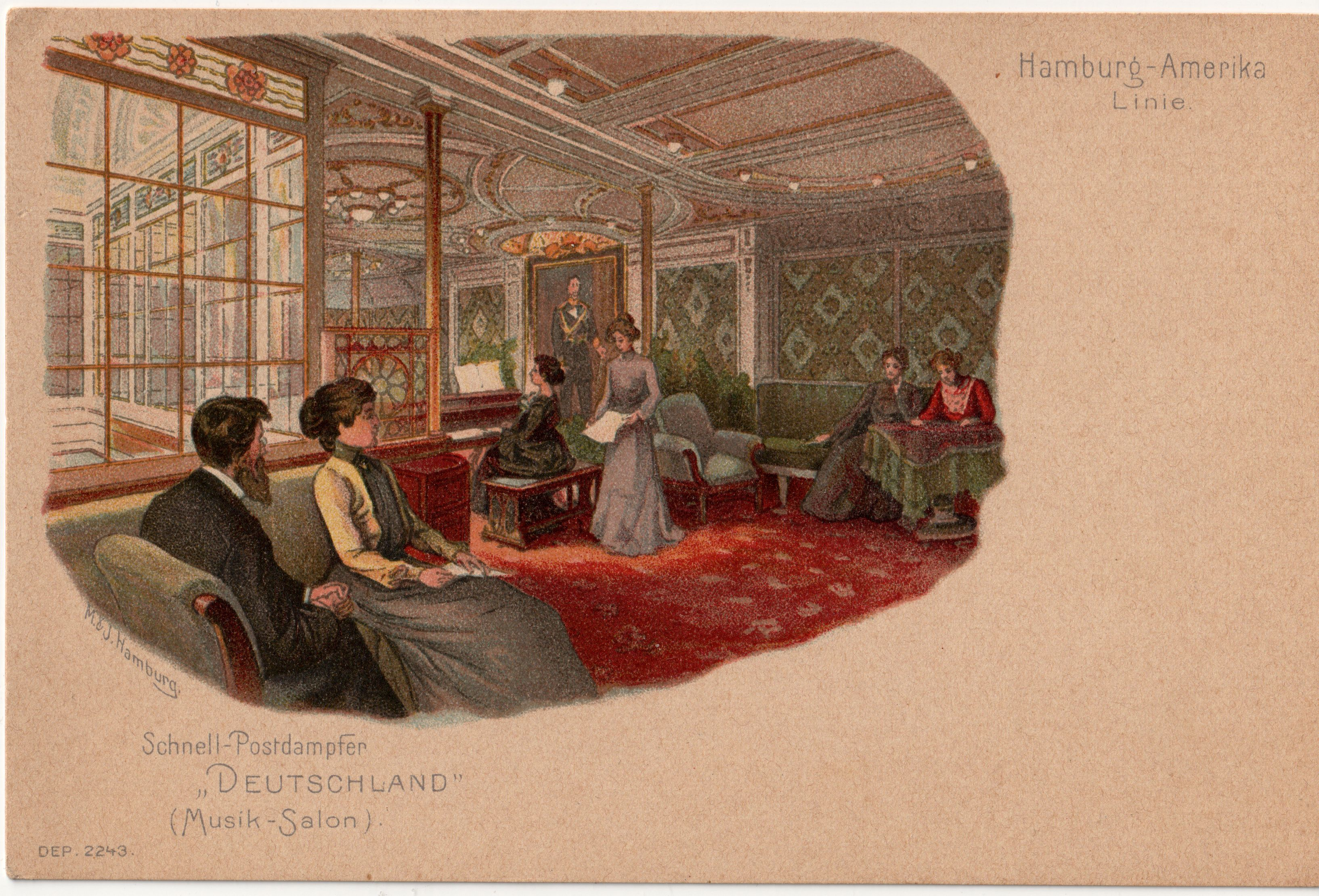
Hamburg-America Line SS Deutschland music room

Records
| Preceded by Kaiser Wilhelm der Grosse | Holder of the Blue Riband (Westbound record); 1900–1902 | Succeeded by Kronprinz Wilhelm |
| Preceded by Kaiser Wilhelm der Grosse | Blue Riband (Eastbound Record); 1900–1904 | Succeeded by Kaiser Wilhelm II |
| Preceded by Kronprinz Wilhelm | Blue Riband (Westbound record); 1903–1907 | Succeeded by Lusitania |
