= Deutschland incident (1902) =

Maritime radio dispute

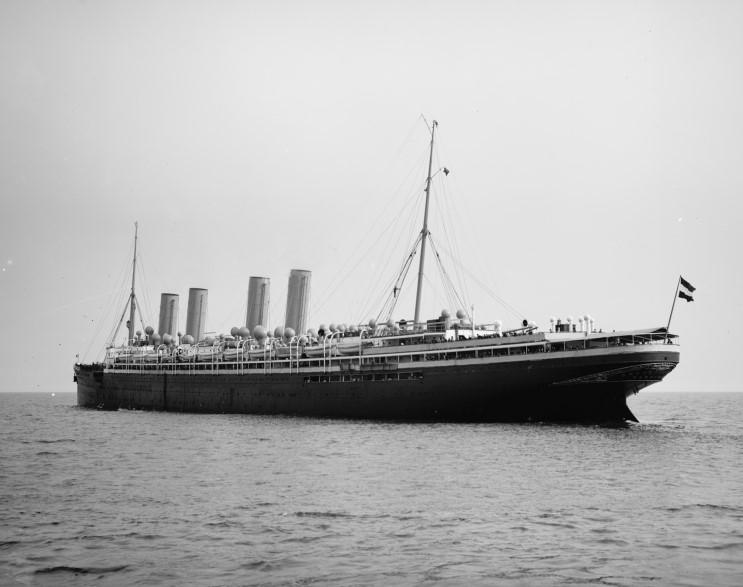

The Deutschland incident of 1902 occurred in March of that year, and resulted from the refusal of Marconi Company coastal radio (then known as "wireless telegraphy") stations to provide services to shipboard stations that were operated by competing companies.

In 1901, the New York Herald arranged to have Marconi company equipment installed on a lightship anchored off of Nantucket, Massachusetts. This station was intended to provide service to maritime traffic, especially vessels approaching New York harbor after making an Atlantic crossing. However, one of the installation conditions was that, except during emergencies, the Marconi-employed Nantucket operators would not communicate with any vessels using non-Marconi equipment.

Marconi company representatives claimed that this policy was justified because in their view all other radio systems were infringements on Guglielmo Marconi's basic patents, and also because other companies should not be allowed to take advantage of the coastal stations they had constructed at great expense. This was challenged by the competing companies, which insisted that they had developed non-infringing systems, in addition to the fact that, in countries such as Great Britain and Italy, government policies had given Marconi a practical monopoly in establishing shore stations.

SS Deutschland was a Hamburg America Line German passenger steamer equipped with Slaby-d'Arco radio equipment. As the ship was beginning a transatlantic crossing to Germany, one of the passengers, Prince Heinrich of Prussia, brother of the German Kaiser, attempted to send a wireless telegram through Nantucket thanking U.S. President Theodore Roosevelt for his recent hospitality. However, the Nantucket station refused to accept the message because the vessel did not have a Marconi installation. This refusal to establish communication was later repeated by the Marconi shore station at Lizard, located in south Cornwall, England.

These events brought the Marconi non-communication policy to international attention. Although commercial radio communication was only a few years old, the dispute emphasized the need for an international policy to establish ground rules for service requirements. The German government sent out diplomatic notes asking for participation in a conference to address the issue, and the next year it sponsored a Preliminary Conference on Wireless Telegraphy, attended by representatives from eight major countries. This was the first international body reviewing radio communication policies, and the subject of requiring interconnection between stations operated by various companies was a major issue addressed by the participants.

== See also ==
- Open access (infrastructure)
- Preliminary Conference on Wireless Telegraphy
