= Marconi (disambiguation) =

Marconi may refer to:

== Family name ==
- Enrico Marconi (1792-1863) was an Italian-Polish architect.
- Guglielmo Marconi (1874–1937) was an Italian radio pioneer.
- Jean Marconi (1906–1971), French actor
- Joe Marconi (1934-1992) was an American football player.
- Leandro Marconi (1834-1919) was a Polish architect, son of Enrico.
- Leonard Marconi (1835-1899) was a Polish architect and sculptor.
- Rocco Marconi (1490–1529) was an Italian painter.
- Władysław Marconi (1848-1915) was a Polish architect, son of Enrico.

== Businesses ==
- Marconi Company, a British telecommunications company; now part of General Electric Company (GEC)
  - Marconi Electronic Systems, the former defence arm of GEC
  - Marconi plc, the former telecommunications arm of GEC
- Marconi Corporation plc, a British telecommunications company formed by the 2003 restructuring of Marconi plc
  - Marconi Communications, the former telecommunications arm of GEC, now part of Marconi Corporation plc
- Marconi Instruments, a former British electronic instruments company
- Telent, a successor company of Marconi plc
- Alenia Marconi Systems, a former British-Italian defence electronics company
- Matra Marconi Space, a former Franco-British aerospace company
- Marconi Wireless Telegraph Company of America (1899–1919), a U.S. subsidiary of the parent British firm; now the Radio Corporation of America

== Places ==
- Marconi (crater), a lunar impact crater
- Marconi National Historic Sites of Canada, Nova Scotia
- Marconi, California, United States

=== Metro stations in Italy ===
- Marconi (Brescia Metro)
- Marconi (Rome Metro)
- Marconi (Turin Metro)

== Other uses ==
- Marconi (mountain), Peru
- Marconi (surname)
- Marconi-class submarine, Italian class of submarine
- Marconi University, Italy

== See also ==
- Marconi scandal was a British political scandal that broke in mid-1912.
- Marconi Station, a list of wireless stations
- Marconi Wireless Station Site (disambiguation)
- Marconia (disambiguation)
