= Marconi Wireless Station Site =

Marconi Wireless Station Site may refer to one of many Marconi Stations, including:

== Cape Cod, Barnstable County, Massachusetts ==
- Marconi Wireless Station Site (South Wellfleet, Massachusetts), from 1901 to 1917
- Marconi–RCA Wireless Receiving Station, from 1914 to the 1990s
  - Chatham Marconi Maritime Center, a museum and WA1WCC amateur radio station site

== Kahuku, Hawaii ==
- Marconi Wireless Telegraphy Station (Kahuku, Hawaii)

== Elsewhere in North America ==
- New Brunswick Marconi Station, in Somerset, New Jersey, opened in 1914, and used by the U.S. Navy as station NFF from 1917 to 1918
- Marconi and Marconi Wireless Station National Historic Sites, 2 sites on Cape Breton Island, Nova Scotia

== See also ==
- List of Marconi wireless stations, an article and list of Marconi wireless stations and sites
