= WCC (radio station) =

Locations of the Chatham and the Marion stations

WCC was the busiest coast station in the public ship-to-shore radio service for most of the 20th century. WCC was composed of two stations: the trans-oceanic receiver station (41°42′11″N 69°58′41″W) in South Chatham, Massachusetts and the trans-oceanic transmitter station forty miles to the west (41°42′54″N 70°46′20″W) in Marion, Massachusetts. Originally built by inventor Guglielmo Marconi in 1914, the Chatham and Marion stations were sold by Marconi Wireless Telegraph Company of America to the Radio Corporation of America in 1920. Most of the land used for the Marion Station became publicly accessible as part of the Sippican Lands Trust in 1986. The Chatham Station became the Chatham Marconi Maritime Center in 2002 and the surrounding land is preserved as the Forest Beach Conservation Area by the town of Chatham.

== Station history ==
In 1914, inventor Guglielmo Marconi sought a more permanent solution to his weather-induced radio station woes on Cape Cod. This need was made manifest by the damage and destruction wrought by nature at his original 1903 South Wellfleet location. The erosion and wind damage suffered by Marconi's first Cape Cod station continues to this day. Almost the entirety of the historic station is now long gone over the cliffs onto the beach and into the waters of the Atlantic below.

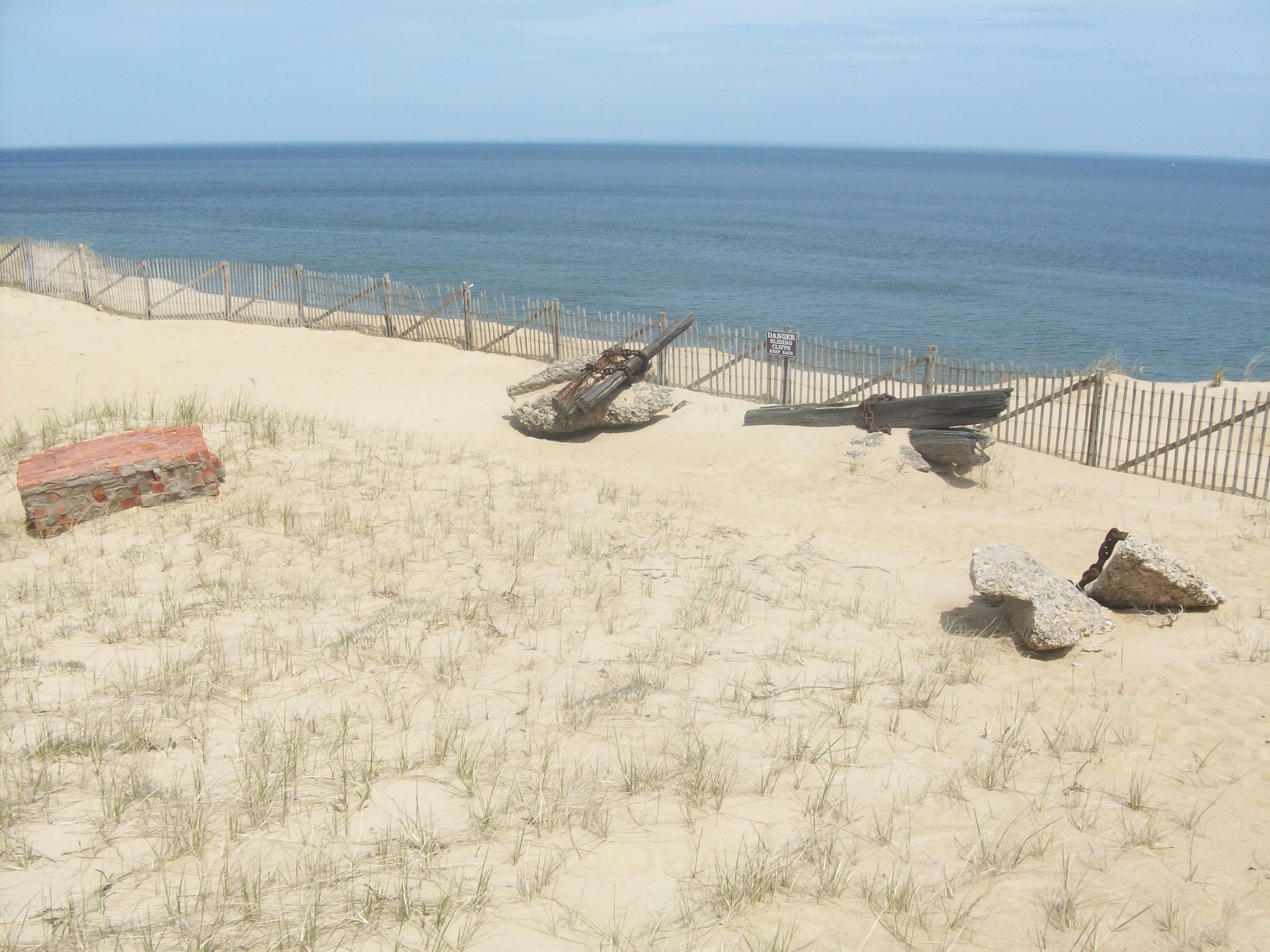
Remains of the South Wellfleet station's towers as they looked in April 2009

Marconi realized that a permanent presence would require a more inland and somewhat sheltered location. So it was that Marconi's Marconi Wireless Telegraph Company of America built his new trans-oceanic receiver station in Chatham and its companion high power trans-oceanic transmitter station forty miles to the west in Marion, Massachusetts through a contract with J.G. White Engineering Corp.

In 1920, the Marconi Wireless Telegraph Company of America sold the Chatham and Marion stations to the Radio Corporation of America. RCA removed all remaining Marconi equipment from the Chatham receiver station and converted it to a public coast station for communications with ships at sea. In 1921 Chatham was licensed under the callsign WCC for communications on 500 kHz, 750 kHz and 1 MHz. In 1922 RCA moved the WCC radio transmitters to the Marion transmitter station to eliminate co-site interference to the sensitive receivers at Chatham. In 1929 WCC Marion began operations on maritime HF frequencies (6, 8, 12, 16 and 22 MHz).

In 1948, the WCC marine radio transmitter equipment was moved from Marion Station to RCA's newly built oceanfront transmitter station on Forest Beach Road in South Chatham, Massachusetts. The U.S. Air Force continued to use the Alexanderson alternator at Marion Station for weather and other broadcasts to its air base in Thule, Greenland and other arctic locations through 1957 under the callsign AFA2.

In 1951, RCA sold Marion Station to the U.S. Government and the U.S General Services Administration sold it to a private investor in 1960. Most of the 143 acres that comprised the Marion Station was donated to the Sippican Lands Trust in 1986 and is publicly accessible. Radio Tower Property

In 1988, RCA Global Communications sold the WCC stations to Western Union International, a subsidiary of MCI Communications, as part of the breakup of RCA. In 1993 WCC became a remotely controlled station, using fiber optic cable to receive signals, transmit signals and issue such commands such as selecting and rotating directional antennas. Even the keying of Morse Code (CW) and Radioteletype (RTTY) was issued remotely at this early date in the public internet's infancy. WCC was operated from KPH Radio in Point Reyes, California until its closing.

In 1999, MCI/Worldcom sold the WCC receiver station in Chatham and the transmitter station on Forest Beach Road in South Chatham — nearly 100 acres in total — to the town of Chatham for a fraction of their value.

The Chatham receiver station is now the Chatham Marconi Maritime Center, and the home of amateur radio station WA1WCC, licensed to the WCC Amateur Radio Association. The South Chatham transmitter station is now preserved in its entirely as the Forest Beach Conservation Area by the town of Chatham.

The callsign WCC is now used by Globe Wireless by a Maryland station it operates to transmit automated e-mail-by-radio.

Chatham station was the subject of the Mooncusser Films documentary Chatham Radio: WCC the Untold Story, narrated by Walter Cronkite and directed by Christopher Seufert.

== Historic contacts ==
- 1928: communication with Richard E. Byrd's first South Pole expedition
- 1929: communication with the Graf Zeppelin during world's first around-the-world trip by air
- 1933: sends weather information to Charles Lindbergh
- 1937: possible last communication with the Hindenburg prior to explosion
- 1961: communication with Santa Maria (callsign CSAL) during hijacking

== See also ==
- Marconi Wireless Station Site (South Wellfleet, Massachusetts) — first station site, at Cape Cod National Seashore
- Marconi-RCA Wireless Receiving Station — Chatham station site
  - Chatham Marconi Maritime Center — the museum now at the Chatham station site
- Coast radio station
- KPH (radio)
- Marconi station (general list)
