= Marconi-RCA Bolinas Transmitting Station =

- U.S. National Register of Historic Places
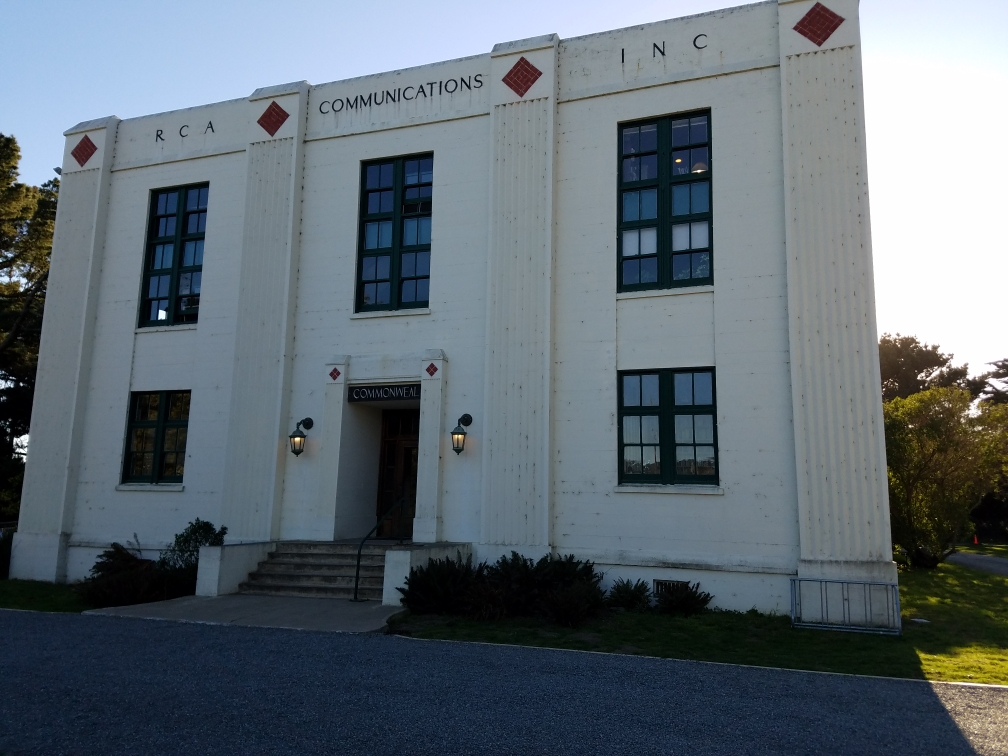

- Location within California
- Location: Mesa Road, Bolinas, California, United States
- Coordinates: 37°54′47″N 122°43′40″W
- Built: 1914
- Built by: Guglielmo Marconi
- NRHP reference No.: 100002108
- Added to NRHP: February 23, 2018

The Marconi-RCA Bolinas Transmitting Station, on Mesa Road in Bolinas, Marin County, California, was listed on the National Register of Historic Places in 2018.

The station was built in 1914 by Guglielmo Marconi (1874–1937) and taken over by RCA after World War I. It is one of six Point Reyes sites listed on the National Register in 2018. The station is recognized as a cultural landscape-type resource.

It was photographed by Jet Lowe and listed as "Marconi Radio Sites, Transmitting, Point Reyes Station, Marin County, CA," in the Historic American Engineering Record.

== See also ==
- Station KPH, Marconi Wireless Telegraph Company of America, Marshall, California
- Marconi–RCA Wireless Receiving Station, Chatham, Massachusetts
