= Call sign =

Unique designation for a transmitting station

In broadcasting and radio communications, a call sign (also known as a call name or call letters—and historically as a call signal—or abbreviated as a call) is a unique identifier for a transmitter station. A call sign can be formally assigned by a government agency, informally adopted by individuals or organizations, or even cryptographically encoded to disguise a station's identity.

The use of call signs as unique identifiers dates to the landline railroad telegraph system. Because there was only one telegraph line linking all railroad stations, there needed to be a way to address each one when sending a telegram. In order to save time, two-letter identifiers were adopted for this purpose. This pattern continued in radiotelegraph operation; radio companies initially assigned two-letter identifiers to coastal stations and stations on board ships at sea. These were not globally unique, so a one-letter company identifier (for instance, 'M' and two letters as a Marconi station) was later added. By 1912, the need to quickly identify stations operated by multiple companies in multiple nations required an international standard; an ITU prefix would be used to identify a country, and the rest of the call sign an individual station in that country.

== Transportation ==
=== Maritime ===
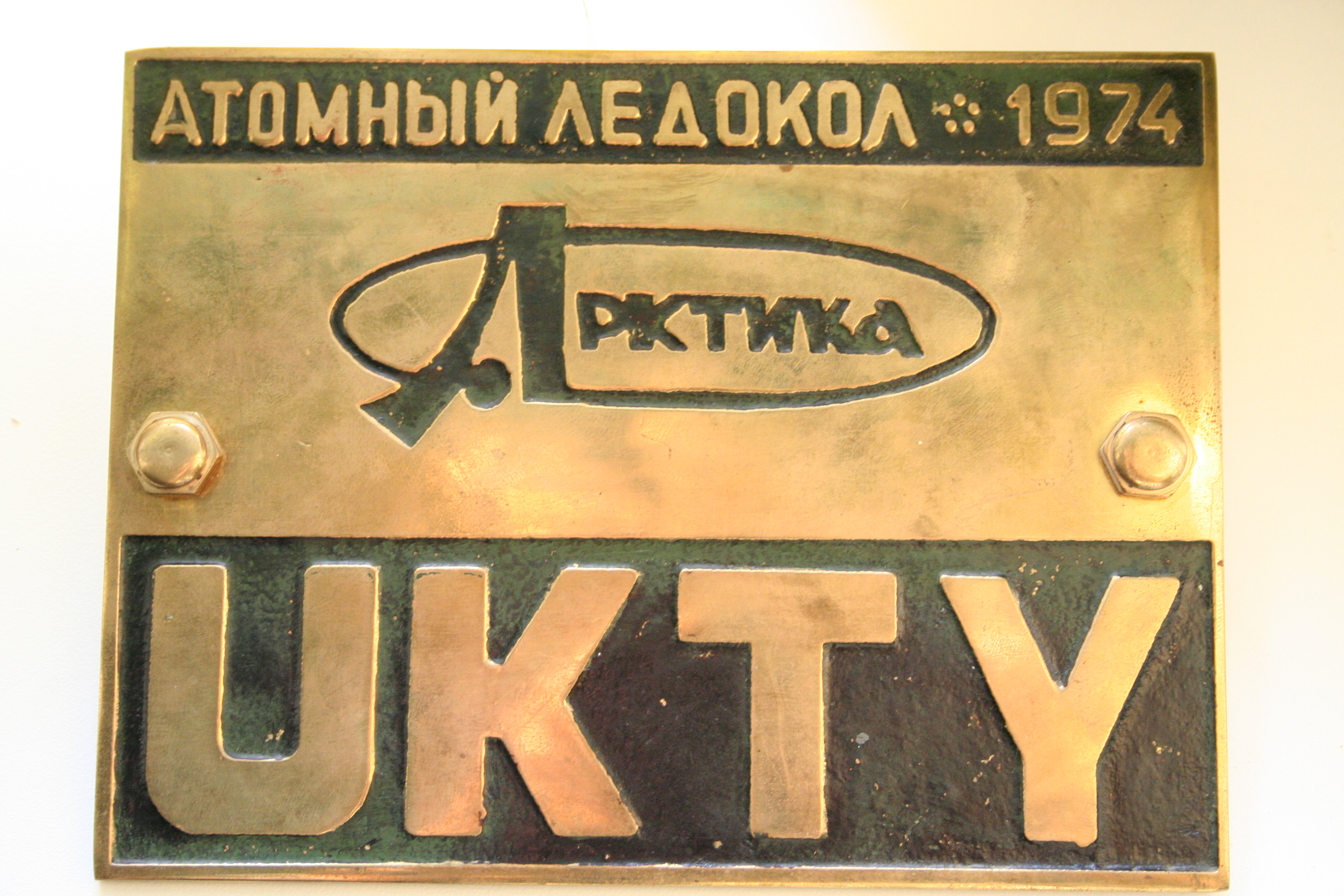
Russian nuclear icebreaker Arktika with call sign UKTY

Merchant and naval vessels are assigned call signs by their national licensing authorities. In the case of states such as Liberia or Panama, which are flags of convenience for ship registration, call signs for larger vessels consist of the national prefix plus three letters (for example, 3LXY, and sometimes followed by a number, e.g. 3LXY2). United States merchant vessels are given call signs beginning with the letters "W" or "K" while US naval ships are assigned call signs beginning with "N". Originally, both ships and broadcast stations were assigned call signs in this series consisting of three or four letters. Ships equipped with Morse code radiotelegraphy, or life boat radio sets, aviation ground stations, broadcast stations were given four-letter call signs. Maritime coast stations on high frequency (both radiotelegraphy and radiotelephony) were assigned three-letter call signs. As demand for both marine radio and broadcast call signs grew, gradually American-flagged vessels with radiotelephony only were given longer call signs with mixed letters and numbers.

Leisure craft with VHF radios may not be assigned call signs, in which case the name of the vessel is used instead. Ships in the US still wishing to have a radio license are under FCC class SA: "Ship recreational or voluntarily equipped." Those calls follow the land mobile format of the initial letter K or W followed by one or two letters followed by three or four numbers (such as KX0983 or WXX0029). U.S. Coast Guard small boats have a number that is shown on both bows (i.e. port and starboard) in which the first two digits indicate the nominal length of the boat in feet. For example, Coast Guard 47021 refers to the 21st in the series of 47-foot motor lifeboats. The call sign might be abbreviated to the final two or three numbers during operations, for example: Coast Guard zero two one.

=== Aviation ===
Originally aviation mobile stations (aircraft) equipped with radiotelegraphy were assigned five-letter call signs (e.g. KHAAQ). Land stations in aviation were assigned four-letter call signs (e.g. WEAL – Eastern Air Lines, NYC.) These call signs were phased out in the 1960s when flight radio officers (FRO) were no longer required on international flights. The Russian Federation kept FROs for the Moscow-Havana run until around 2000.

Currently, all signs in aviation are derived from several different policies, depending upon the type of flight operation and whether or not the caller is in an aircraft or at a ground facility. In most countries, unscheduled general aviation flights identify themselves using the call sign corresponding to the aircraft's registration number (also called N-number in the U.S., or tail number). In this case, the call sign is spoken using the International Civil Aviation Organization (ICAO) phonetic alphabet. Aircraft registration numbers internationally follow the pattern of a country prefix, followed by a unique identifier made up of letters and numbers. For example, an aircraft registered as N978CP conducting a general aviation flight would use the call sign November-niner-seven-eight-Charlie-Papa. However, in the United States a pilot of an aircraft would normally omit saying November, and instead use the name of the aircraft manufacturer or the specific model. At times, general aviation pilots might omit additional preceding numbers and use only the last three numbers and letters. This is especially true at uncontrolled fields (those without control towers) when reporting traffic pattern positions or at towered airports after establishing two-way communication with the tower controller. For example, Skyhawk eight-Charlie-Papa, left base. In commercial aviation, the callsign is usually the ICAO Flight number. For example, Delta Air Lines Flight 744 would have the flight number DL744 and the callsign would be Delta 744.

In most countries, the aircraft call sign or "tail number"/"tail letters" (also known as registration marks) are linked to the international radio call sign allocation table and follow a convention that aircraft radio stations (and, by extension, the aircraft itself) receive call signs consisting of five letters. For example, all British civil aircraft have a five-letter registration beginning with the letter G, which can also serve for a call sign. Canadian aircraft have a call sign beginning with C–F or C–G, such as C–FABC. wing-in-ground-effect vehicles and hovercraft in Canada are eligible to receive C–Hxxx call signs, and ultralight aircraft receive C-Ixxx call signs. In days gone by, even American aircraft used five-letter call signs, such as KH–ABC, but they were replaced prior to World War II by the current American system of civilian aircraft call signs (see below). One exception to the parallelism between registration and call sign is ultralight airplanes in France, who are not obliged to carry a radio and indeed often don't.

=== Spaceflight ===
Radio call signs used for communication in crewed spaceflight are not formalized or regulated to the same degree as for aircraft. The three nations currently launching crewed space missions use different methods to identify the ground and space radio stations; the United States uses either the names given to the space vehicles, or else the project name and mission number. Russia traditionally assigns code names as call signs to individual cosmonauts, more in the manner of aviator call signs, rather than to the spacecraft.

The only continuity in call signs for spacecraft have been the issuance of "ISS"-suffixed call signs by various countries in the amateur radio service as a citizen of their country has been assigned there. The first amateur radio call sign assigned to the International Space Station was NA1SS by the United States. OR4ISS (Belgium), DP0ISS (Germany), and RS0ISS (Russia) are examples of others, but are not all-inclusive of others also issued.

== Broadcasting ==
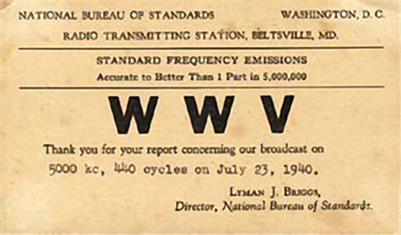
A 1940 QSL card for WWV, indicating its early location in the U.S. state of Maryland

Broadcasters are allocated call signs in many countries. While broadcast radio stations will often brand themselves with plain-text names, identities such as "Cool FM", "Rock 105" or "the ABC network" are not globally unique. Another station in another city or country may (and often will) have a similar brand, and the name of a broadcast station for legal purposes is normally its internationally recognized ITU call sign. Some common conventions are followed in each country.

Broadcast stations in North America generally use call signs in the international series. In the United States of America, they are used for all FCC-licensed transmitters. The first letter generally is K for stations located west of the Mississippi River and W for eastern stations. Historic exceptions in the east include KYW in Philadelphia and KDKA in Pittsburgh, while western exceptions include WJAG in Norfolk, Nebraska, and WOAI in San Antonio. All new call signs have been four-character for some decades, though there are historical three-character call letters still in use today, such as KSL in Salt Lake City; KOA in Denver; WHO in Des Moines; WWJ and WJR in Detroit; WJZ-TV in Baltimore; WJW-TV in Cleveland; WBT in Charlotte; WBZ in Boston; WSM in Nashville; WGY in Schenectady; WRC-TV in Washington, D.C.; WGR in Buffalo; KFI; KGW-TV in Portland; KNX and KHJ in Los Angeles; and WGN, WLS and WLS-TV in Chicago. American radio stations announce their call signs (except for rare cases in which would interfere with the broadcast of very long works of classical or opera music) at or near the top of each hour, as well as sign-on and sign-off for stations that do not broadcast 24 hours. Beginning in the early 2000s, digital subchannels were assigned a -DT# suffix, where # is the subchannel (starting with the number 2).

In Canada, the publicly owned Canadian Broadcasting Corporation uses the prefix CB; privately owned commercial broadcast stations use primarily CF and CH through CK prefixes; and four stations licensed to St. John's by the Dominion of Newfoundland government retain their original VO calls. In Mexico, AM radio stations use XE call signs (such as XEW-AM), while the majority of FM radio and television stations use XH. Broadcast call signs are normally four or five alpha characters in length, plus the -FM, -TV, or -TDT suffix where applicable.

In South America call signs have been a traditional way of identifying radio and TV stations. Some stations still broadcast their call signs a few times a day, but this practice is becoming very rare. Argentinian broadcast call signs consist of two or three letters followed by multiple numbers, the second and third letters indicating region. In Brazil, radio and TV stations are identified by a ZY, a third letter and three numbers. ZYA and ZYB are allocated to television stations; ZYI, ZYJ, ZYL, and ZYK designate AM stations; ZYG is used for shortwave stations; ZYC, ZYD, ZYM, and ZYU are given to FM stations.

In Australia, broadcast call signs are optional, but are allocated by the Australian Communications and Media Authority and are unique for each broadcast station.

Most European and Asian countries do not use call signs to identify broadcast stations, but Japan, South Korea, Indonesia, the Philippines and Taiwan do have call sign systems. Spanish broadcasters used call signs consisting of E followed by two letters and up to three digits until the late 1970s. Portugal had a similar system, their callsigns beginning with C; these also ceased to be used in the 1970s. Britain has no call signs in the American sense, but allows broadcast stations to choose their own trade mark call sign up to six words in length.

== Amateur radio ==
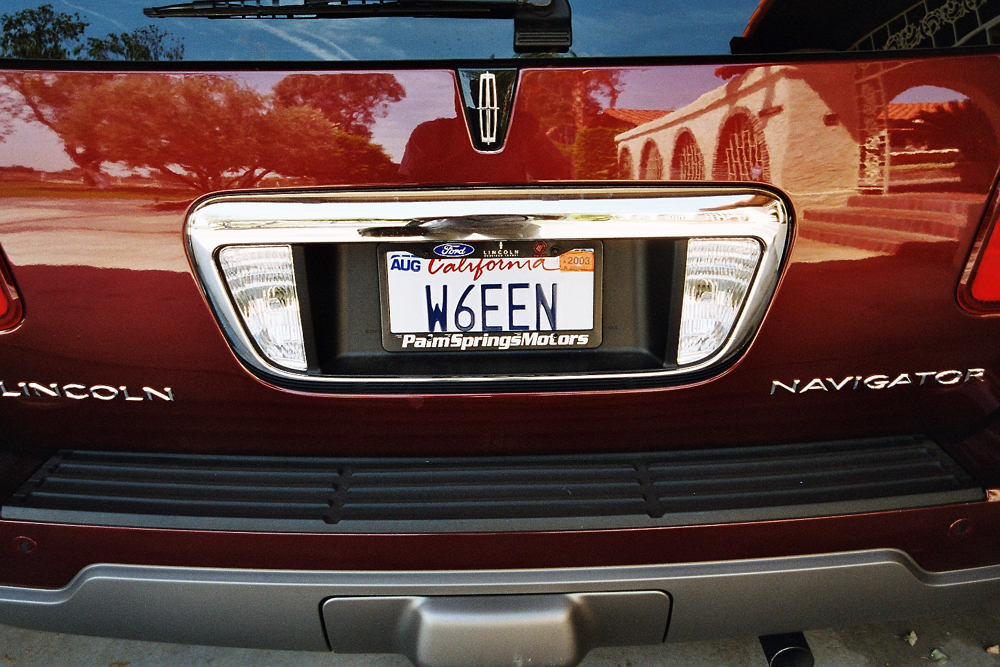
All U.S. states issue call sign license plates upon request for motor vehicles owned by amateur radio operators; this road vehicle is from California.

Amateur radio call signs are in the international series and normally consist of a one or two character prefix, a digit (which may be used to denote a geographical area, class of license, or identify a licensee as a visitor or temporary resident), and a 1-, 2-, or 3-letter suffix. In Australia, call signs are structured with a two letter prefix, a digit (which identifies geographical area), and a 2, 3 or 4 letter suffix. This suffix may be followed by a further suffix, or personal identifier, such as /P (portable), /M (mobile), /AM (aeronautical mobile) or /MM (maritime mobile). The number following the prefix is normally a single number (0 to 9). Some prefixes, such as Djibouti's (J2), consist of a letter followed by a number. Hence, in the hypothetical Djibouti call sign, J29DBA, the prefix is J2, the number is 9, and the suffix is DBA. Others may start with a number followed by a letter, for example, Jamaican call signs begin with 6Y.

When operating with reciprocal agreements under the jurisdiction of a foreign government, an identifying station pre-pends the call sign with the country prefix and number of the country/territory from which the operation is occurring. For example, W4/G3ABC would denote a licensed amateur from the United Kingdom who is operating in the fourth district of the United States. There are exceptions; in the case of U.S./Canadian reciprocal operations, the country/territory identifier is, instead, appended to the call sign; e.g., W1AW/VE4, or VE3XYZ/W1.

Special call signs are issued in the amateur radio service either for special purposes, VIPs, or for temporary use to commemorate special events. Examples include VO1S (VO1 as a Dominion of Newfoundland call sign prefix, S to commemorate Marconi's first trans-Atlantic message, a single-character Morse code S sent from Cornwall, England to Signal Hill, St. John's in 1901) and GB90MGY (GB as a Great Britain call sign prefix, 90 and MGY to commemorate the 90th anniversary of historic 1912 radio distress calls from MGY, the Marconi station aboard the famed White Star luxury liner RMS Titanic).

The late King Hussein of Jordan was issued a special amateur license number, JY1, which would have been the shortest possible call sign issued by the Hashemite Kingdom of Jordan.

When identifying a station by voice, the call sign may be given by simply stating the letters and numbers, or using a phonetic alphabet. Some countries mandate the use of the phonetic alphabet for identification.

== Military call signs ==
In wartime, monitoring an adversary's communications can be a valuable form of intelligence. Consistent call signs can aid in this monitoring, so in wartime, military units often employ tactical call signs and sometimes change them at regular intervals. In peacetime, some military stations will use fixed call signs in the international series.

The United States Army uses fixed station call signs which begin with W, such as WAR, used by U.S. Army Headquarters. Fixed call signs for the United States Air Force stations begin with A, such as AIR, used by USAF Headquarters. The United States Navy, United States Marine Corps, and United States Coast Guard use a mixture of tactical call signs and international call signs beginning with the letter N. U.S. Navy and Coast Guard vessels typically fly their call sign using maritime signal flags from the inboard port signal halyard when entering or leaving port.

In the British military, tactical voice communications use a system of call signs of the form letter-digit-digit. Within a standard infantry battalion, these characters represent companies, platoons and sections respectively, so that 3 Section, 1 Platoon of F Company might be F13. In addition, a suffix following the initial call sign can denote a specific individual or grouping within the designated call sign, so F13C would be the Charlie fire team. Unused suffixes can be used for other call signs that do not fall into the standard call sign matrix, for example the unused 33A call sign is used to refer to the company sergeant major.

== Transmitters requiring no call signs ==
No call signs are issued to transmitters of the long-range navigation systems (Decca, Alpha, Omega), or transmitters on frequencies below 10 kHz, because frequencies below 10 kHz are not subject to international regulations. In addition, in some countries lawful unlicensed low-power personal and broadcast radio signals (Citizen's Band ("CB"), Part 15 or ISM bands) are permitted; an international call sign is not issued to such stations due to their unlicensed nature. Also, wireless network routers or mobile devices and computers using Wi-Fi are unlicensed and do not have call signs. On some personal radio services, such as CB, it is considered a matter of etiquette to create one's own call sign, which is called a handle (or trail name). Some wireless networking protocols also allow SSIDs or MAC addresses to be set as identifiers, but with no guarantee that this label will remain unique. Many mobile telephony systems identify base transceiver stations by implementing cell ID and mobile stations (e.g., phones) by requiring them to authenticate using international mobile subscriber identity (IMSI).

International regulations no longer require a call sign for broadcast stations; however, they are still required for broadcasters in many countries, including the United States. Mobile phone services do not use call signs on-air because the phones and their users are not licensed, instead the cell operator is the one holding the license. However, the U.S. still assigns a call sign to each mobile-phone spectrum license.

In the United States, voluntary ships operating domestically are not required to have a call sign or license to operate VHF radios, radar or an EPIRB. Voluntary ships (mostly pleasure and recreational) are not required to have a radio. However, ships which are required to have radio equipment (most large commercial vessels) are issued a call sign.

== Callbooks ==
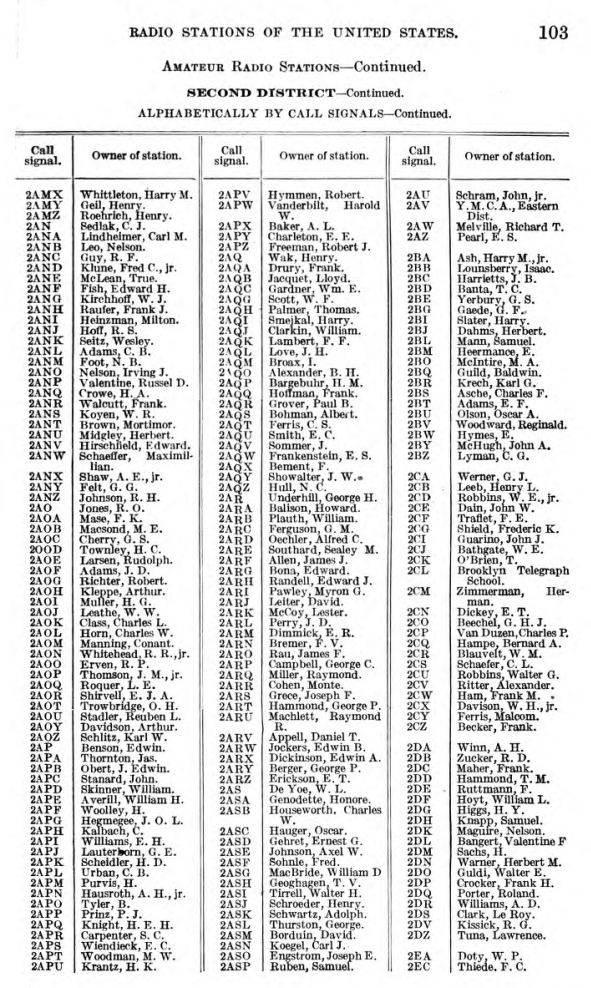
Department of Commerce callbook, 1919

A directory of radio station call signs is called a callbook. Callbooks were originally bound books that resembled a telephone directory and contained the name and addressees of licensed radio stations in a given jurisdiction (country). Modern Electrics published the first callbook in the United States in 1909.

Today, the primary purpose of a callbook is to allow amateur radio operators to send a confirmation post card, called a QSL card to an operator with whom they have communicated via radio. Callbooks have evolved to include on-line databases that are accessible via the Internet to instantly obtain the address of another amateur radio operator and their QSL Managers. The most well known and used on-line QSL databases include QRZ.COM, IK3QAR, HamCall, F6CYV, DXInfo, OZ7C and QSLInfo.

== See also ==
- Brevity code
- Glossary of military abbreviations
- List of aviation, avionics, aerospace and aeronautical abbreviations
- List of aviation mnemonics
- List of government and military acronyms
- ITU prefix
- NATO phonetic alphabet
- Pan-pan
- Procedure word
- Pseudonym
- Tactical designator
