= Marconi–RCA Wireless Receiving Station =

- U.S. National Register of Historic Places
- U.S. Historic district
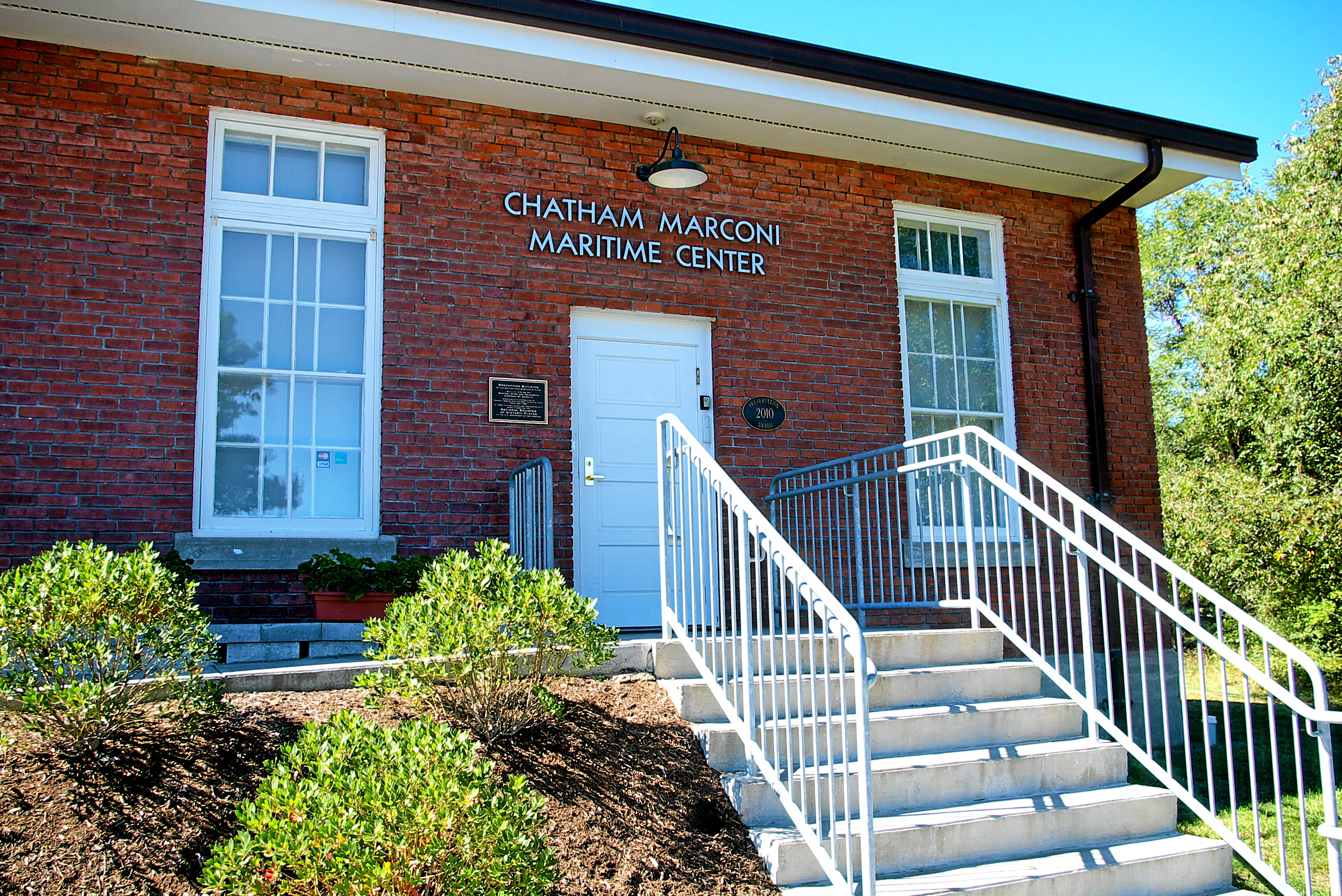

- Location within Cape Cod Location within Massachusetts Location within the United States
- Location: Chatham, Massachusetts
- Coordinates: 41°42′11″N 69°58′41″W
- Built: 1914
- Architectural style: Bungalow / Craftsman
- NRHP reference No.: 94000996
- Added to NRHP: August 30, 1994

The Marconi–RCA Wireless Receiving Station is a historic district at the junction of Old Comers Rd. and Orleans Rd. in Chatham, Massachusetts. It and its companion transmitter station at Marion were used for WCC, the busiest ship to shore radio station for most of the 20th century. The district includes eight red brick buildings constructed by Marconi in 1914 to house the station's operations; it was listed on the National Register of Historic Places in 1994, and is now home to the Chatham Marconi Maritime Center museum.

== Station history ==
In 1914, the Marconi Wireless Telegraph Company of America built a station in Chatham for the purpose of providing point to point radiotelegraphy service with a Marconi station in Stavanger, Norway. Contrary to common belief, the Chatham site was not built as a replacement to the failed Marconi station in Wellfleet. With the outbreak of World War I, the Marconi company was unable to complete construction of the Chatham station. Therefore, they never put the station into service.

In December 1919, the assets of the Marconi Wireless Telegraph Company of America were acquired by the Radio Corporation of America. Under RCA, the Chatham station entered point to point service in May of 1920, providing high speed radiotelegraphy to Norway, adding service to Germany in August of 1920. Chatham was the receiver site with the transmitters located in Marion Massachusetts.

In the spring of 1921, RCA switched point to point service to a new high-power station located at Rocky Point, Long Island NY. April of 1921, Chatham Radio began high seas radiotelegraph service and became the premier ship to shore station in the United States, serving mariners of the world for over 7 decades.

After WW II, a new transmitter facility was built at Forest Beach in South Chatham. It entered service in 1948, replacing the Marion transmitter site.

Due to the requirement that all ships have satellite service by the summer of 1997, the station closed in July of 1997.

The Marconi/RCA Wireless Museum in Chatham, MA. is located inside the original 1914 operating building. The museum covers early Marconi history, ship to shore radiotelegraphy, WW II naval intercept operations and preserves the history of historic Chatham Radio/WCC.

The South Chatham transmitter site is now preserved as open space.

== Historic contacts ==
- 1928: communication with Richard E. Byrd's first South Pole expedition
- 1929: communication with the Graf Zeppelin during world's first around-the-world trip by air
- 1933: sends weather information to Charles Lindbergh
- 1937: possible last communication with the Hindenburg prior to explosion
- 1961: communication with Santa Maria (callsign CSAL) during hijacking

== See also ==
- Cape Cod National Seashore
- Coast radio station
- KPH (radio)
