= South Wellfleet Marconi Station =

- Marconi Wireless Station Site
- U.S. National Register of Historic Places
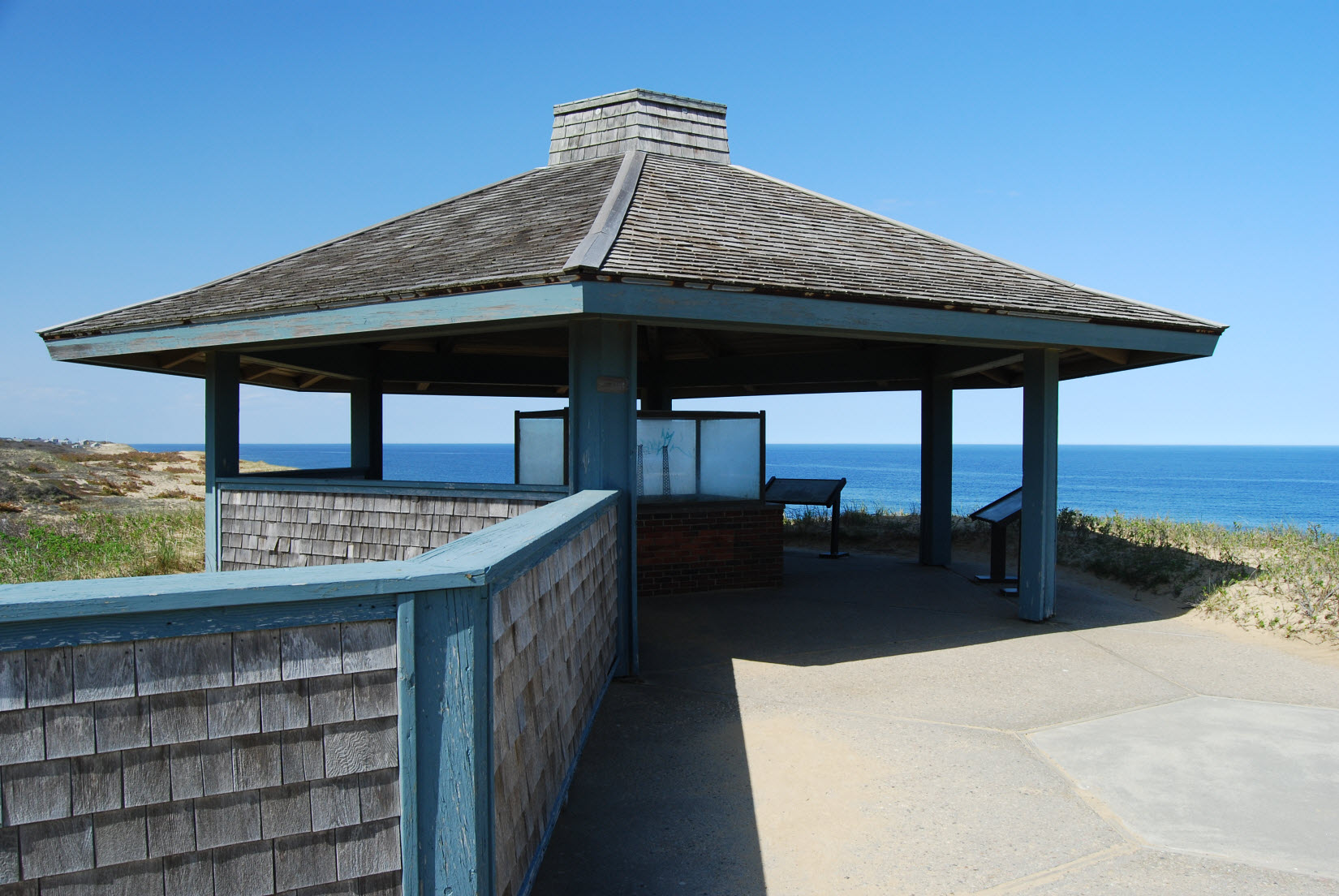
- Interpretive display pavilion at the site, April 2010

- Location within Cape Cod Location within Massachusetts Location within the United States
- Location: South Wellfleet, Massachusetts
- Coordinates: 41°54′50″N 69°58′16″W
- Built: 1901
- Architect: Carl Taylor
- NRHP reference No.: 75000158
- Added to NRHP: May 2, 1975

The Marconi Wireless Station Site in South Wellfleet, Massachusetts, USA is the site of the first transatlantic wireless communication between the United States of America and Europe, on January 18, 1903. At this location, now part of the Cape Cod National Seashore (though no admission is charged if not visiting Marconi Beach), inventor Guglielmo Marconi erected a large antenna array on four 210-foot (64 m) wooden towers, and established a transmitting station powered by kerosene engines that produced the 25,000 volts of electricity needed to send signals to a similar station in Poldhu, Cornwall, United Kingdom. The first transmission received on the continent of North America by Marconi was at Signal Hill, St. John's, Newfoundland and Labrador in 1901; Glace Bay, Nova Scotia was the site of the first such two-way transmission, in 1902.

One of the station's most notable roles occurred with the sinking of the RMS Titanic in April 1912. Operators at the station were able to alert the RMS Carpathia so that the rescue of some of the Titanic's passengers could be effected. The station was shut down in 1917 in part over concerns about its use in World War I, but also because its towers were threatened with erosion. In 1920, usable materials and equipment were removed from the site, and it was abandoned. Erosion has taken its toll over the years since then, and there was little left as of the date of the National Park Service brochure. No trace of the site remains as of September 2014; the sea has claimed it all.

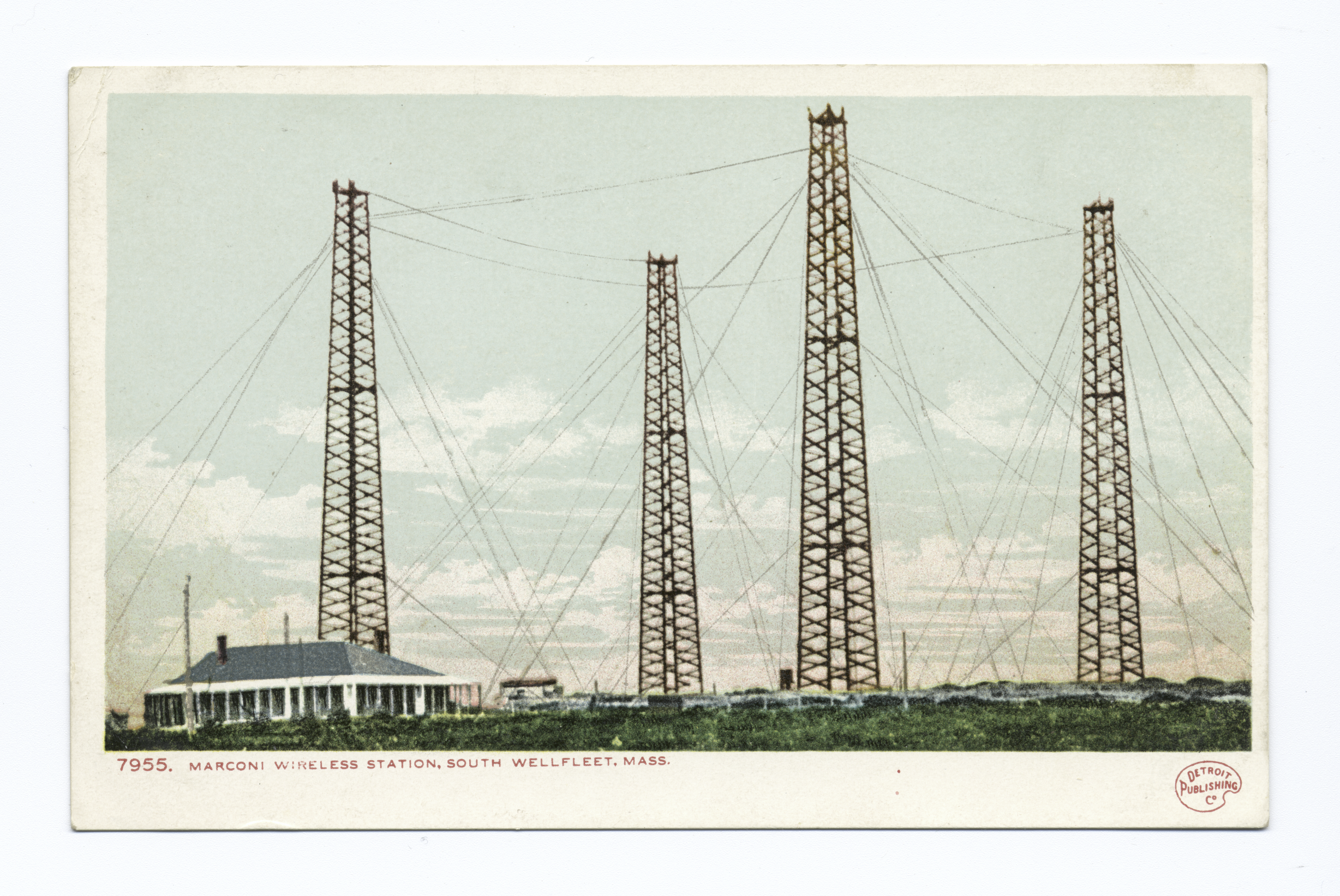
Working station, early 20th century postcard

The site was listed on the National Register of Historic Places in 1975.

== See also ==
- WCC (radio station)
- Marconi station (general list)
