= Marconi (surname) =

Marconi is surname and, more unfrequently, a given name. Notable people with the surname include:

- Al Marconi (born 1969), Spanish Guitar international performer
- Alfonso Marconi (1865–1936), Italian businessman and collector
- Andrea Marconi (born 1985) Italian footballer
- David Marconi, American screenwriter
- Dominic Anthony Marconi (born 1927), American Roman Catholic bishop
- Enrico Marconi, also known as Henryk Marconi (1792–1863), Italian architect
- Francesco Marconi (1853 or 1855–1916), Italian operatic tenor
- Gaudenzio Marconi (1841–1885), Italian photographer
- Gioia Marconi Braga (1916−1996), daughter of Guglielmo Marconi, founder and chairwoman of the Marconi Foundation
- Gloria Marconi (born 1968), Italian long-distance runner
- Guglielmo Marconi (1874–1937), Italian electrical engineer and inventor of radio
- Ivan Marconi (born 1989), Italian footballer
- Juan Martínez Marconi (born 1982), Chilean footballer
- Joe Marconi (1934–1992), American football fullback
- Jole Bovio Marconi (1897-1986), Italian archaeologist
- Juan Martínez Marconi (born 1982), Chilean footballer
- Lana Marconi (1917–1990), Romanian-French actress
- Leandro Marconi (1834–1919), architect, son of Enrico Marconi
- Leonard Marconi (1835–1899), Polish and Austro-Hungarian architect and sculptor
- Lou Marconi (born 1973), American professional wrestler, trainer, and occasional actor
- Luca Marconi (born 1989), Italian motorcycle racer
- Maria Marconi (born 1984), Italian diver
- Michele Marconi (born 1989), Italian footballer
- Nazzareno Marconi (born 1958), Roman Catholic bishop of Macerata and Recanati
- Nicola Marconi (born 1978), Italian diver
- Rocco Marconi (before 1490–1529), Italian painter
- Saverio Marconi (born 1948), former Italian actor and stage director
- Tommaso Marconi (born 1982), Italian diver
- Władysław Marconi (1848-1915), Polish architect

Notable people with the given name Marconi include

- Marconi Ferreira Perillo Júnior (born 1963), Brazilian politician
- Marconi Ribeiro Souza (born 1988), Brazilian footballer
- Marconi Turay (born 1949), Sierra Leonean athlete
