= Marconia (disambiguation) =

Marconia is a town in the region of Basilicata, Italy.

Marconia may also refer to:

- 1332 Marconia, a dark asteroid and the parent body of the Marconia family
  - Marconia family
- Marconia (gastropod)
- Marconia, a U.S. fishing vessel shipwrecked in 1962

== See also ==
- Marconi (disambiguation)
