= Juan Martínez (Chilean footballer) =

Chilean footballer (born 1982)

Personal information
- Full name: Juan Martínez Marconi
- Date of birth: 1 May 1982 (age 44)
- Place of birth: Santiago, Chile
- Height: 1.89 m (6 ft 2 in)
- Position: Goalkeeper

Youth career
- Universidad Católica
- 1999–2001: Rangers

Senior career*
Years	Team	Apps	(Gls)
2002–2009	Rangers	78	(0)
2003	→ Los Cóndores (loan)	–	(–)
2005	→ Deportes Linares (loan)	32	(0)
2010–2011	Unión Temuco	41	(0)
2012	Lota Schwager	34	(0)
2013–2015	Curicó Unido	20	(0)
2015–2016	Deportes Temuco	1	(0)
Total		206	(0)
- * Club domestic league appearances and goals

Juan Antonio Martínez Marconi (born 1 May 1982), known as Juan Martínez, is a Chilean former professional footballer who played as a goalkeeper.

== Career ==
A product of Universidad Católica youth system, Marconi switched to Rangers de Talca and made his professional debut with them in 2002.

He also played for Los Cóndores from Colbún, Deportes Linares, Unión Temuco, Lota Schwager, Curicó Unido and Deportes Temuco, his last club in the Primera B.

== Personal life ==
His father of the same name, Juan Martínez Ortiz, nicknamed Mono (Monkey), was a goalkeeper for clubs such as Curicó Unido and Deportes Temuco in the 1980s.

Following his retirement, Martínez continued playing football for amateur clubs like Atlético Curicó Unido. In 2024, he started a career as a game announcer for amateur matches.
