= Marconi Beach =

Beach in Massachusetts, United States

Coordinates: 41.892°N 69.962°W

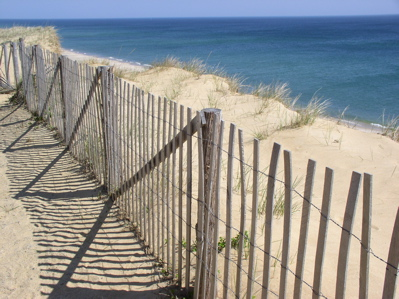
Marconi Beach

Marconi Beach is part of the Cape Cod National Seashore in Wellfleet, Massachusetts. The beach is named for Italian inventor Guglielmo Marconi. In 1903, the first transatlantic wireless communication originating in the United States was successfully transmitted from nearby Marconi Station; a message from U.S. President Theodore Roosevelt to King Edward VII of the United Kingdom. The beach was also used by the former Camp Wellfleet for artillery and rocket testing.

View facing north with the steep sand cliff on the left

View facing south with the steep sand cliff on the right

There is a broad, sweeping view of the Atlantic Ocean and Cape Cod Bay from the overlook atop the steep sand cliff above the beach. The National Park Service has built a display on-site that describes the history of wireless telegraphy, though parts have been removed due to beach erosion. During the summer season, restrooms and outdoor showers are available to beachgoers, along with on-site parking and access from the nearby bike trail via a two-lane road. Admission is charged for vehicles and pedestrians at the rate for all Cape Cod National Seashore beaches.

Marconi Beach is popular among locals and tourists for surfing and boogie boarding. It is one of five Cape Cod national seashore beaches that are on the ocean side of the Cape, generally providing a better surf than beaches on the bay side. Low tide exposes a fairly flat stretch of beach, making it also popular for skimboarding.

Grey seals can often be seen in the waters at Marconi, frequently confounding the efforts of surfcasters to land the bluefish and striped bass cruising beyond the breakers during the summer and fall.

At nighttime, the park is Bortle Scale Class 3, making it a popular stargazing site for those in Eastern Massachusetts.
