= Coast radio station =

On-shore maritime radio station

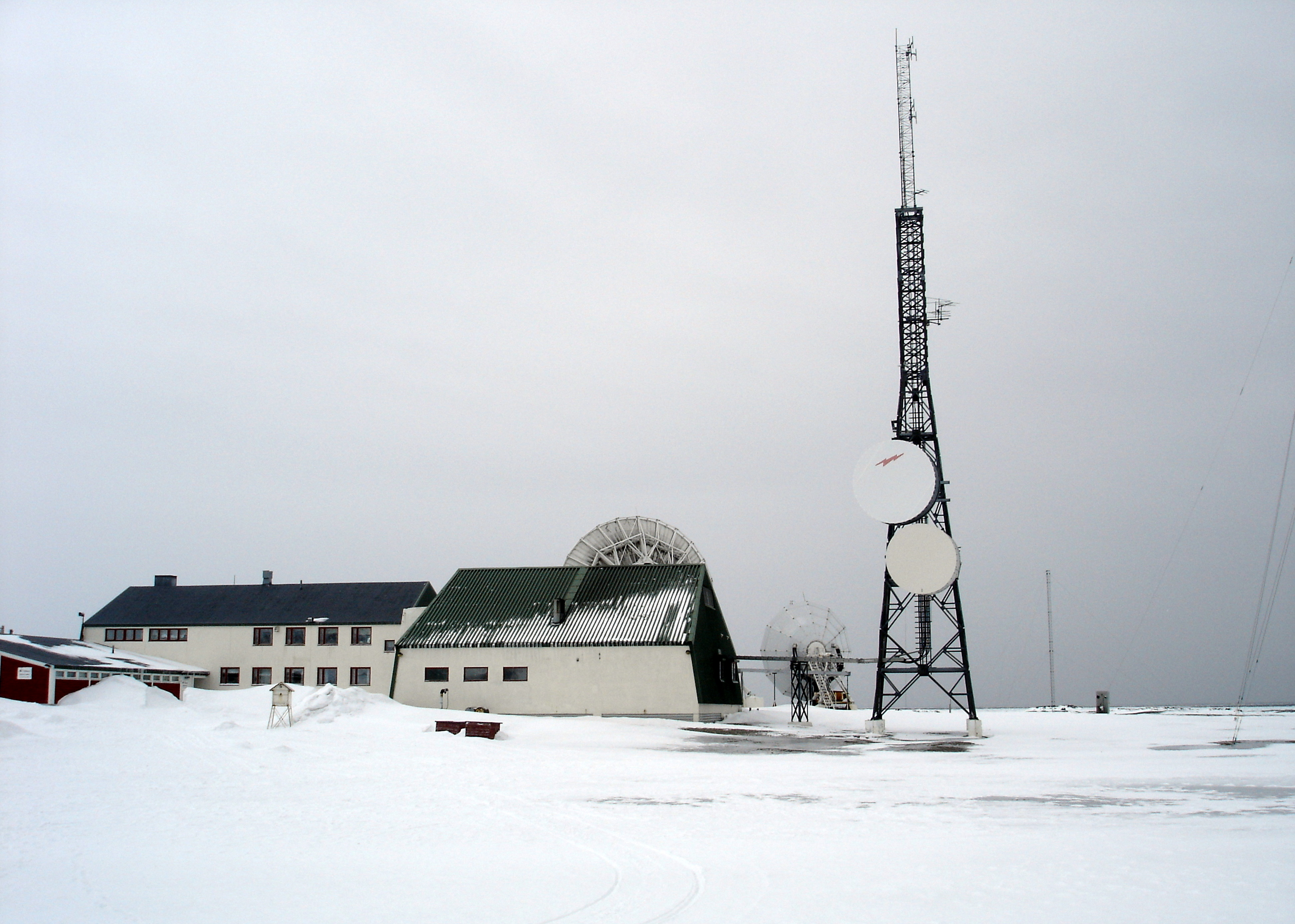
Isfjord Radio, 2007

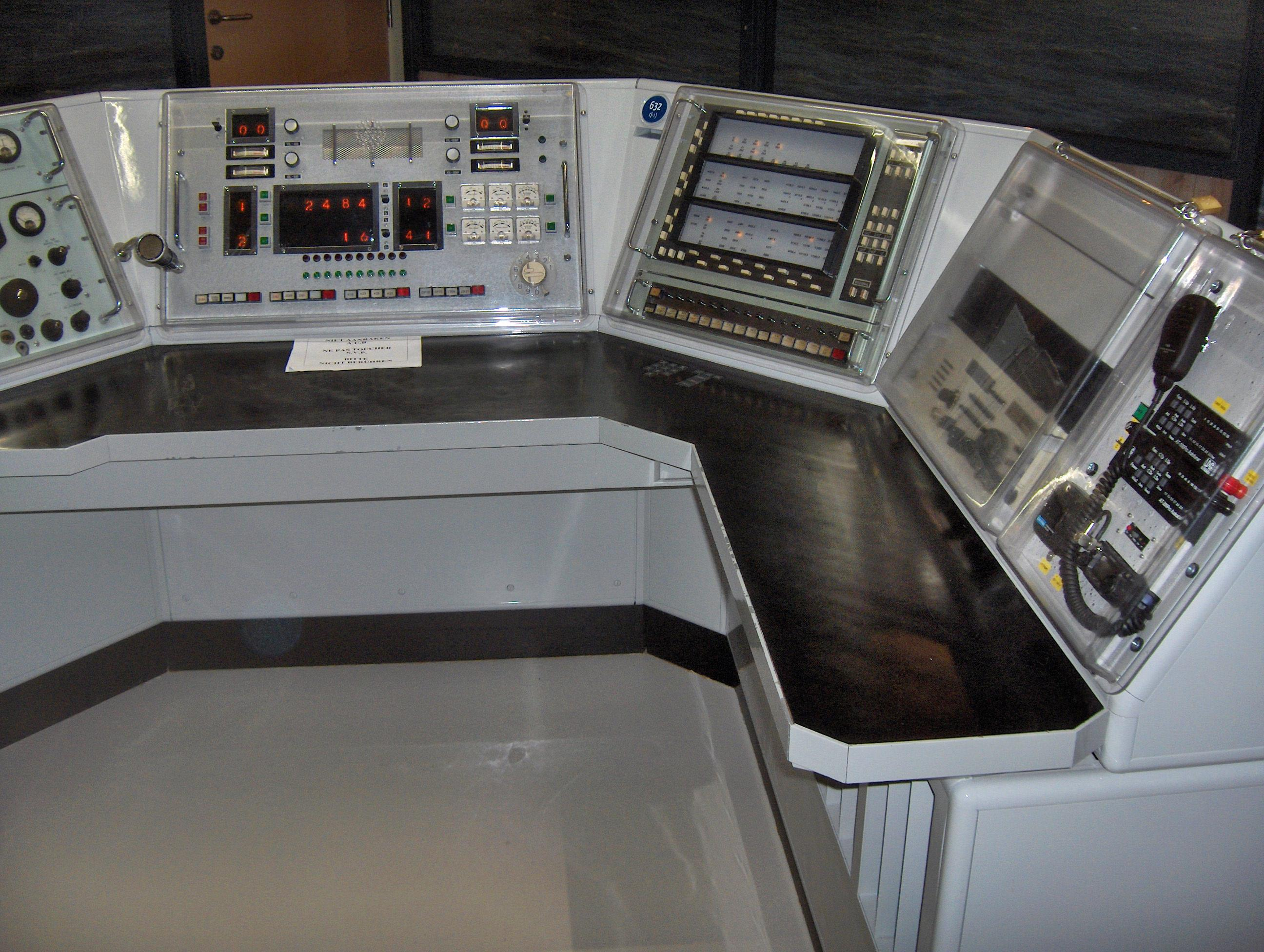
Former Belgium coast station, exposed in the National fishing-museum in Koksijde

A coast (or coastal) radio station (short: coast station) is an onshore maritime radio station which monitors radio distress frequencies and relays ship-to-ship and ship-to-land communications.

A coast station (also: coast radio station ) is – according to article 1.75 of the International Telecommunication Union's (ITU) ITU Radio Regulations (RR) – defined as «A land station in the maritime mobile service.»

Coast Radio Station had an important role in the history of wireless radio communication as well as in maritime and war history.

Recent coastal radio station provides medical advice services for ships, transmitting meteo messages and navigational warnings (NAV-Notice) on a regular base and all of them do a distress channel watch (DSC-Watch) on VHF Channel 16. Not all stations monitor 2.182 MHz shortwave anymore.

== Coast radio stations ==
Name	Callsign	Location	Operator	Period of activity
Kystradio Radio		Bodø, Norway.	Telenor Maritim Radio,	1938 - ongoing
Scheveningen Radio	PCH	Scheveningen, Netherlands	PTT	1904-1999
Navy Coast Station Marlow	DHO26	Marlow, Rostock, Germany	German Navy	1990 - ongoing
Bern Radio	HEB	Bern, Switzerland	Swisscom Broadcast AG	1941-2016
PNS Hameed		Karachi, Sindh, Pakistan	Pakistan Navy	2016 - ongoing
Isfjord Radio		Kapp Linné, Spitsbergen, Svalbard, Norway	Norwegian Polar Institute	1933 - ongoing
Norddeich Radio	DAN	Osterlood, Norden, Germany	German Telekom	1907-1998
KPH	KPH	Inverness, California, USA	RCA	1930-1998
WCC	WCC	Originally Cape Cod, USA	RCA, Western Union	1903-1997
Shanghai Radio	XSG XSG21	Shanghai, PR China		ongoing
Taupo Maritime Radio	ZLM	Lake Taupō (tx), Lower Hutt (HQ), New Zealand	Maretime New Zealand	ongoing

== See also ==
- Marconi Station
- Utility station
- KPH - A preserved RCA coastal wireless station in California
- WCC - A former coastal wireless station on Cape Cod, now operating from Maryland
- Portishead Radio - former UK station

== References / sources ==
- International Telecommunication Union (ITU)
