= Chatham Marconi Maritime Center =

Coordinates: 41°42′12.66″N 69°58′48.96″W

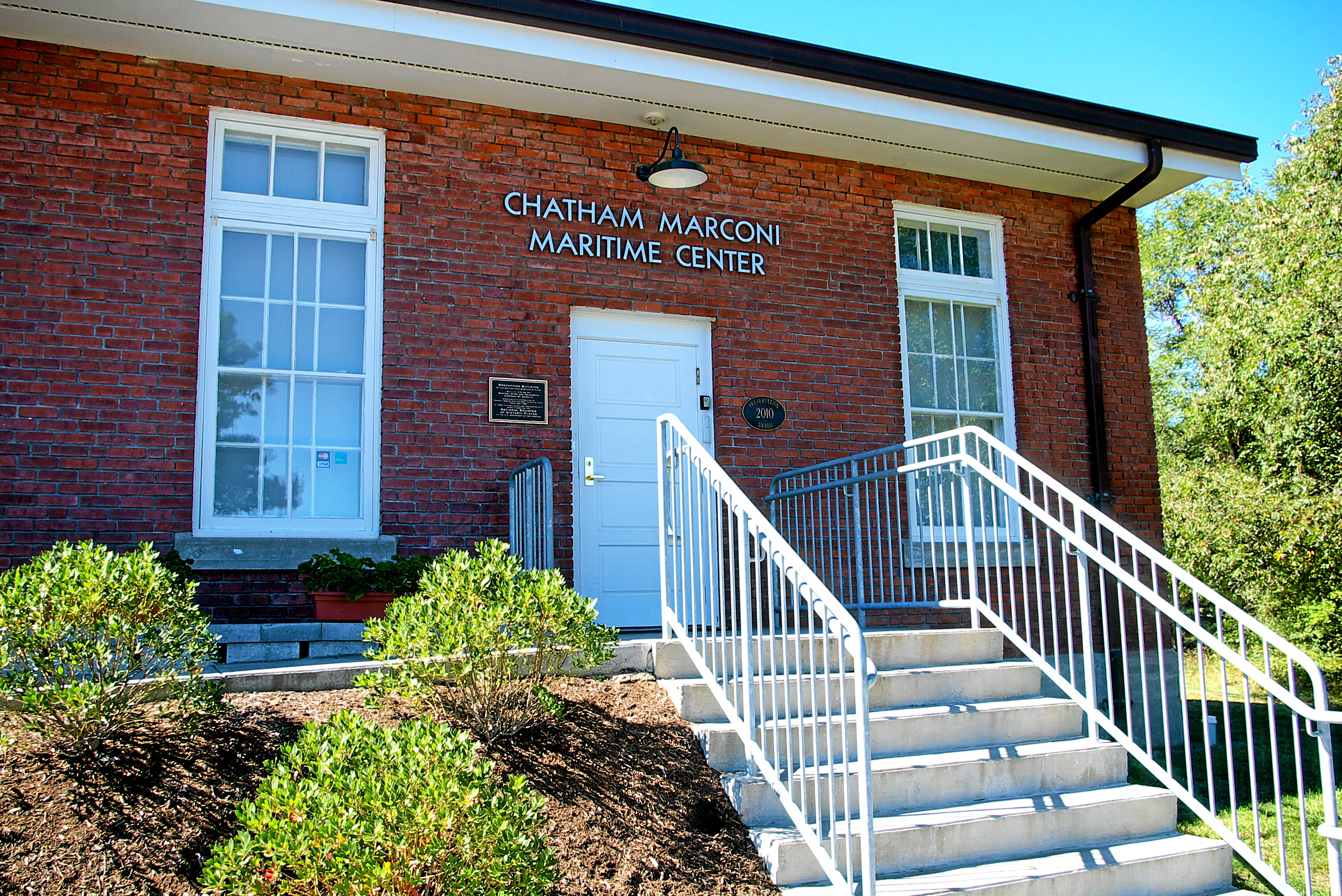
Front of the museum

The Chatham Marconi Maritime Center is a maritime communication history and STEM education center. Chatham Marconi includes the Marconi/RCA-Wireless Museum featuring interactive exhibits, an Education Center offering workshops for children and families, and an Antenna Trail nature walk.
