= List of Marconi wireless stations =

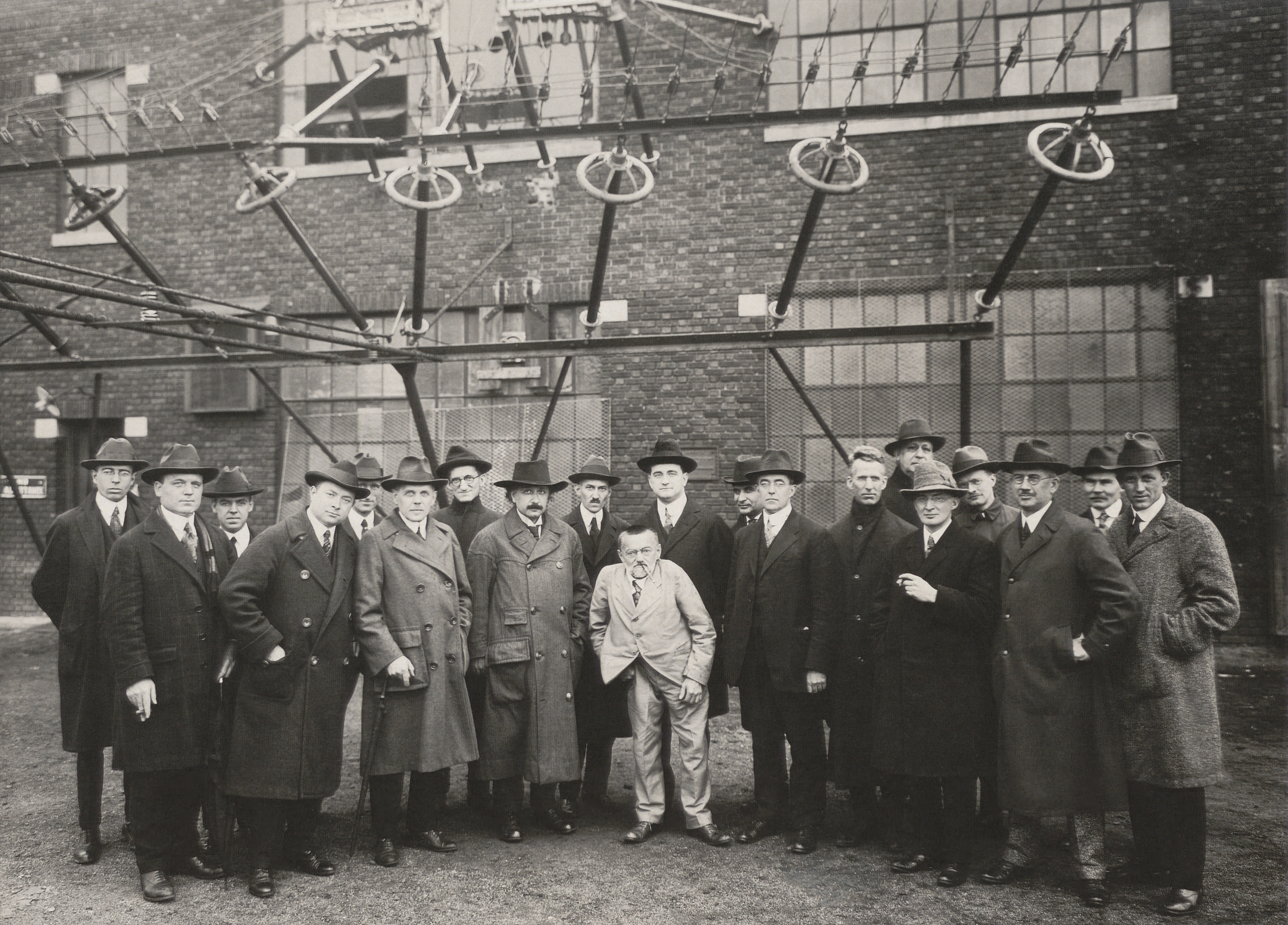
A 1921 photograph of Albert Einstein being given a tour of The New Brunswick Marconi Radio Station in Somerset, New Jersey (then part of RCA) along with RCA officers and leading scientists and engineers in the electrical and radio fields from RCA, General Electric, American Telephone and Telegraph, and Western Electric. The feedlines feeding radio power from the transmitter to the huge flattop wire antenna are visible, top.

A list of early wireless telegraphy radio stations of the Marconi International Marine Communication Company. Guglielmo Marconi developed the first practical radio transmitters and receivers between 1895 and 1901. His company, the Marconi Company which was started in 1897, dominated the early radio industry. During the first two decades of the 20th century the Marconi Co. built the first radiotelegraphy communication stations, which were used to communicate with ships at sea and exchange commercial telegram traffic with other countries using Morse code. Many of these have since been preserved as historic places.

== Types of station ==
The first radio transmitters could not transmit audio (sound) like modern AM and FM transmitters, and instead transmitted information by radiotelegraphy; the transmitter was turned on and off rapidly using a switch called a telegraph key, creating different length pulses of radio waves ("dots" and "dashes") which spelled out text messages in Morse code. Marconi used several types of station:

=== Coastal stations ===
Coastal stations communicated with wireless stations on ships, providing navigation and weather information and relayed communications from ships to other coastal stations and through telegraph systems. Ships were allowed to communicate on three frequencies: 500, 660, and 1000 kHz.

=== Transoceanic stations ===
Transoceanic wireless telegraph stations were large high powered stations with huge antenna structures, with output power of 100 kW to one megawatt. Industrial countries built worldwide networks of these stations to exchange telegram traffic with other nations at intercontinental distances and communicate with a country's overseas colonies. To achieve daylight communication at such long ranges they used frequencies in the very low frequency (VLF) band, from 50 to as low as 15 – 20 kHz. They transmitted Morse code at high speed, 100 – 200 words per minute, using automated paper tape readers.

== Australia ==
In 1906, Marconi constructed an experimental station at Queenscliff, Victoria, successfully communicating between Mainland Australia and Devonport, Tasmania. This station operated on a temporary basis; subsequent Australian wireless efforts would be undertaken by Amalgamated Wireless Australasia, established in 1913 under ownership of Marconi, its commercial arch-rival Telefunken and Australian local business interests.

== Canada ==
The Marconi Company has owned or operated Canadian coastal radio stations since 1902, either as transatlantic radiotelegraph links or as marine radio stations. While eastern Canada's ship-to-shore coastal stations were government-owned after 1915, the Marconi Company had been paid to continue to operate the facilities. Canada's west coast had been served by government-operated stations since 1907; many stations in the Canadian Arctic were military operations.

The Canadian Marconi Company operated manufacturing facilities at Montreal, Quebec and in 1919 had established on an experimental basis the first commercial broadcast radio station, XWA. This operation would become CFCF (AM/FM/TV) and CFCX (shortwave); Marconi would be forced to sell the stations due to foreign-ownership restrictions imposed on Canadian broadcast stations in 1970. The manufacturing operations have now become Ultra Electronics TCS for tactical radio systems and Esterline CMC Electronics for avionic systems.

Since 1954, the federal Department of Transport has operated former Marconi coastal stations in eastern Canada; most served the Great Lakes and the Atlantic coast:

- VAY Cape Hopes Advance, Ungava Bay (1 July 1929 – )
- VBC Midland, Ontario (8 July 1912 – )
- VBH Kingston, Ontario (9 January 1914 – )
- VBK Trois-Rivières, Québec
- VCC Québec, Québec (1910 – )
- VCD Grosse Isle, Quebec(until 1927)
- VCI Heath Point, Anticosti Island (21 July 1904 – 1921)
- VCO North Sydney, Nova Scotia (1907 – )

=== Glace Bay, Nova Scotia ===
On 15 December 1902 Marconi established transatlantic communication between Table Head in Glace Bay, Nova Scotia and Poldhu in Cornwall, England using a 60 kilowatt transmitter and four 210-foot (64 m) towers. The site was expanded and moved inland in 1904–05, increasing both antenna size and transmitter power. Transatlantic radio service between the Marconi Towers and Clifden, Ireland was inaugurated in October 1907, and continued until the Marconi station (operating under callsign VAS, Voice of the Atlantic Seaboard) was shut down and the property sold in 1946. The site of the Marconi Towers station is now used to house a museum.

=== Halifax, Nova Scotia ===
In 1905, Marconi constructed a signal station at Camperdown, Halifax, Nova Scotia (original callsign HX, MHX from 1907 to 1912, VCS thereafter). From 1905 until 1926, this station was to collect traffic from Sable Island (VCT) and Cape Sable (VCU) for manual retransmission via dedicated landline telegraph circuit to Halifax (AX). VCS later would serve as a coast guard marine radio station.

=== Louisbourg, Nova Scotia ===
As the original, powerful spark gap transmitters would create large quantities of electrical interference, stations could not transmit and receive at the same time – even if different wavelengths were used. By 1913, the increasing amount of transatlantic radio telegraph traffic required that existing half-duplex operation be upgraded to a link which could carry messages in both directions at the same time. This was done by geographically separating the receiving stations from the existing transmitter sites; new receiving stations at Letterfrack, Ireland and Louisbourg, Nova Scotia effectively doubled the capacity of the Marconi Company to carry transatlantic telegraph traffic. Instead of the 500 kHz and 1 MHz frequencies common in shipboard radio at the time, Marconi was to use longwave frequencies of 37.5 kHz for transmission from Glace Bay, Cape Breton, Nova Scotia to Letterfrack and 54.5 kHz for transmission from Clifden, Ireland to Louisbourg in order to establish reliable transatlantic communication day and night.

Antennas for longwave radio reception were to occupy huge amounts of land at these sites; while Lee de Forest's work had produced a vacuum tube (or "Audion") as early as 1906, many key advances in electronic amplifiers (which would allow smaller receiving antennas and more efficient transmitter designs) would only be made once improved communications became a military necessity during World War I. The design and construction of tuned circuits able to separate radio signals transmitted and received at different frequency and wavelength had also shown great improvement.

By 1919, improved transmitting and receiving tubes had made transatlantic voice transmission possible. By 1926 Marconi would be able to use shortwave radio to link the British Empire, making the former long-wave transatlantic service and its Louisbourg receiving station obsolete. The Marconi Towers transmitter site on Cape Breton was upgraded to broadcast voice and operated until 1945; the Louisbourg station closed in 1926.

=== Pointe-au-Père, Québec ===
As the nominal point of entry to the St. Lawrence River from the sea, Pointe-au-Père has hosted four lighthouse stations since 1859. A Marconi radiotelegraph station was constructed in 1909. Arriving transatlantic liners would unload mail and take on harbour pilots; Pointe-au-Père also provided a hydrographic station and a quarantine post.

On 29 May 1914 the Pointe-au-Père Marconi station received an S̅O̅S̅ call from the RMS Empress of Ireland, a Canadian passenger liner which, surrounded by fog, had been hit by Norwegian coal freighter SS Storstad. "May have struck ship... listing terribly" reported Marconi operators Edward Bamford and Ronald Ferguson, notifying rescuers on shore of their position twenty miles seaward of Rimouski as the vessel rapidly took on water. In 14 minutes, this collision was to claim 1,012 lives.

== France ==
On 27 March 1899, Marconi transmitted from Wimereux, Boulogne, France the first international wireless message which was received at the South Foreland Lighthouse near Dover, United Kingdom.

== Ireland ==
Ireland was, due to its western location, to play a key role in early efforts to send messages initially from ship to shore, and later for transatlantic messages.

=== Crookhaven ===
In 1902, a Marconi telegraphic station was established in the village of Crookhaven, County Cork, Ireland to provide marine radio communications to ships arriving from the Americas. A ship's master could contact shipping line agents ashore to enquire which port was to receive their cargo without the need to come ashore at what was the first port of landfall.

=== Clifden, Galway ===
As existing submarine cable operators in the early 1900s had held a monopoly on international telegraph service to Newfoundland, Marconi's first regular transatlantic wireless service was established on 17 October 1907 between Derrygimla Bog, Clifden, Galway, Ireland and Glace Bay, Nova Scotia. An additional Marconi receiving station in Letterfrack, Ireland operated briefly from 1913 until 1917.

Due to destruction caused by the Irish Civil War in 1922, traffic formerly carried at Clifden was permanently redirected via Marconi's new station at Ongar in Essex, a link which remained in service until replaced by the Canadian shortwave beam circuit in October 1926.

On 15 June 1919, the first non-stop transatlantic aeroplane crossing by Capt. John Alcock and Lt. Arthur Brown left Newfoundland and made an unplanned landing at the Marconi site in Clifden, Ireland.

=== Ballybunion ===
Despite references in several publications, Ballybunion Station was not built by Marconi, and never operated commercially. The station was built by the Universal Radio Syndicate. Construction started in 1912, but the station had not obtained a commercial licence by the time World War 1 started. The company went into liquidation in 1915. A sister station at Newcastle New Brunswick, built to the same design as Ballybunion, suffered a similar fate. The Marconi Company bought the two stations from the liquidator in 1919, mainly to prevent their use by potential competitors. The stations were not idle in the interim, however, having been appropriated by the British Admiralty almost immediately upon outbreak of the Great War and kept in constant activity as key components of the allied communication system until the Armistice of November 1918.

The Marconi Company did not use the stations commercially, and it would appear that the Ballybunion station was only used briefly, in March 1919 for a successful telephony experiment with the Marconi station in Louisbourg, and for communication with the R34 airship in July 1919.

In March 1919, Marconi engineers H.J Round and W.T. Ditcham made the first east–west transatlantic broadcast of voice, using valve technology, from the Ballybunion station using the callsignYXQ. The first west to east voice transmission had already been achieved by Bell Systems engineers from the US Navy station at Arlington Virginia to the Eiffel Tower in October 1915.

The contents of Clifden and Ballybunion were sold for scrap to a Sheffield-based scrap merchant, Thos. W. Ward in 1925.

== India ==
A Marconi radiotelegraph station had been operational at Delhi, India at the time the Indian capital had moved there from Calcutta in 1911. Marconi had constructed experimental broadcast transmitters in Calcutta, which were to become 2BZ (Calcutta Radio Club, 1923) and 5AF (West Bengal government); these radio stations operated until the national government established a station in 1927.

== Italy ==
On 13 November 1910 the first radio message to Africa was sent from a radiotelegraph station at Coltano, Italy and received in Massawa (then part of the Italian colony of Eritrea). Italy's King Vittorio Emanuele officially opened the station in 1911, at which time messages were sent from Coltano to Glace Bay (Canada) and Massaua.

== Newfoundland ==
The first transatlantic radio message, transmitted from Marconi's Poldhu, Cornwall transmitter, was received 12 December 1901 at Signal Hill, St. John's, Newfoundland. Subsequent efforts at transatlantic communications would use Cape Breton, Nova Scotia as a Canadian terminus due to the Anglo-American Telegraph Company's entrenched monopoly in the Dominion of Newfoundland. Messages for ships at sea would continue to be handled in Newfoundland, due to its strategic location as point of first contact in the east. As of 1915, the following coastal stations were operational in Newfoundland to connect the island to otherwise-isolated outports in Labrador and to handle vital ship-to-shore communication:

- VCE Cape Race (1904–1966, originally CE or MCE)
- VCM Belle Island
- VCR Cape Ray
- VOA Battle Harbour, Labrador
- VOB Venison Island
- VOC American Tickle
- VOD Domino
- VOE Grady
- VOF Smokey Tickle
- VOG Holton
- VOH Cape Harrison
- VOI Makkovik
- VOJ Fogo (1912–1933)
- VOJH Corner Brook (1940–1974)
- VON Cabot Tower/Signal Hill, St. John's (until 1960)

=== Newfoundland coastal stations ===
All radio stations licensed by the Dominion of Newfoundland after 1912 and before the 1 April 1949 Canadian Confederation bear callsigns beginning with VO.

Stations built by the Marconi Company of Canada in outlying areas such as Fogo (VOJ) were funded by the Dominion of Newfoundland and served to report ice and weather conditions, provide communications with sealing vessels and transmit messages from Newfoundland to Labrador coastal fisheries. By the 1930s, original spark gap transmitter equipment at these sites would have been removed due to severe interference caused to broadcast radio operations.

=== Cape Race and Cape Ray ===
Canadian Marconi Company stations with Canadian VC calls did exist on Newfoundland in the wireless telegraph era, even though Newfoundland was not part of Canada. These stations were permitted by Newfoundland authorities to operate solely in communication with ships at sea; transatlantic radiotelegraph service to land-based stations in the United Kingdom and Europe operated from Cape Breton in Canada.

Exploiting a strategic location at the south-easternmost part of Newfoundland, the Cape Race (VCE) station could serve as a vital first point of contact for arriving ships in the New World, as well as providing telegram service to transatlantic passenger liners. Messages received from travellers crossing the Atlantic could be relayed in a timely fashion to much of North America, including major cities such as New York, long before a ship's arrival. A lighthouse and direction-finding radio were also once active at this site

The Cape Race site, active as a coast radio station until 1966, is now home to the Myrick Communications Museum and a radioamateur commemorative station, VO1MCE. A copy of April 1912 station logs (documenting communication between Cape Race and Titanic) appear in the Maritime Museum of the Atlantic in Halifax, Nova Scotia.

The Cape Ray (VCR) and Belle Isle (VCM) stations, which played a similar role, served ocean-going liners in the Gulf of St. Lawrence.

== Spain ==
On 1 February 1912 a new Marconi station erected at Aranjuez near Madrid, Spain transmitted a message from King Alfonso which would be received at Poldhu, Cornwall, England for delivery to the London correspondent of the New York Times.

== South Africa ==
In the Boer War era of 1899, Marconi wireless equipment would face one of its first tests in military deployment with mixed results. Initial attempts to deploy land-based military radio were problematic, but the five Marconi installations in March 1900 on naval cruisers HMS Dwarf, Forte, Magicienne, Racoon and Thetis proved successful.

By 1912, Marconi stations covered Aden, Algeria, Australia, Azores, Belgium, Brazil, Burma, China, Curaçao, France, French Guiana, Germany, India, Italy, Japan, Jamaica, Mexico, Morocco, Netherlands, Norway, Romania, Russia, Senegal, South Africa, Sweden, Tobago, Trinidad, Uruguay, Zanzibar, and the Pacific Ocean. Efforts in 1926 to build an Imperial Wireless Chain spanning the globe would bring new construction of Marconi wireless facilities to much of the British Empire, including South Africa and India. Shortwave radio would deployed as a means to communicate internationally with smaller transmitters and more directional antennas than had been possible on the former longwave system. These directional-antenna (or "beam antenna") installations were known as the Imperial Beam system; Marconi Beam as a geographic place name still refers to a section of modern Cape Town, South Africa, as one location where such facilities historically had operated.

== United Kingdom ==
In December 1898, the Marconi Company opened the first wireless factory at Chelmsford in Essex. Marconi stations in the United Kingdom would be the first to be received internationally in France and later Newfoundland. A message received in 1910 in the UK from Marconi-equipped ship SS Montrose, then en route to Canada, would prove key to the arrest of fugitive Hawley Harvey Crippen. A station existed at Devizes but its use was interrupted by the Great War.

=== Poldhu, Cornwall ===
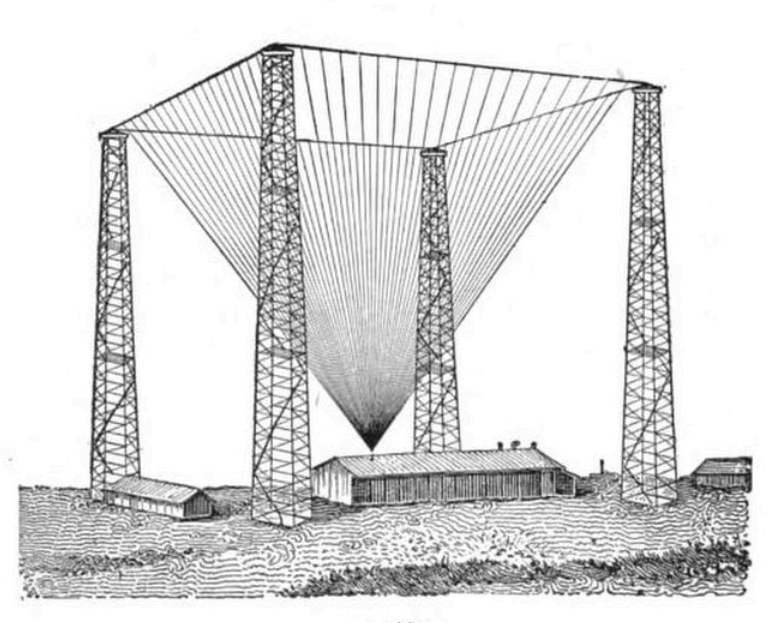
Marconi's Poldhu wireless station, showing 200 ft. antenna constructed after transatlantic transmission.

Marconi's station at Poldhu, Cornwall, England, initially constructed in October 1900 on a cliff in a remote location to avoid publicity during initial experimentation, was the first large radio transmitter in the world. Marconi decided in 1899 to attempt transatlantic communication. This required higher power; prior to this transmitters used induction coils with an output power of 100–200 watts, with maximum range of about 150 miles. He hired an electric power expert, Prof. John Ambrose Fleming, who designed and built a complex spark transmitter with three cascaded tuned circuits and two spark gaps, powered by a 25 kW generator turned by a combustion engine. This fed an inverted conical wire antenna consisting of 200 wires suspended from a circle of wooden masts. The frequency used is not known precisely as Marconi did not measure frequency or wavelength, but is thought to have been around 500 kHz.

By 1901 it had transmitted messages to ships at sea over distances of more than 200 miles. On 12 December 1901, the first transatlantic message from the Poldhu wireless station was received at St. John's in the Dominion of Newfoundland, a distance of 2100 miles (3300 km). Reliable transatlantic communication was not achieved until several years later with a more powerful transmitter.

Prior to the Poldhu station being constructed stations were constructed at Bass Point on the Lizard, Cornwall and St Katherines Point on the Isle of Wight, these stations were used to prove that radio signals would follow the curvature of the Earth, the distance being 198 miles. Both stations used basic spark transmitters to wire antennas. After the trials and the construction of Poldhu, Bass Point became a ship to shore station until 1912. Bass Point is now a museum showing spark transmitters and receivers, they also have a rare Marconi wire detector. The Bass Point site houses the amateur radio station, GB4LD.

In 1905 transatlantic communication was shifted to a new lower frequency transmitter at Clifden, Ireland. The Poldhu station was used for communication with Atlantic shipping and European countries until 1922, then as a research station until 1934 when it was dismantled. A Marconi memorial remains at this site today.

=== Dover, Kent ===
In 1898, Marconi began tests of ship-to-shore communication between Trinity House Lighthouse, Dover, Kent, England and the East Goodwin lightship. In 1899, South Foreland Lighthouse at St. Margaret's Bay, Dover was used by Guglielmo Marconi to receive the first international transmission (from Wimereux, France). Dover received the first ship-to-shore message (from the East Goodwin lightship) and the first ship-to-shore distress message (when a steamship ran into the same lightship, and the lighthouse relayed the message up the coast to the Walmer lifeboat).

=== Newhaven, East Sussex ===
The Newhaven Marconi Radio Station was established at Newhaven, East Sussex in 1904, and started running in 1905. The station achieved ship to shore radio communications around 1912.

=== Tetney, Lincolnshire ===
A station at Tetney, Lincolnshire, England, constructed as part of the Imperial Wireless Chain linking the nations of the British Empire, established shortwave communications with Australia in April 1927 and India in September 1927.

=== Carnarvon, Wales ===
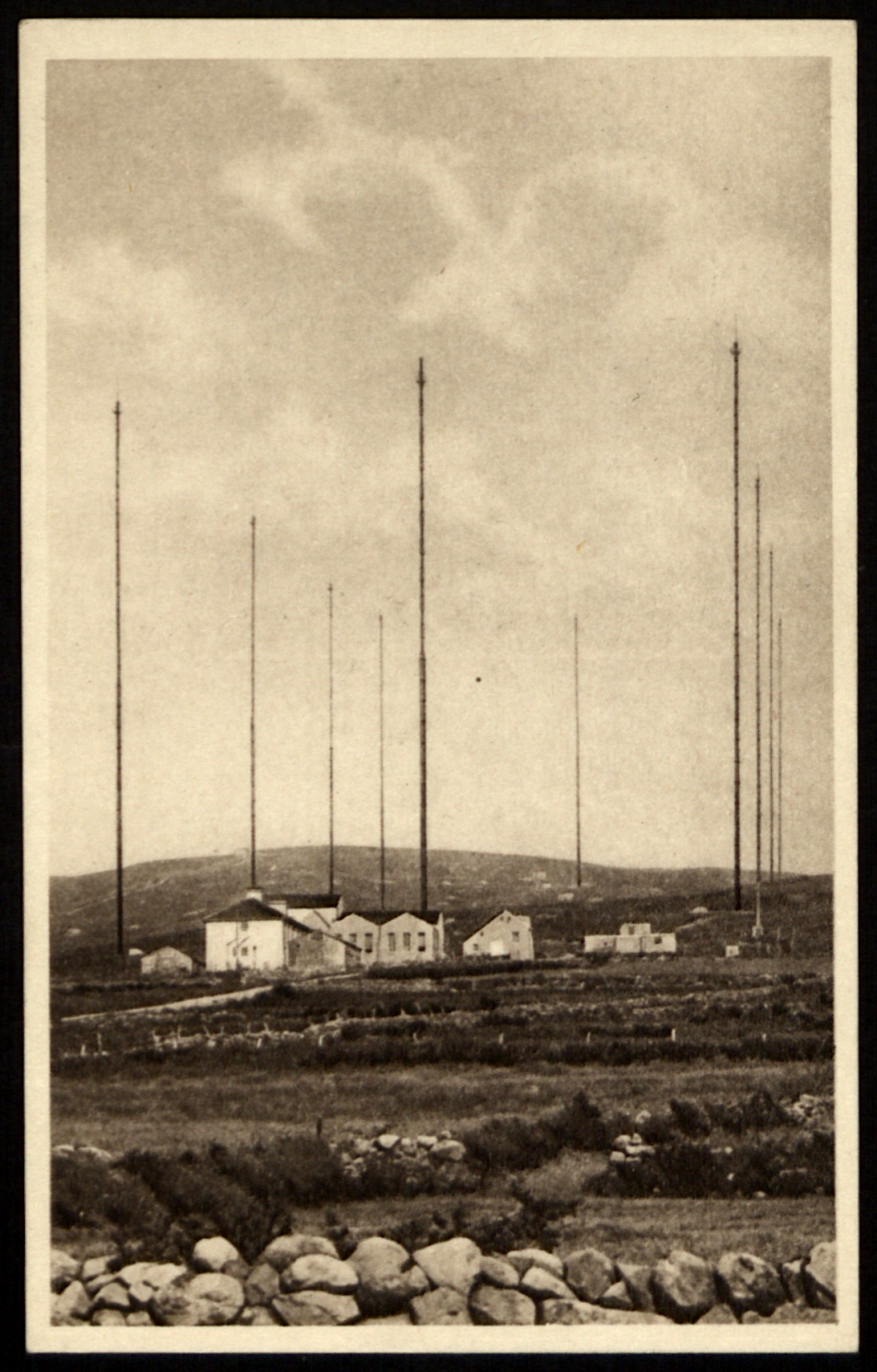
Marconi Carnarvon, MUU ca. 1914

In 1914, the Marconi Wireless Telegraph Company constructed a 400 KW wireless transmitting station (callsign MUU) in Carnarvon (now spelled as 'Caernarfon') to send transatlantic messages to the US from a 3600' series of parallel wires hung from ten 400-foot masts along the slopes of Cefn Du mountain in Snowdonia (Eryri). The station served throughout World War I under government control, and remained in operation until its last transmission in November 1938. The station was dismantled in spring, 1939.

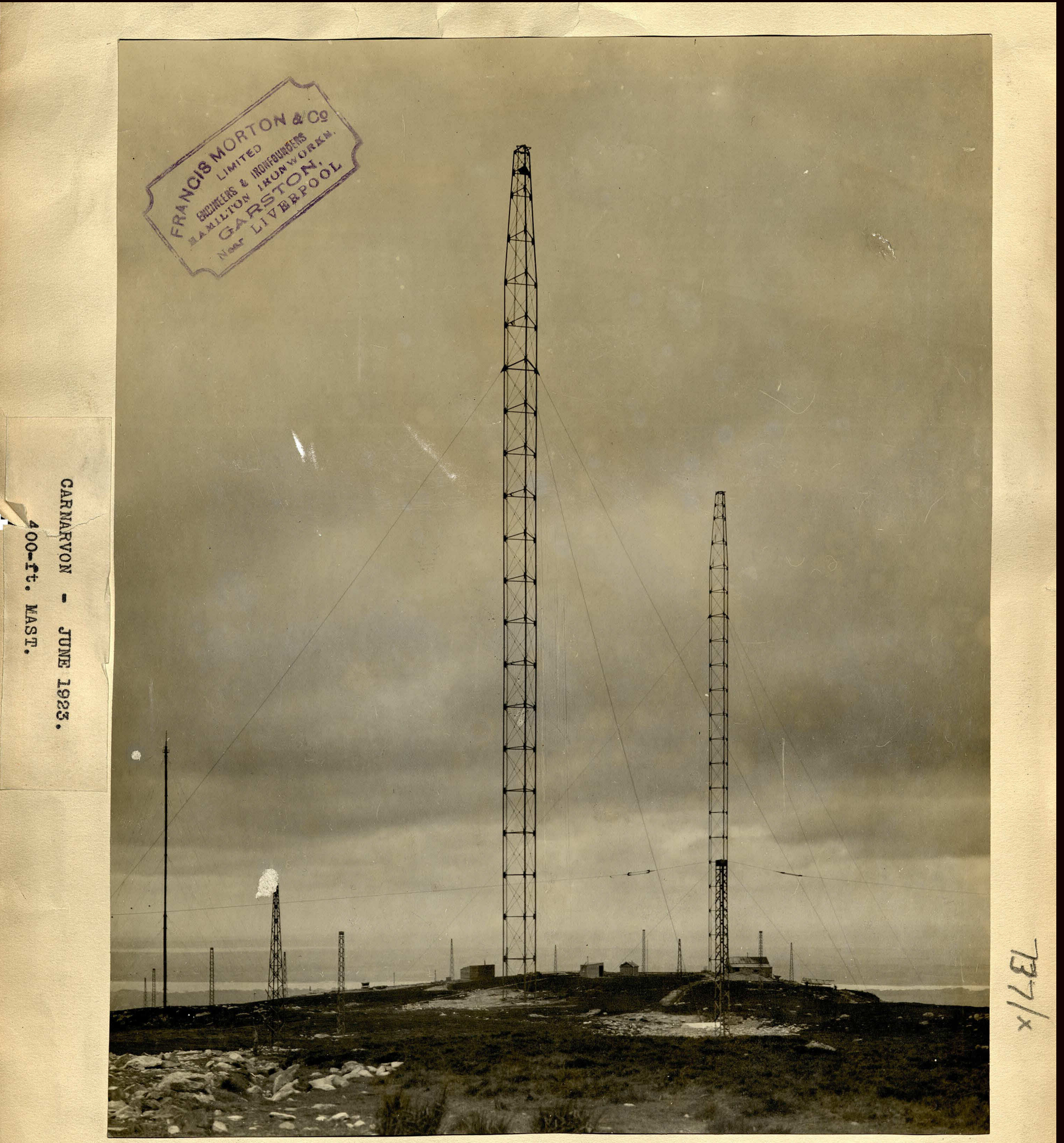
1923 extension to the 1914 Marconi antenna.

On 22 September 1918 the first wireless telegraph message to Australia was sent from Carnarvon. On 22 September 1918, advances in vacuum tube receivers allowed the MUU signal to be received by the Amalgamated Wireless Australasia station at "Logan Brae", Pymble, Sydney.

In 1922, the Marconi transmitting station at Caernarvon, Wales replaced the former station at Clifden, Galway, Ireland for transatlantic message traffic following destruction of Marconi's Clifden station during the Irish Civil War. The obsolete Clifden Station was never rebuilt.

Cefn Du, the mountain on which MUU was located hosted the first, 1914 antenna. It was, in 1920, extended by 500' (wire length), using two self-supporting steel lattice towers, 60' on a side. These were removed ca. early 1923, when a new extension, running to the ENE, towards Llanberis, was built using six new guyed lattice masts of 400'. One mast, number 13, collapsed during construction. It was rebuilt and reassigned as mast 17. A double antenna tuning inductor house near the summit of Cefn Du and to the rear of the 1914 antenna, served to tune the antenna and earth screens of what were now two parts of a whole antenna, fed at the western transmitter building. The extension also had inductors at the far end, such that each part of the antenna had inductors at its ends, forming a 'half-loop'-type antenna when considered as a whole. In 1925, the two parts of the antenna were split, each now operating separately (the original array from the GLC transmitter, the 1924 antenna from the MUU transmitter), a new feed taken up the mountain from the western transmitter buildings to the site of the double ATI. Archive documents indicate both arrays could be connected as one antenna when required. A 'second antenna', said by R.N. Vyvyan to have been built in 1925 and states by him as operating under the callsign GLT, is undetectable as physical remains at the Cefn Du site. Research by Rowlands (2022) identified documents in the Marconi Archive that unambiguously and repeatedly referred to the 1925 antenna as callsign GLJ, not GLT. Archive sketches indicate it may have been hung from sloping triatics run from the existing 1914 array masts to the north of the site. GLJ presented considerable difficulties to effective operation, partly owing to its proximity to the 1914 array; it took until early 1927 to bring under reliable control.

A companion receiving station was situated 40 miles further south at Tywyn, from where the transmitter was keyed. Both the transmitting and receiving stations were heavily guarded by a series of brick blockhouses around the perimeter of the sites. The units involved included No 1 Defence Company 6th RWF (Defences). In 1914, this consisted of 3 Officers, 117 other ranks at Waunfawr.

Carnarvon's antennas were demolished in June 1939 and the site extensively cleared. Today, the concrete bases and mast stays of both the 1914, 1920 and 1923 antennas and extensions remain prominent for the most part. Please respect the remains, if visiting. The station buildings and immediate surroundings are on private land, but much of the rest of the antenna site is Open Access Land. Cadw, the Welsh Government's heritage arms-length 'quango' has refused to schedule or list any part of the Carnarvon site, citing (2024) lack of resources and that the planning system provides sufficient notice of any intended development.

== United States ==
The Marconi Wireless Telegraph Company of America (American Marconi), incorporated in New Jersey in 1899, had by 1908 deployed five land stations and 40 marine stations. It would operate wireless stations until, with the entry of the United States into World War I, the US Navy assumed wartime control of wireless. It would continue manufacturing activities until the American Marconi factory in Aldene, NJ was acquired by General Electric in 1919 and its wireless operations and facilities were acquired by the Radio Corporation of America in 1920.

=== New Jersey ===
Marconi's transatlantic radiotelegraph stations were deployed in pairs; a station near New Brunswick, New Jersey would transmit while another at Belmar would receive the weak signals from across the Atlantic. American Marconi had also established a factory in 1907 in Aldene, New Jersey.

New Brunswick Marconi Station (40.51529°N 74.48895°W) was located at County Route 501 and Easton Avenue just a few minutes from the New Brunswick border in Somerset, New Jersey. Today it is the site of Marconi Park. It was an early radio transmitter facility built in 1913 and operated by the American Marconi. After the partial failure of transatlantic telegraph cables, the facility was confiscated by the US Navy in January 1918 to provide vital transatlantic communications during World War I. The New Brunswick Naval Radio Station was the principal wartime communication link between the United States and Europe, using the callsign NFF. President Woodrow Wilson's Fourteen Points speech was transmitted by NFF in 1918. Ownership of the station, along with Marconi's other US stations, were transferred from the Navy to RCA in 1920. The antenna masts were demolished in 1952 to make room for what is now a small mall containing a Kmart, but the buildings on the other side of JFK Boulevard were spared. All but one of the brick buildings were demolished around 2004 to make way for a storage locker facility. The bricks and tiles were saved for use in any future restoration of the spared building, and the second facility in Belmar, New Jersey.

The Belmar Marconi receiving station was located at what are now Camp Evans buildings in Wall Township, New Jersey. The original buildings were built by the Marconi Wireless Telegraph Company of America under a contract to the J.G. White Engineering Corp. between 1912 and 1914 as part of Guglielmo Marconi's "wireless girdle" around the Earth. It was then known as the Belmar Station (40.1859°N 74.0594°W). The Belmar Station served as Marconi's receiving station, "duplexed" with his New Brunswick (40.5153°N 74.4889°W) high power transmitting station. An operator in Belmar keyed the New Brunswick transmitter, 32 miles (51 km) to the northwest, through a landline connection. Edwin Armstrong and David Sarnoff tested and perfected the regenerative circuit at the Belmar site, on the night of 31 January/1 February 1914. Albert Hoyt Taylor, who later made important contributions toward the development of radar, was Communication Superintendent at the station during World War I. The station was closed in 1924, after receiver functions were transferred to RCA's new Radio Central receiver site on Long Island, NY.

=== New York ===
As early as 1 March 1904, messages for steamship passengers at sea were accepted at Western Union landline telegraph offices, where they would be transmitted overland to Sagaponack or Babylon, New York and delivered to Marconi Wireless Telegraph for transmission to steamships of the Cunard Line, American Line, French Line, North German Lloyd Line, Atlantic Transport Line, Hamburg-American Line or Red Star Line.

In 1912, a Marconi station atop the Wanamaker's Department Store building in New York City was to receive a list of RMS Titanic passengers aboard the RMS Carpathia, delivering the news to Hearst newspapers before the ship's arrival. An operator at this station, David Sarnoff, would go on to lead the Radio Corporation of America.

=== Cape Cod, Massachusetts ===
A Marconi station built in 1902 at South Wellfleet, Cape Cod, Massachusetts (initial callsign CC, MCC 1908 to 1911, finally WCC from 1911,) transmitted its first telegraphic message via spark gap transmitter in 1903 from what is now known as the National Park Service "Marconi Area," about a mile north of the entrance to Marconi Beach. Marine radio traffic carried before the station closed in 1917 included news and telegrams for passengers of the RMS Lusitania, distress calls from the RMS Titanic in 1912 and a message between the American president and the British king in 1903.

The South Wellfleet antennas and equipment were dismantled by the U.S. Navy in 1919, replaced by Marconi's new receiver station built in 1914 in Chatham, Massachusetts and its paired transmitter station also built in 1914 in Marion, Massachusetts. The South Wellfleet site is now part of the Cape Cod National Seashore, the Chatham receiver site is now operated as a museum by the Chatham Marconi Maritime Center, and most of the 143 acres of the Marion Station were donated to the Sippican Lands Trust, where hundreds of artifacts remain publicly accessible. The Marion Station transmitter building is operated as a private business and the hotel and three bungalows are privately owned. The original tower still stands to this day, and is used for the antennas for local police/fire telecommunications.

=== Point Reyes, California ===
WCC is just one of two former Marconi stations on US national parkland; a California coastal radio station (callsign KPH), formerly operated by Marconi and later RCA, is located at Point Reyes National Seashore.

In 1913, an American Marconi Company transmitting station was established at Bolinas. The receiving station KPH was about twenty miles further north, in the town of Marshall, at Point Reyes. In 1914, the stations at Bolinas and Marshall would allow messages received from New Brunswick, New Jersey to be retransmitted to Hawaii.

KPH has been preserved by volunteer members of the Maritime Radio Historical Society and is operated at weekends and on special occasions such as International Marconi Day and the anniversary of the "end of commercial Morse code in America." The station volunteers also use the alternative callsign KSM and amateur radio club callsign K6KPH.

=== Bolinas, California ===
Built in 1919 by Marconi, it was taken over in 1920 by the Radio Corporation of America (RCA).

=== Hawaii ===
Marconi's radiotelegraph was to serve both as a means of establishing communications between the various Hawaiian Islands and as a means to receive messages from the Americas (notably California and Panama) for retransmission to Japan and Asia. In the early days of wireless communications, Marconi used the Hawaiian Islands as a test run. His future plans included creating an international wireless network. Hawaii was the small scale, with the largest distance of approximately 78 miles. Marconi was able to improve his system when in Hawaii, and received very good reviews from the governor of Hawaii. In 1912, the Marconi Company proposed what it billed as "A Wireless Girdle around the Earth"; proposing that as a station in Great Britain could communicate with one in Belmar, New Jersey (serving New York City), that station in turn could reach Panama and from there a signal could be sent to Hawaii. A powerful station constructed in Hawaii could by 1914 reach San Francisco, California, receiving messages which could be transmitted to the Philippines once a later station was constructed there. From Manila, Philippines, messages eventually could be resent to a British station in Singapore which would then reach Bangalore, India. From there, a signal sent to a station in Africa could eventually be retransmitted to Egypt or Cyprus, and the Egyptian station would reach London.

In 1915, the New York Times announced "The opening of the Japanese Marconi wireless plant at Funabashi near Yokohama with messages on Tuesday to the Marconi station at Kahuku, Hawaii, extended the Marconi service nearly two-thirds the way around the globe. If the war had not interfered with the creation of the British Imperial chain, it might have been possible by this time to relay a message by wireless all the way around the world." A Marconi station at Kahuku on the North Shore of Oahu, Hawaii was later operated by RCA; the site was re-purposed as an air base during World War II and is now abandoned. The property on which the old Marconi station sits, is referred to as Makai Ranch. The buildings currently sit vacant, as the owner is awaiting eminent domain transfer or permits before restoration can begin.

== See also ==
- Invention of radio § Marconi
- History of radio § British Marconi
- Coast radio station and marine radio

Other coastal stations:

- Poldhu#Marconi's Poldhu Wireless Station
- Somerset, New Jersey#Marconi Station

Successor companies:

- Marconi Electronic Systems
- Marconi Research Centre
