= Radar beacon =

Transmitter-receiver associated with a fixed navigational mark

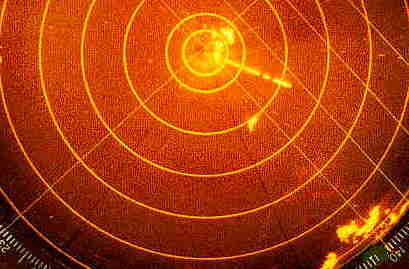
Racon signal as seen on a radar screen. This beacon receives using sidelobe suppression and transmits the letter "Q" in Morse code near Boston Harbor (Nahant) 17 January 1985.

Radar beacon (short: racon) is – according to article 1.103 of the International Telecommunication Union's (ITU) ITU Radio Regulations (RR) – defined as "A transmitter-receiver associated with a fixed navigational mark which, when triggered by a radar, automatically returns a distinctive signal which can appear on the display of the triggering radar, providing range, bearing and identification information." Each station (transmitter-receiver, transceiver or transponder) shall be classified by the service in which it operates permanently or temporarily.

== Principle of operation ==
When a racon receives a radar pulse, it responds with a signal on the same frequency which puts an image on the radar display. This takes the form of a short line of dots and dashes forming a Morse character radiating away from the location of the beacon on the normal plan position indicator radar display. The length of the line usually corresponds to the equivalent of a few nautical miles on the display.

Within the United States, the United States Coast Guard operates about 80 racons, and other organisations also operate them, for example the owners of oil platforms. Their use for purposes other than aids to navigation is prohibited, and they are used to mark:

- lighthouses and navigation buoys
  - by far the majority are on buoys rather than lighthouses. Examples:
    - Boston Harbor, only the Boston Lighted Whistle Buoy B and the North Channel Entrance Lighted Whistle Buoy NC have racons (showing "B" and "N", respectively)
    - San Diego Harbor at the San Diego Bay Approach Lighted Whistle Buoy SD
- navigable spans under bridges such as
  - Arthur Ravenel Bridge
  - Golden Gate Bridge
  - San Francisco–Oakland Bay Bridge (three racons)
- to identify centre lines and turning points
- offshore oil platforms and other structures
  - including approximately 35 in the Gulf of Mexico

In other parts of the world they are also used to indicate:

- temporary, new and uncharted hazards (with a Morse character "D")
- as leading line racons

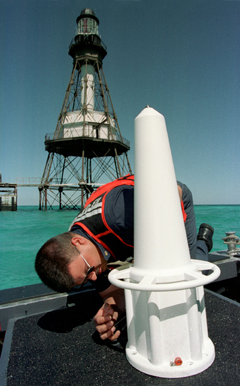
A United States Coast Guard technician prepares a racon for installation at Fowey Rocks Light southeast of Miami.

Their characteristics are defined in the ITU-R Recommendation M.824, Technical Parameters of Radar Beacons (RACONS). Racons usually operate on the 9320 MHz to 9500 MHz marine radar band (X-band), and most also operate on the 2920 MHz to 3100 MHz marine radar band (S-band). Modern racons are frequency-agile; they have a wide-band receiver that detects the incoming radar pulse, tunes the transmitter and responds with a 25 microsecond long signal within 700 nanoseconds.

Older racons operate in a slow sweep mode, in which the transponder sweeps across the X-band over 1 or 2 minutes. It only responds if it happens to be tuned to the frequency of an incoming radar signal at the moment it arrives, which in practice means it responds only around 5% of the time.

To avoid the response masking important radar targets behind the beacon, racons only operate for part of the time. In the United Kingdom, a duty cycle of about 30% is used — usually 20 seconds in which the racon will respond to radar signals is followed by 40 seconds when it will not, or sometimes 9 seconds on and 21 seconds off (as in the case of the Sevenstones Lightship). In the United States a longer duty cycle is used, 50% for battery-powered buoys (20 seconds on, 20 seconds off) and 75% for on-shore beacons.

Ramarks are wide-band beacons which transmit continuously on the radar bands without having to be triggered by an incoming radar signal. The transmission forms a line of Morse characters on the display radiating from the centre of the display to its edge. They are not used in the United States.

== Enhanced RACON ==
Enhanced RACON (or e-RACON) is a proposal for introducing unique identification to the radar response of a RACON, enabling enhanced RADAR positioning.

This proposal is currently being brought forward to the maritime industry by the Danish Maritime Safety Administration through IALA. The recommendations and performance requirements for RACON are under consideration for revision, due to issues of limited ability to trigger RACON responses introduced by New Technology (NT) Radar.

An opportunity for practical testing of the concept in 2011 is being considered in the EfficienSea project, partly financed by the Baltic Sea Region Programme and coordinated by the Danish Maritime Safety Administration.

=== Principle ===
When a traditional RACON receives a radar pulse, it responds with a signal which on a radar screen takes the form of a short line of dashes and dots forming a Morse character radiating away from the location of the beacon. Typically, the Morse character starts with a dash – a long, continuous signal.

The proposal for Enhanced RACON is to further modulate this first dash, with a small amount of digital information to enable either the unique identification of this particular RACON (for instance 30 bits of data identifying the RACON by a MMSI) or alternatively to identify the position of the RACON.

Introducing a unique identification would enable enhanced RADAR positioning through the ability to correlate the radar response of a RACON with the known position of that RACON. This could either be derived from an associated AIS signal representing the same object with the same identifier, or potentially in the future from information contained in a nautical publication, such as an electronic navigational chart in the emerging S-100 format.

== See also ==
- AIS-SART
- Emergency position-indicating radiobeacon station (EPIRB)
- Marine VHF radio
- Radio station
- Radiocommunication service
- Search and rescue transponder
- Ramark
