= Maritime emergency =

A maritime emergency refers to any critical situation at sea where a vessel or its crew faces immediate distress, such as mechanical failure, fire, severe weather, medical emergencies, or collisions. These emergencies can trigger rescue operations involving specialized maritime safety measures and coordination between various maritime organizations.

Modern maritime emergency response include rapid alert systems like the Global Maritime Distress and Safety System GMDSS, which enables vessels to send distress signals and receive assistance. The International Maritime Organization (IMO) and the International Convention on Maritime Search and Rescue (SAR) Convention set the framework for coordinated rescue operations, ensuring that distress situations are managed efficiently and that vessels provide assistance to those in need.

== See also ==
- Coast guard
- Emergency Position-Indicating Radio Beacon (EPIRB)
- Flare gun
- Global Maritime Distress Safety System
- Lifeboat
- Mayday
