= Enhanced RADAR positioning =

Proposed method of position fixing based on radar navigation

Enhanced radar positioning is a proposal for a position fixing system in maritime navigation, based on radar navigation. It is the automation of the process of determining own position by means of radar fixing, using a multitude of objects with known position as reference.

The proposal was originally made by Jens K. Jensen from the Danish Maritime Safety Administration in 2009, in relation to the need for an independent source for position fixing, due to the vulnerabilities of GPS and other satellite navigation systems, identified during the work at IALA on IMO's e-Navigation strategy.

This proposal is currently being brought forward to the maritime industry through IALA, and an opportunity for practical testing of the concept in 2011 is being considered in the EfficienSea project partly financed by the Baltic Sea Region Programme and coordinated by the Danish Maritime Safety Administration.

== Principle ==
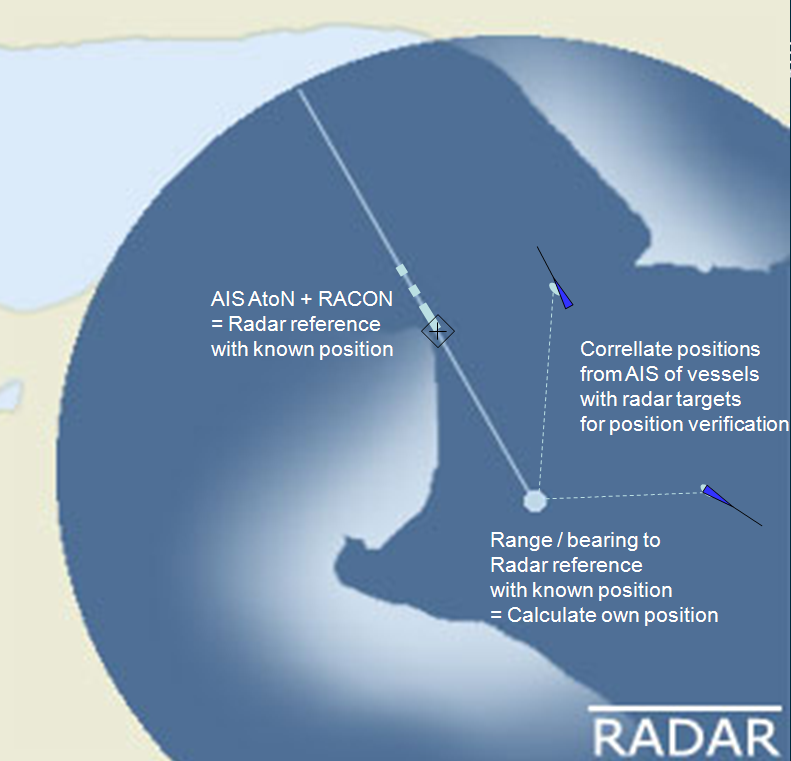

The navigation radar of a ship is currently considered a primary position verification device by navigators, as the radar can be used to identify conspicuous objects or coast lines, giving range/bearing to objects of a known charted position.

If a radar target - and thus the associated range / bearing of a conspicuous object - can be automatically correlated with the known position of that object in an automated manner, radar can be upgraded to an automated positioning system - or position verification system - and may ultimately function as a terrestrial back-up option for satellite positioning (GNSS).

Enhanced radar positioning is achieved through the continuous automated process of correlating a multitude of radar targets with a list of known objects in the vicinity of a vessel, with known position.

== Components ==
Through AIS, the positions of surrounding vessels are known, and could be used for automated correlation with radar targets – providing a position verification mechanism. This, however, requires a fairly precise á priori knowledge of own position and heading. The AIS positions of vessels are likely to be dependent on a GNSS system – typically GPS - and will thus be susceptible to the same vulnerabilities as the own vessels GNSS receiver.

AIS AtoN signals – or dedicated Application Specific Messages or information contained in additional chart object information in the S-100 ENC framework – could be used to identify the presence of conspicuous, fixed or floating objects, that are suitable for radar reference. Dedicated messages could provide their position information, including the object shape, source and accuracy of position indication. The surveyed position of a fixed AtoN would constitute a very good radar reference with high accuracy, while the GNSS position of a floating AIS equipped AtoN would constitute a less reliable reference.

The introduction of Enhanced RACON (e-RACON) will enable radar based positioning that does not require an á priori knowledge of own position and heading, provided that the position of that e-RACON is known. This will enable enhanced radar positioning to be a reliable terrestrial positioning mechanism, truly independent of GNSS systems and their vulnerabilities, in areas equipped with e-RACON.
