= Short Range Certificate =

Short Range Certificate

The Short Range Certificate is an internationally valid certificate issued to marine radio station operators. It entitles the holder to participate in marine communications on leisure crafts using Marine VHF radio and DSC (Digital Selective Calling), while in the GMDSS A1 sea areas.

The certificate is consistent with the agreement of the Article S47 of the ITU Radio Regulations.

== Issuing authorities ==
Depending on local legislation, the certificate can be issued e.g. by a maritime association such as the Royal Yachting Association in the UK, or a regulatory agency such as FICORA in Finland.

== Content of the Royal Yachting Association (RYA) Short Range Certificate (SRC) Training and Examination ==
The training course can be taken online or face to face in a classroom. The course covers;

- VHF Marine Radio
- VHF DSC
- GMDSS Procedures
- Voice Procedures
- Phonetic Alphabet
- NAVTEX
- Emergency Position Indicating Radio Beacons (EPIRBs)
- Search and Rescue Transponders (SARTs)

Candidates are then examined face to face on the above subjects. The exam contains two parts, The written paper and the practical exam. The practical exam makes use of live marine VHF sets that have had the transmit function disabled.

== See also ==
- Long Range Certificate
- Beschränkt gültiges Funkbetriebszeugnis, German short range certificate
