= Morgan's Hill =

Hill in Wiltshire, England

- Site of Special Scientific Interest
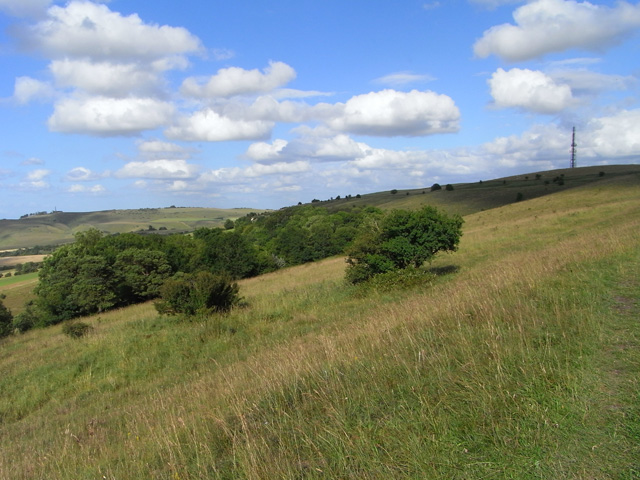

- Location within Wiltshire
- Location of Morgan's Hill.
- Area of search: Wiltshire
- Grid reference: SU028672
- Coordinates: 51.4034°N 1.9615°W
- Interest: Biological
- Area: 12.6 hectares (0.1260 km^{2}; 0.04865 sq mi)
- Notification date: 1951
- Location map: Magic Map of Natural England

Morgan's Hill (grid reference SU028672) is a 12.6-hectare (31-acre) biological Site of Special Scientific Interest between Calne and Devizes in Wiltshire, England. The SSSI was notified in 1951 and again in 1987.

== Nature reserve ==
The site is also a nature reserve of the Wiltshire Wildlife Trust.

The main habitat on the site is chalk grassland, largely dominated by upright brome (Bromus erectus). Species present which have a particular affinity for the chalk habitat include chalk milkwort (Polygala calcarea), horseshoe vetch (Hippocrepis comosa) and autumn gentian (Gentianella amarella).

Several scarce and notable species occur, including round-headed rampion (Phyteuma orbiculare), bastard toadflax (Thesium humifusum), fly orchid (Ophrys insectifera), fragrant orchid (Gymnadenia conopsea), lesser butterfly orchid (Platanthera bifolia), frog orchid (Coeloglossum viride), musk orchid (Herminium monorchis) and – unusually for a downland site – marsh helleborine (Epipactis palustris).

== Communications site ==
=== History ===
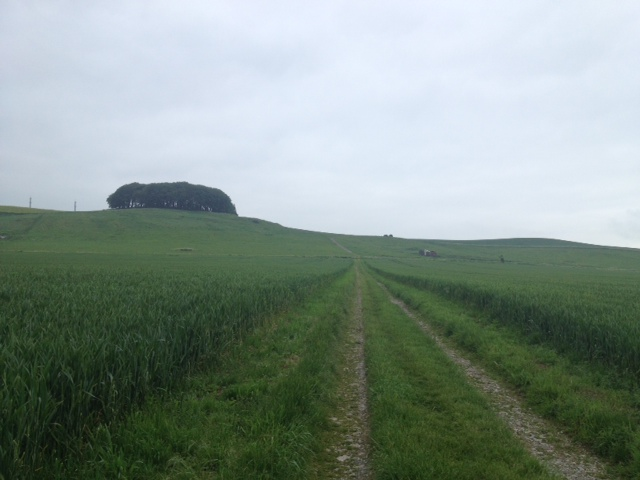
The hill from the south

A Marconi Imperial Wireless Chain receiving station was built on the south-east slopes of the hill in 1913, as the receiving station for the Leafield transmitter station in Oxfordshire. The contract for the Imperial Chain was terminated by the Post Office after the outbreak of war and the station was not used for its original function when Leafield was resurrected after the War.

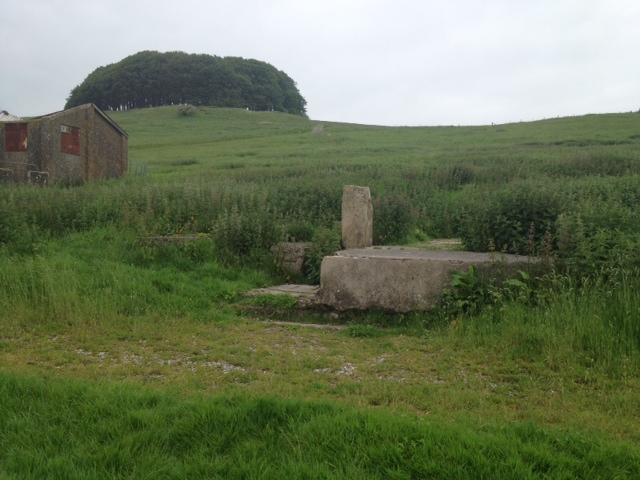
The remaining concrete bases from the original masts

The structure was converted to military use in 1916 for the Royal Engineers as an army intelligence station, used to determine the position of German Zeppelins and communication stations. The plans for the structure showed masts 300 feet (91 m) high and 2,700 yards (2,500 m) long. It is not known when the station closed but sources show that it was considered redundant by 1919.

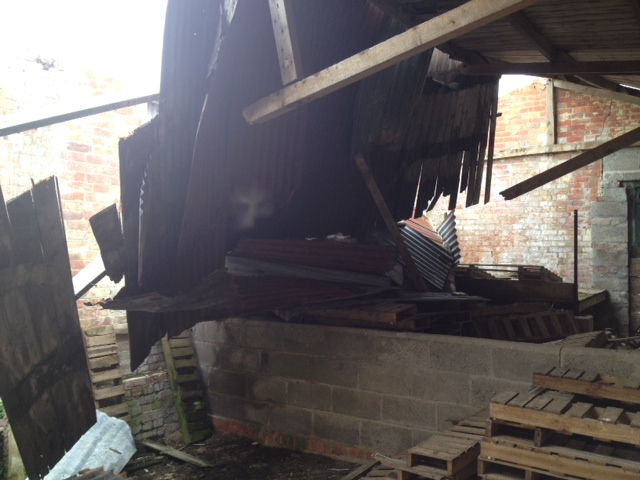
The interior of the last remaining equipment hut

In 1919 the General Post Office and the Marconi Company agreed to convert the receiving station into Britain's first long-range maritime communications station. The station opened in 1920 with the callsign 'GKT' and was equipped with a six-kilowatt valve transmitter and a receiver, guaranteeing a two-way range of 1,500 miles (2,400 km). The equipment and staff were housed in old army huts. Radiotelegrams were received and forwarded to London for the price of 11d per word; the service proved successful and in 1924 a second mast with callsign 'GKU' was added.

By 1926, as experiments with short-wave communications proved successful, Devizes expanded again with the installation of Britain's first short-wave maritime transmitter. Again the service proved successful and the GPO investigated the possibility of expanding the Devizes site again; however, the limited space on the site led the company to open a new station at Portishead, Somerset, and close the Devizes station in 1929. All equipment was removed by 1935.

=== Present use ===
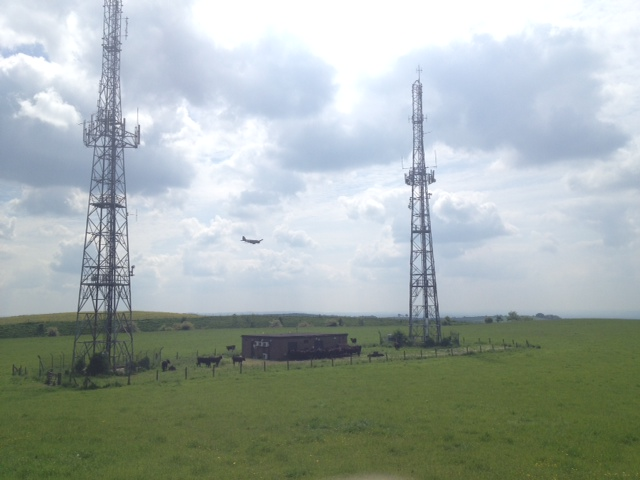
The masts and building presently used at Morgan's Hill

The hill continues to be used for radio communications.

In 1981 Wiltshire Constabulary erected two 46-metre (151 ft) masts and an unmanned equipment building for police radio communication at the peak of the hill, a small distance from previous stations.

In 1990 the Ministry of Defence were granted planning permission for the siting of a mobile prefabricated building, fuel storage, 3 satellite dishes and a developed path from the main road. The plans show this was to be built around the masts operated by the police. However, the MoD's present involvement on the site is unknown.

In 1998 Mercury Communications were granted permission to add four microwave dishes and equipment cabinets to the existing masts. Mercury were a mobile phone network provider who needed more coverage as sales of mobile phones soared. Planning applications from Orange and Vodafone to add mobile phone equipment to the masts also exist.

Signage on the masts and building suggest involvement from three mobile networks – Vodafone, Orange and O2 – as well as Airwave Communications Ltd who administer radio and data technology for all emergency services. However, signage added in 2015 suggests that Arqiva is the owner and operator of the masts.

There is also a small real-time kinematic mast nearby, being used for hydrographic or land survey uses, but its owner or operator is unknown.

== See also ==
- Morgan's Hill Enclosure
- Wansdyke (earthwork)

== Sources ==
- Natural England citation sheet for the site (accessed 17 April 2020)
