= Imperial Wireless Chain =

Radiotelegraphic communications network within the British Empire in the 20th century

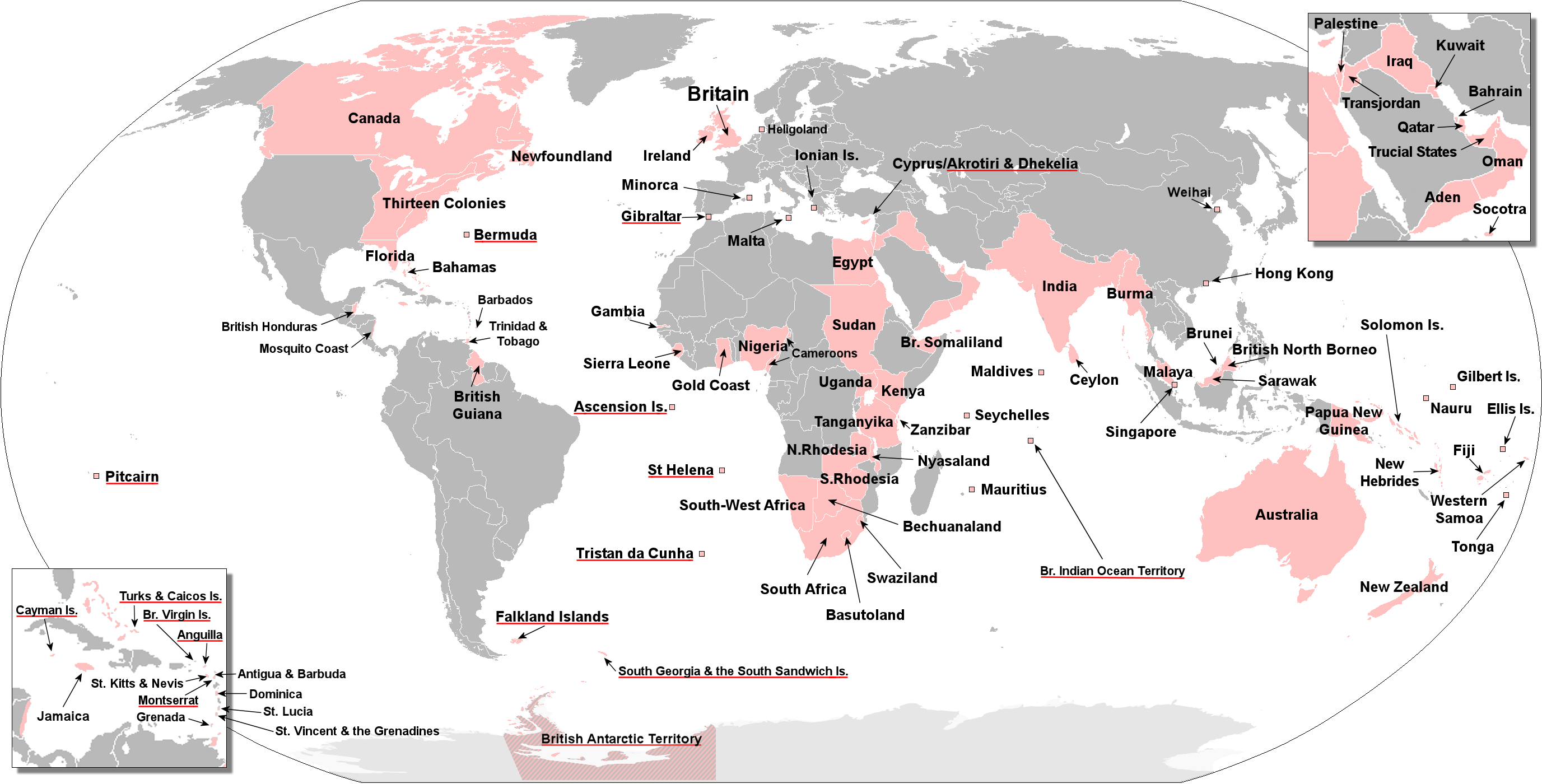
The areas of the world that at one time were part of the British Empire. Current British overseas territories are underlined in red.

The Imperial Wireless Chain was a strategic international communications network of powerful long range radiotelegraphy stations, created by the British government to link the countries of the British Empire. The stations exchanged commercial and diplomatic text message traffic transmitted at high speed by Morse code using paper tape machines. Although the idea was conceived prior to World War I, the United Kingdom was the last of the world's great powers to implement an operational system. The first link in the chain, between Leafield in Oxfordshire and Cairo, Egypt, eventually opened on 24 April 1922, with the final link, between Australia and Canada, opening on 16 June 1928.

== Initial scheme ==
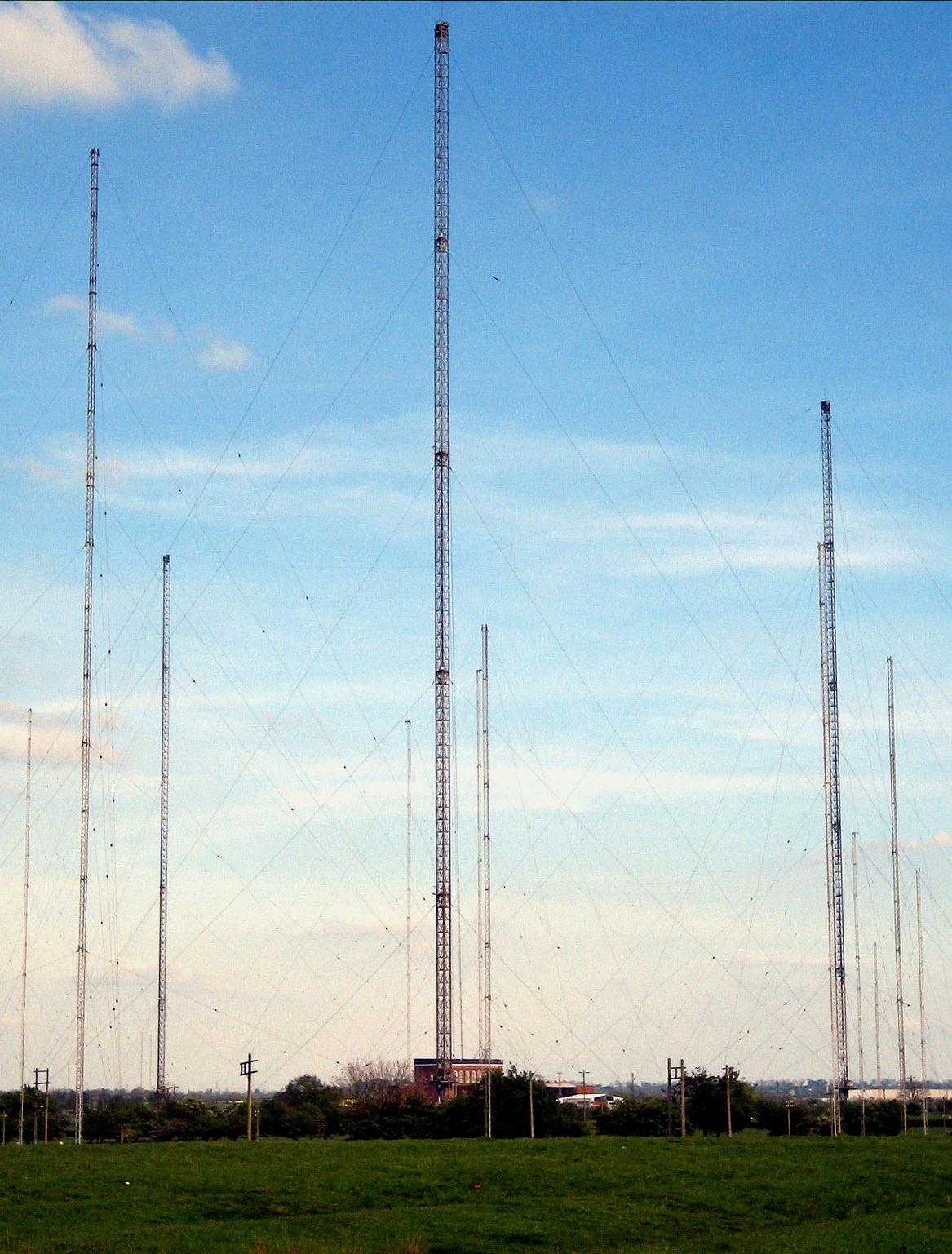
Longwave masts at Rugby's Hillmorton transmitting station (alternative view)

Guglielmo Marconi developed early practical radio transmitters and receivers, and radio began to be used for practical ship-to-shore communication around 1900. His company, the Marconi Wireless Telegraph Company, dominated early radio. In the period leading up to World War I, long distance radiotelegraphy became a strategic defense technology, as it was realized that a nation without radio could be isolated by an enemy cutting its submarine telegraph cables, as indeed happened during the war. Starting around 1908, industrialized nations built global networks of powerful transoceanic wireless telegraphy stations to exchange Morse code telegram traffic with their overseas colonies.

In 1910, the Colonial Office received a formal proposal from the Marconi Company to construct a series of wireless telegraphy stations to link the British Empire within three years. While not then accepted, the Marconi proposal created serious interest in the concept.

A dilemma faced by Britain throughout the negotiations to establish the chain was that Britain owned the largest network of submarine telegraph cables. The proposed stations would directly compete with cables for a fixed amount of transoceanic telegram traffic, reducing the revenue of the cable companies and possibly bankrupting them.

Parliament ruled out the creation of a private monopoly to provide the service and concluded that no government department was in a position to do so, and the Treasury were reluctant to fund the creation of a new department. Contracting the construction to a commercial "wireless company" was the favoured option, and a contract was signed with Marconi's Wireless Telegraph Company in March 1912. The government then found itself facing severe criticism and appointed a select committee to examine the topic. After hearing evidence from the Admiralty, War Office, India Office, and representatives from South Africa, the committee unanimously concluded that a "chain of Imperial wireless stations" should be established as a matter of urgency. An expert committee also advised that Marconi were the only company with technology that was proven to operate reliably over the distances required (in excess of 2,000 miles (3,200 km)) "if rapid installation and immediate and trustworthy communication be desired".

After further negotiations prompted by Treasury pressure, a modified contract was ratified by Parliament on 8 August 1913, with 221 Members of Parliament voting in favour, 140 against. The course of these events was disrupted somewhat by the Marconi scandal, when it was alleged that highly placed members of the governing Liberal party had used their knowledge of the negotiations to indulge in insider trading in Marconi shares. The outbreak of World War I led to the suspension of the contract by the government. Meanwhile Germany successfully constructed its own wireless chain before the war, at a cost equivalent to two million pounds sterling, and was able to use it to its advantage during the conflict.

== Post World War I ==
With the end of the war and the Dominions continuing to apply pressure on the government to provide an "Imperial wireless system", the House of Commons agreed in 1919 that £170,000 should be spent constructing the first two radio stations in the chain, in Oxfordshire (at Leafield) and Egypt (in Cairo), to be completed in early 1920 – although in the event the link opened on 24 April 1922, two months after the UK declared Egypt independent.

Parliament's decision came shortly after legal action initiated by Marconi in June 1919, claiming £7,182,000 in damages from the British government for breach of their July 1912 contract, and in which they were awarded £590,000 by the court. The government also commissioned the "Imperial Wireless Telegraphy Committee" chaired by Sir Henry Norman (the Norman Committee), which reported in 1920. The Norman Report recommended that transmitters should have a range of 2,000 miles, which required relay stations, and that Britain should be connected to Canada, Australia, South Africa, Egypt, India, East Africa, Singapore, and Hong Kong. However, the report was not acted upon. While British politicians procrastinated, Marconi constructed stations for other nations, linking North and South America, as well as China and Japan, in 1922. In January 1922 the British Chambers of Commerce added their voice to the demands for action, adopting a resolution urging the government to urgently resolve the matter, as did other organisations such as the Empire Press Union, which claimed that the Empire was suffering "incalculable loss" in its absence.

Under this pressure, after the 1922 General Election, the Conservative government commissioned the Empire Wireless Committee, chaired by Sir Robert Donald, to "consider and advise upon the policy to be adopted as regards an Imperial wireless service so as to protect and facilitate public interest." Its report was presented to the Postmaster-General on 23 February 1924 The committee's recommendations were similar to those of the Norman Committee – that any stations in the United Kingdom used to communicate with the Empire should be in the hands of the state, that they should be operated by the Post Office, and that eight high-power longwave stations should be used, as well as land-lines. The scheme was estimated at £500,000. At the time the committee was unaware of Marconi's 1923 experiments into shortwave radio transmissions, which offered a much cheaper alternative – although not a commercially proven one – to high-power long-wave transmission system.

Following the Donald Report and discussions with the Dominions, it was decided that the high-power Rugby longwave station (announced on 13 July 1922 by the previous government) would be completed since it used proven technology, in addition to which a number of shortwave "beam stations" would be built (so called because a directional antenna concentrated the radio transmission into a narrow directional beam). The beam stations would communicate with those Dominions that chose the new shortwave technology. Parliament finally approved an agreement between the Post Office and Marconi to build beam stations to communicate with Canada, South Africa, India and Australia, on 1 August 1924.

== Commercial impact ==
From when the Post Office began operating the "Post Office Beam" services, through to 31 March 1929, they had earned gross receipts of £813,100 at a cost of £538,850, leaving a net surplus of £274,250.

Even before the final link became operational between Australia and Canada, it was apparent that the commercial success of the Wireless Chain was threatening the viability of the cable telegraphy companies. An "Imperial Wireless and Cable Conference" was therefore held in London in January 1928, with delegates from the United Kingdom, the self-governing Dominions, India, the Crown Colonies and Protectorates, to "examine the situation which arose as a result of the competition of the Imperial Beam Wireless Services with the cable services of various parts of the empire, to report upon it and to make recommendations with a view to a common policy being adopted by the various governments concerned." It concluded that the cable companies would not be able to compete in an unrestricted market, but that the cable links remained of both commercial and strategic value. It therefore recommended that the cable and wireless interests of the Eastern Telegraph Company, the Eastern Extension, Australasia and China Telegraph Company, Western Telegraph Company and Marconi's Wireless Telegraph Company should be merged to form a single organisation holding a monopolistic position. The merged company would be overseen by an Imperial Advisory Committee, would purchase the government-owned cables in the Pacific, West Indies and Atlantic, and would also be given a lease on the beam stations for a period of 25 years, for the sum of £250,000 per year.

The conference's recommendations were incorporated into the Imperial Telegraphs Act 1929 (5 & 6 Eliz. 2. c. 62), leading to the creation of two new companies on 8 April 1929; an operating company Imperial and International Communications, in turn owned by a holding company named Cable & Wireless Limited. In 1934 Imperial and International Communications was renamed as Cable & Wireless Limited, with Cable and Wireless Limited being renamed as Cable and Wireless (Holding) Limited. From the beginning of April 1928, the beam services were operated by the Post Office as agent for Imperial and International Communications Limited.

== Transfers of ownership ==
The 1930s saw the arrival of the Great Depression, as well as competition from the International Telephone and Telegraph Corporation and affordable airmail. Due to such factors Cable and Wireless were never able to earn the revenue which had been forecast, resulting in low dividends and an inability to reduce the rates charged to customers as much as had been expected. To ease the financial pressure, the British Government finally decided to transfer the beam stations to Cable and Wireless, in exchange for 2,600,000 of the 30,000,000 shares in the company, under the provisions of the Imperial Telegraphs Act 1938. The ownership of the beam stations was reversed in 1947, when the Labour Government nationalised Cable and Wireless, integrating its UK assets with those of the Post Office. By this stage, however, three of the original stations had been closed, after the service was centralised during 1939–1940 at Dorchester and Somerton. The longwave Rugby radio station continued to remain under Post Office ownership throughout.

== Beam stations ==
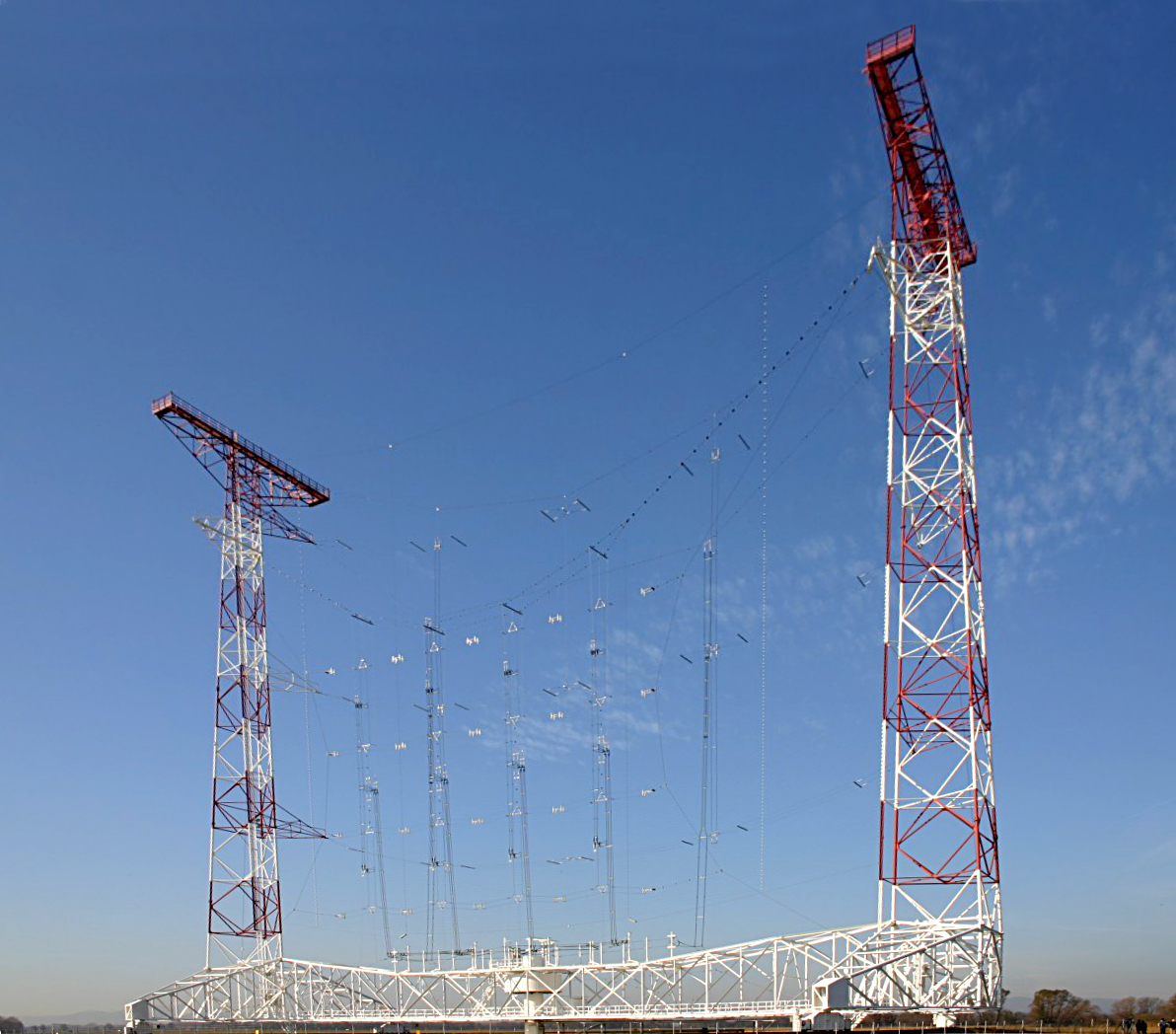
A much smaller, more recent shortwave "curtain antenna" (unconnected with the Imperial Wireless Chain) illustrates the principle

The shortwave Imperial Wireless Chain "beam stations" operated in pairs; one transmitting and one receiving. Pairs of stations were sited at (transmitters first):

- Tetney and Winthorpe (with Ballan and Rockbank in Australia, and with Khadki and Daund in India)
- Ongar and Brentwood
- Dorchester and Somerton
- Bodmin and Bridgwater – the latter actually in the hamlet of Huntworth which is nearer to North Petherton (with Drummondville and Yamachiche in Canada, and with Kliphevel (now Klipheuwel) and Milnerton in South Africa)

At Bodmin and Bridgwater, each aerial stretched to nearly half a mile (800 m) long, and consisted of a row of five 277 feet (84 m) high lattice masts, erected in a line at 640 feet (200 m) intervals and at right angles to the overseas receiving station. These were topped by cross-arm measuring 10 feet (3.0 m) high by 90 feet (27 m) wide, from which the vertical wires of the aerial were hung, forming a "curtain antenna". At Tetney the antenna for India was similar to those at Bodmin and Bridgwater, while the Australian aerial was carried on three 275 feet (84 m) high masts.

Electronic components for the system were built at Marconi's New Street wireless factory in Chelmsford.

Devizes was home to a receiving station until the outbreak of World War I.

== See also ==
- List of Marconi wireless stations
- History of radio
- Telecommunication
