= Portishead Radio =

Former radio station in England

Coordinates: 51°29′14″N 2°46′11″W

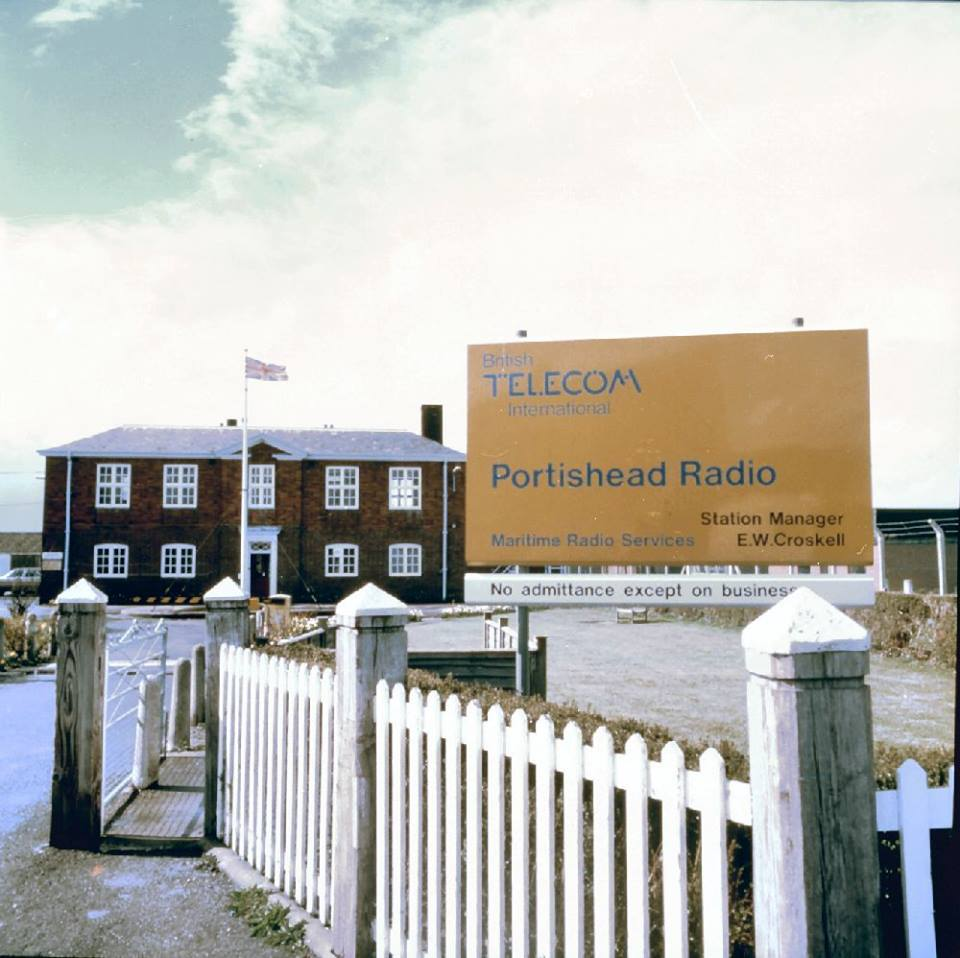
The Portishead Radio receiving station, Highbridge, c.1986

Portishead Radio (callsign GKA) was a radio station in England that provided worldwide maritime communications and long-range aeronautical communications from 1928 until 2000. It was the world's largest and busiest long-distance HF maritime radio station. In 1974, the station employed 154 radio operators who handled over 20 million words per year. It was originally operated by the General Post Office (GPO), then the Post Office (1969–1981), and subsequently by British Telecom, which was privatised in 1984.

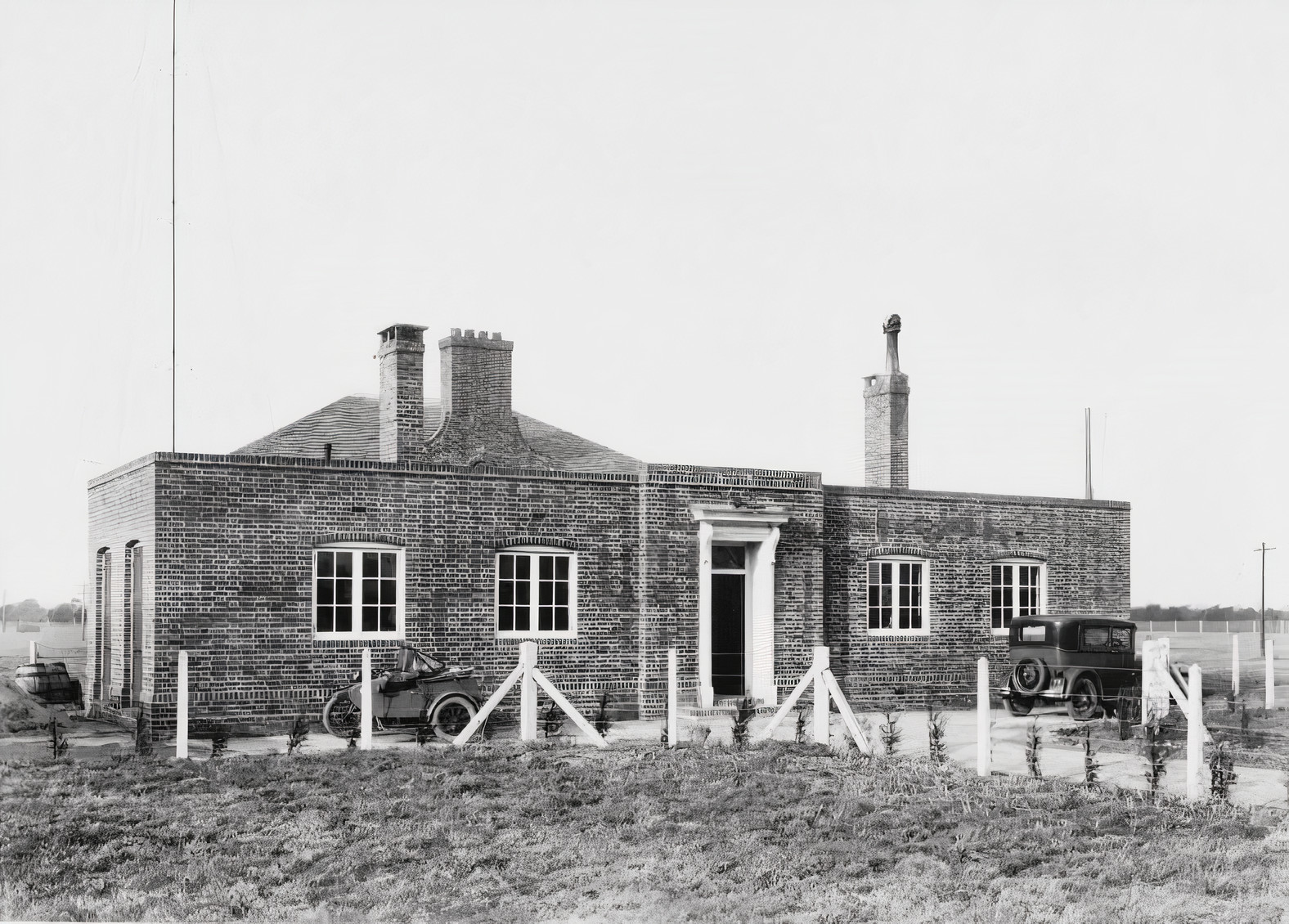
An early photograph of the Highbridge Receiving Station.

== 1920–1939 ==
The UK's long-range maritime service commenced from a site at Morgan's Hill, Devizes, Wiltshire, in 1920. In 1925, a remote receiving centre at Highbridge, near Burnham-on-Sea, Somerset, was opened, and in 1928 a transmitting station was opened at Portishead, from which the name "Portishead Radio" was derived.

The main transmitting station, which was remotely operated from the Highbridge site, originally consisted of a large array of radio masts at nearby Portishead Downs. High-power transmitters for the maritime service were operated from a site at Hillmorton, Rugby. By 1936, the station had a staff of 60 radio officers who handled over 3 million words of radio traffic per year.

== World War II ==
The station played a vital role during World War II in maintaining communications with the British merchant navy and with patrol aircraft in the North Atlantic. During the war, all communications with ships were one-way in order to avoid revealing the ships' locations to the enemy. The station was short-staffed because many staff were on secondments to various government services, such as operating other radio stations and training new radio officers to work in naval convoys. In 1943, the workload was so great that Royal Navy officers and 18 telegraphists were brought in from (amongst others) HMS Flowerdown, a Naval Shore Wireless Service station near Winchester.

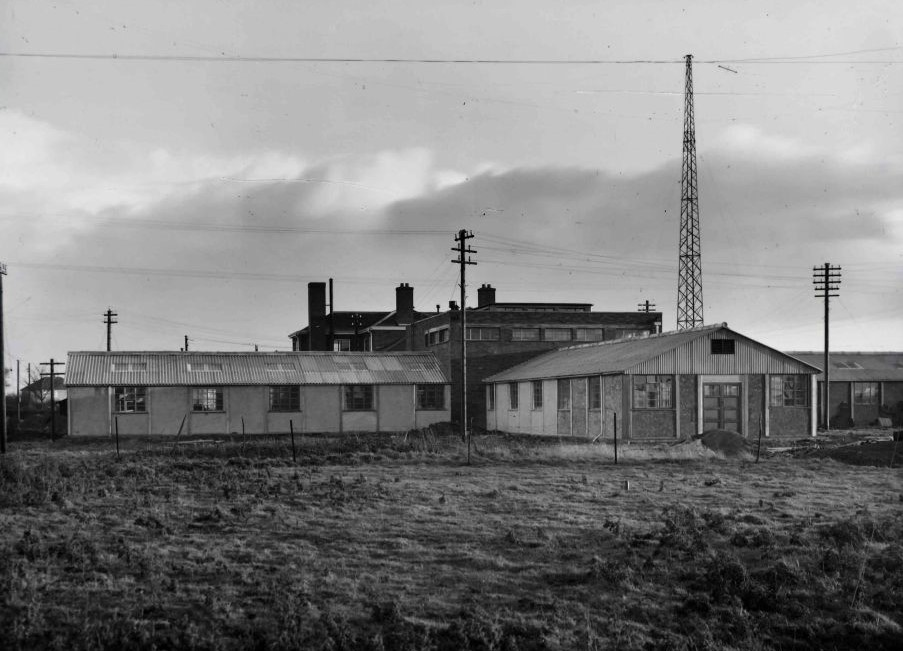
The new station, which opened in 1948.

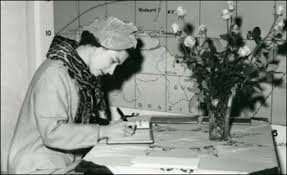
Queen Elizabeth II signing the visitors' book at Portishead Radio, 1958.

== Post-war expansion and decline ==
In 1948, the station was expanded again, adding two operating rooms with 32 new radio operator positions, a broadcasting and landline room, and a file of ship and aircraft positions plotted using magnetic indicators on a 36 by 16 ft steel map of the world. Other maps covered the North Atlantic and Western European areas.

During the 1950s and 1960s there was a steady increase in traffic levels, and the telex-over-radio (TOR) system started operations. By 1965, the station employed 86 radio officers who handled over 11 million words of traffic per year, communicating with on average over 1,000 ships per day. Queen Elizabeth II visited the station in 1958.

By 1974, traffic levels reached over 20 million words per year, handled by 154 radio officers. The rise in traffic was driven by demand from the oil market, the deep-water fishing industry, and the leisure boating market. After the Portishead transmitter site closed in 1978, and Dorchester in 1979, the service – still called Portishead Radio – used transmitters at Rugby (Warwickshire), Leafield (Oxfordshire) and Ongar (Essex).

Competition from satellite communications, beginning with Marisat in 1976 later the Inmarsat network, initially had little effect on the station's business, which continued to expand. Following the division of the Post Office in 1981, the station was operated by British Telecommunications. In 1983, a new control centre was opened, adding new radiotelephone and radiotelegraphy consoles, and an automatic radiotelex facility. The transmitter sites at Leafield and Ongar closed around 1990.

In addition to maritime and aeronautical radio services, the station provided communications facilities for fixed stations worldwide such as relief agencies, emergency and disaster relief companies, and industries where reliable landline communications were poor or non-existent. This was known as the 'Gateway' service and operated from the early 1980s until closure.

In the station's penultimate year to March 1999, there were on average per month 571 radio telegrams, 533 radio telephone calls, and 4,001 radio telex calls.

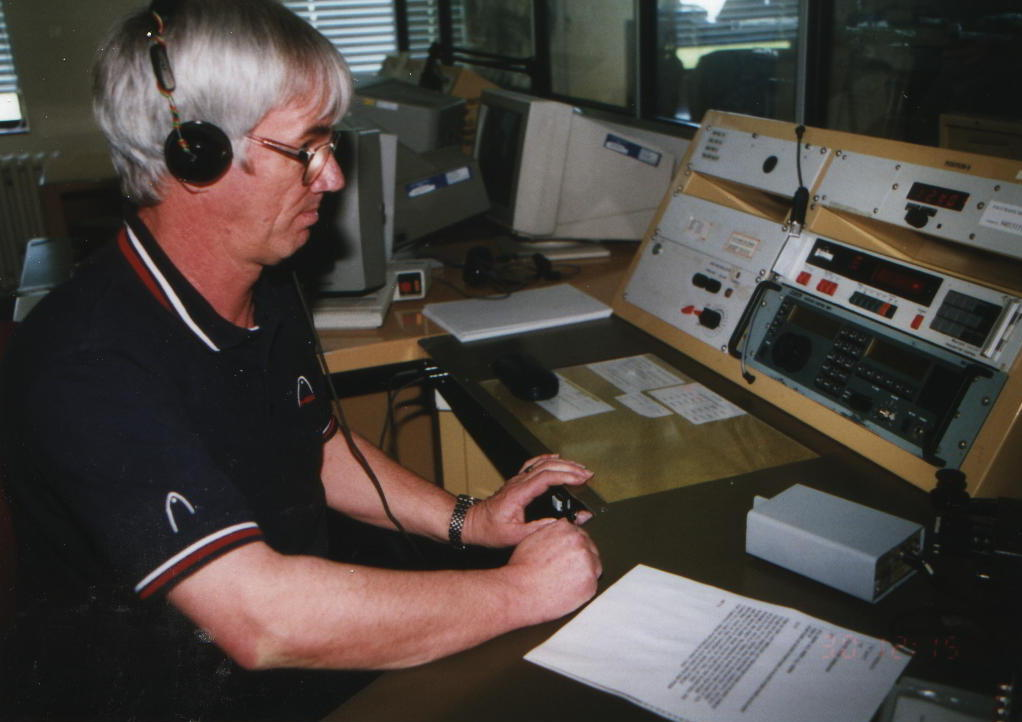
Sending the last transmission from Portishead Radio, 30th April 2000.

== Closure and redevelopment of the site ==
In 1998, British Telecom Maritime Radio Services announced the planned closure of Portishead Radio. The long-range services (HF bands 3–30 MHz) were planned to cease at 12:00 GMT on 30 April 2000. The short-range VHF maritime band (156–174 MHz) services were scheduled to close at the same time, and the medium-range services (MF maritime band 1.6–3.0 MHz) services at 12:00 on 30 June. The station formally closed at 1200 UTC on 30 April 2000.

In September 2004, Sedgemoor District Council adopted a local development plan that proposed the site of Portishead Radio for future housing development. In October 2007, planning permission for a development of 190 houses and flats on the site was granted, and shortly afterwards the radio station buildings were demolished.

In 2007, the buildings at the Highbridge site were demolished to make way for the Mulholland Park housing estate, named after former station manager Don Mulholland and his father Robert, who also worked at the station.

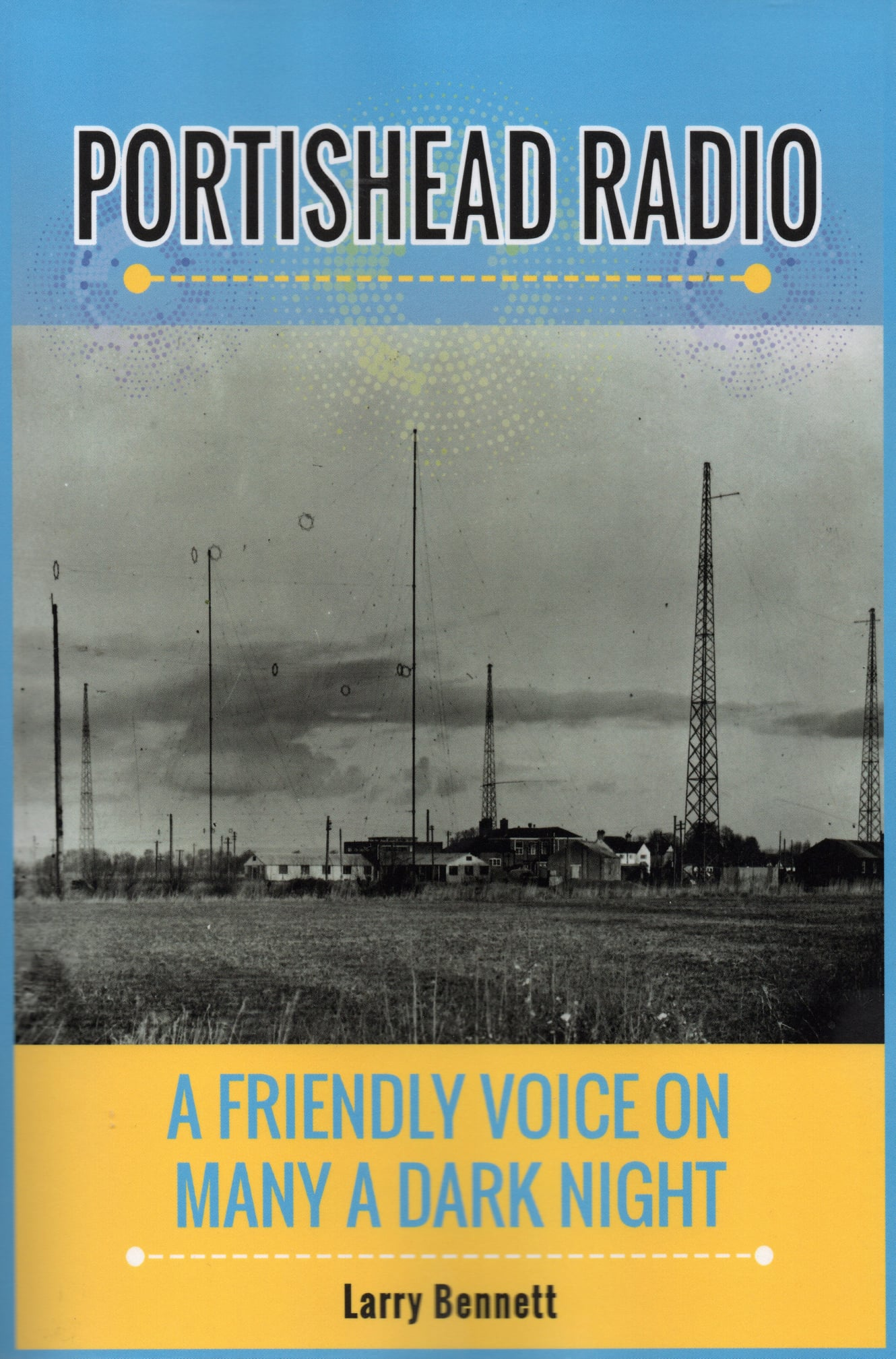
The cover of the 2020 Portishead Radio book.

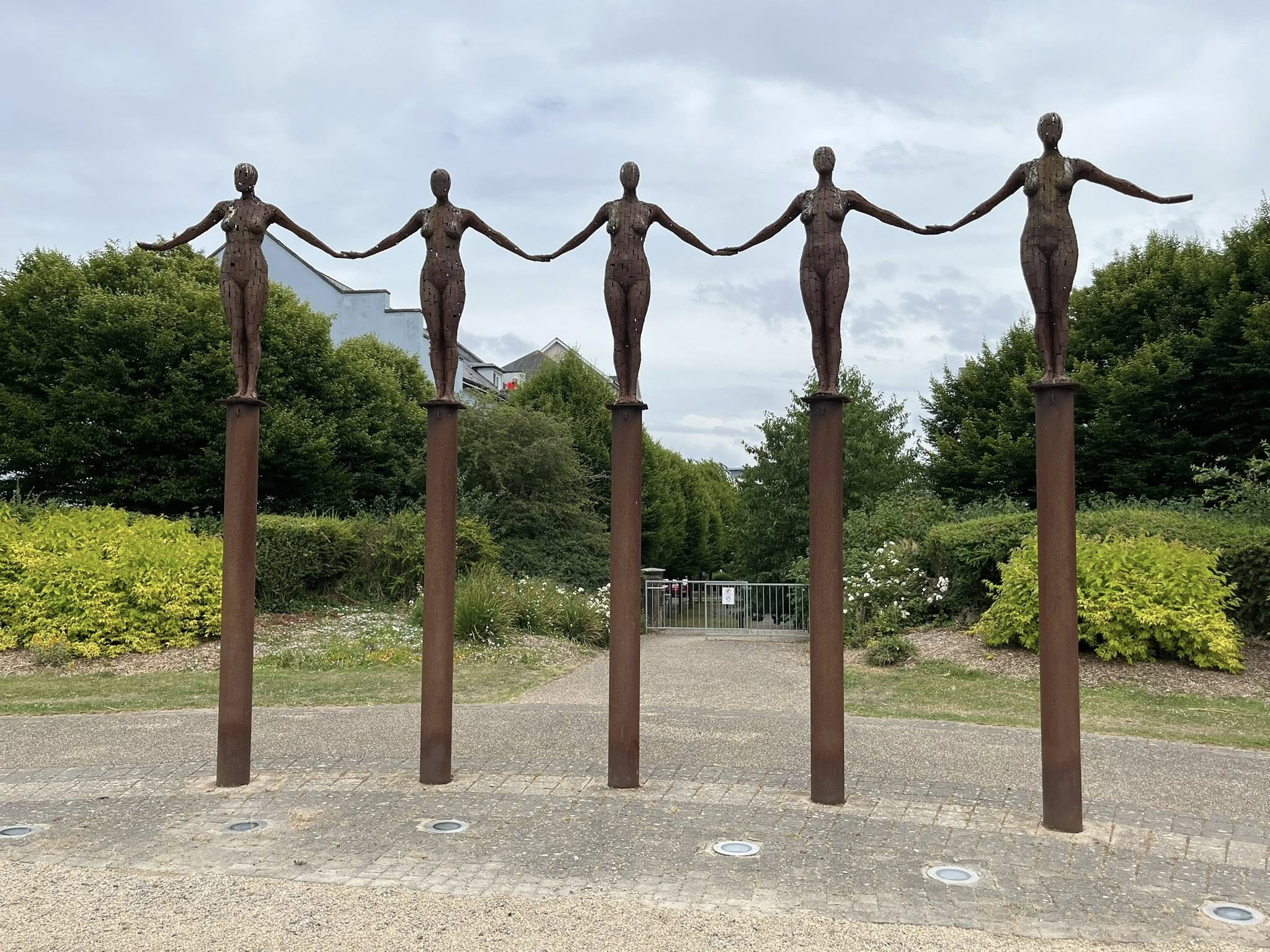
The Arc of Angels, Portishead.

== Commemoration ==
Around 2015, a sculpture by Rick Kirby of five female figures holding hands, titled 'Arc of Angels', was installed close to the Portishead transmitting site to commemorate the five radio towers and their role.

An information board depicting the history of the station and a section of aerial mast are located close to the Portishead Marina.

In 2020, planned celebrations commemorating the 100th anniversary of the long-range maritime service were put on hold due to COVID-19. However, a book on the history of the service was published titled Portishead Radio – A Friendly Voice on Many a Dark Night, and a special amateur radio station GB100GKU was activated, making over 2,500 contacts from 69 countries.

In 2025, a small booklet was issued to commemorate the 100th anniversary of the opening of the Highbridge receiving station.

Efforts continue by former staff members to have the Highbridge receiving station formally acknowledged with a plaque and information board located on the site of the former station.

== See also ==
- Global Maritime Distress and Safety System
