= Maritime Mobile Service Identity =

Digital radio identification code for marine stations

- Acronym: MMSI
- Organization: International Telecommunication Union
- Introduced: 1982 (44 years ago)
- No. of digits: 9
- Example: 311001109

Atlantic Progress, IMO 9190107, Callsign P3QZ8, MMSI 212933000, Hornhaven, Port of Amsterdam.

A Maritime Mobile Service Identity (MMSI) is an assigned Unique identifier (UID), comparable to a maritime object's international maritime telephone number, issued by that object's current flag state (unlike an IMO number, which is a permanent global UID). When the vessel changes ownership or name within the same country of registration then the assigned MMSI remains with the vessel. If the ship is reflagged then the different country’s (flag state) MMSI must be assigned.

An MMSI comprises a series of nine digits, consisting of three Maritime Identification Digits (country-codes), concatenated with a specific identifier. Whenever an object is re-flagged, a new MMSI must be assigned that corresponds with the new state's identity.

A "maritime object" could be anything that requests an MMSI identifier.—e.g., a vessel, fixed offshore installation, mobile unit, maritime aircraft, coast station, etc. Communications may be routed to "individual objects" or to "groups of objects". A group call to objects can be based on an object's locale, owner/operator/fleet, type, etc. or combinations thereof.

MMSI's are formed in such a way that the identity or part thereof can be used by telephone and telex subscribers connected to the general telecommunications network to call any of these objects automatically. Communications are sent in digital form over a radio frequency channel.

== Types ==
As of 2024, there are six kinds of maritime mobile service identities:

- Ship station identities
- Group ship station identities
- Coast station identities
- Group coast station identities
- SAR aircraft
- Navigational aids, and craft associated with a parent ship

== Maritime identification digits (MID) ==
An MID consists of three digits, always starting with a number from 2 to 7 (assigned regionally by continent) that indicates the specific flag state / country in which the station is registered. A second MID can be assigned once the first or subsequently allocated MID is more than 80% exhausted, and the rate of assignments is such that 90% exhaustion is foreseen. A listing of MIDs assigned to each country can be found in Table 1 of ITU Radio Regulations Appendix 43.

== The first digit of an MMSI ==
The initial digits of an MMSI categorize the identity, as defined in by Recommendation M.585. The meaning of the first digit is:

- 0 Ship group, coast station, or group of coast stations
- 1 For use by SAR aircraft (111MIDaxx) (Note: The seventh digit ("a") may, but does not have to, designate where the aircraft is fixed-wing (a = 1) or a helicopter (a = 5) if desired. The "a" digit can also simply be used like the other "x" digits if the distinction is not desired.)
- 2-7 MMSI's used by individual ships, beginning with an MID:
  - 2 Europe (e.g., Italy has MID 247; Denmark has MIDs 219 and 220)
  - 3 North and Central America and Caribbean (e.g., Canada, 316; Greenland, 331; Panama, 351 through 357, plus 370 through 373; United States, 303(Alaska), 338(domestic), plus 366 through 369)
  - 4 Asia (not the southeast) (e.g., PRC, 412, 413, and 414; Maldives, 455; Japan, 431)
  - 5 Oceania (Australia, 503; New Zealand, 512), and Southeast Asia (Philippines, 548; Indonesia, 525)
  - 6 Africa (Eritrea, 625)
  - 7 South America (Peru, 760)
- 8 Handheld VHF transceiver with DSC and GNSS
- 9 Devices using a free-form number identity:
  - Search and Rescue Transponders (970yyzzzz) (Note: Where "yy" is a numeric ID assigned to a manufacturer, and "zzzz" is a sequence number chosen by that manufacturer.) (Note: Manufacturer IDs / codes are assigned by Comité International Radio-Maritime (CIRM), the International Association for Marine Electronics Companies, as delegated by the ITU.)
  - Man overboard DSC and/or AIS devices (972yyzzzz)
  - 406 MHz EPIRBs fitted with an AIS transmitter (974yyzzzz)
  - craft associated with a parent ship (98MIDxxxx) (Note: The devices that use these MMSIs may be located in lifeboats, life-rafts, rescue-boats, etc.)
  - navigational aids (AtoNs; 99MIDaxxx) (Note: The "a" digit may be used to designate the type of AtoN: 1 for physical, 6 for virtual. The "a" digit can also simply be used like the other "x" digits if the distinction is not desired.)

== Station Identity Formats ==
=== Ship station identities ===
The 9-digit code constituting a ship station identity is formed as follows:

MIDxxxxxx

where MID represent the Maritime Identification Digits and X is any figure from 0 to 9. If the ship is fitted with an Inmarsat B, C or M ship earth station, or it is expected to be so equipped in the foreseeable future, then the identity should have three trailing zeros:

MIDxxx000

If the ship is fitted with an Inmarsat C ship earth station, or it is expected to be so equipped in the foreseeable future, then the identity could have one trailing zero:

MIDxxxxx0

If the ship is fitted with an Inmarsat A ship earth station, or has satellite equipment other than Inmarsat, then the identity needs no trailing zero.

=== Group ship station call identities ===
Group ship station call identities for calling simultaneously more than one ship are formed as follows:

0MIDxxxxx

where the first figure is zero, and X is any figure from 0 to 9. The particular MID represents only the country assigning the group ship station call identity and so does not prevent group calls to fleets containing more than one ship nationality.

==== Coast station identities ====
Coast station identities are formed as follows:

00MIDxxxx

where the first two figures are zeros, and X is any figure from 0 to 9. The MID reflects the country in which the coast station or coast earth station is located.

==== Group coast station call identities ====
Group coast station call identities for calling simultaneously more than one coast station have the same format as individual coast station IDs: two leading zeros, the MID, and the four digits. They are formed as a subset of coast station identities, as follows:

00MID0000 for any coast station using the MID
009990000 for any VHF coast station (regardless of MID)

US Coast Guard stations use a non-standard MMSI: 003669999 - any US Coast Guard Base station Note that administrations in other countries may use different formats.

Reference: ITU-R Recommendations M.585-10

==== Search and Rescue Transmitter ====
AIS Search and Rescue Transmitters (AIS-SART) have an identifier related to the manufacturer, rather than a country's MID:

970YYxxxx

The digitals represented by the two Y characters are assigned by the International Association for Marine Electronics Companies and refer to the SART manufacturer, while the Xs are sequential digits assigned by the manufacturer identifying the SART.

=== Federal US MMSIs ===
In the United States (one of whose MIDs is 366), federal MMSIs are assigned by the National Telecommunications and Information Administration and are normally (but not always) formed as 3669xxxxx. Non-federal MMSIs are assigned by the Federal Communications Commission normally as part of the ship station license application and are formed as 366xxx000 for ships on international voyages and ships needing an Inmarsat mobile earth station, or 366xxxxx0 for all other ships.

The United States Coast Guard group ship station call identity is 036699999, and the group coast station call identity is 003669999.

In the U.S., MMSIs are primarily used for digital selective calling and for assigning Inmarsat identities.

== Exhaustion of MMSIs ==
Because all ships on international voyages, as well as all ships fitted with an Inmarsat B or M ship earth station, are assigned MMSIs of the format MIDxxx000, a serious problem has arisen internationally in assigning sufficient numbers of MIDs to all administrations that need them. For example, a country having 10,000 Inmarsat-equipped ships would require 10 MIDs just to accommodate those 10,000 ships. If 50,000 boaters decided to fit small Inmarsat M terminals, 50 additional MIDs would be required to accommodate them.

The problem exists with Inmarsat-equipped ships because ITU-T recommendations require that Inmarsat ship earth stations be assigned the identity (MESIN) TMIDxxxYY, where T indicates the type of Inmarsat station, YY indicates the Inmarsat station extension (e.g."00" might indicate a telephone in the bridge, "01" might indicate a fax machine in the radio room, etc.), and MIDxxx indicates the ship station number, which relates to the assigned ship station identity MIDxxx000.

The MMSI was meant to be an all-inclusive ship electronic identity, used in one form or another by every GMDSS or telecommunications instrument on the ship. Questions have been raised, however, whether the MMSI can in practice totally fulfill that role. ITU may eventually end the practice of relating Inmarsat MESIN identities with the ship MMSI identity.

To help mitigate against MMSI number exhaustion, manufacturers are required to cripple DSC-capable radios so that an MMSI number can only be entered once, which means that a device owner may not move the radio from one boat to another. This is especially egregious for hand-held VHF devices, for which a single MMSI number makes little sense.

The World Radio Conference, Geneva, 1997 (WRC-97), adopted Resolution 344 concerning the exhaustion of the maritime mobile service identity resource. In view of improvements to public switched telephone networks, and new capabilities of the Inmarsat system other than Inmarsat B or M, previous restrictions should no longer be applicable. All nine digits of the MMSI can be used in such cases, and no longer need to end in trailing zeros.

== See also ==
- Automatic Identification System uses MMSI codegroups for ship ID
- Global Maritime Distress Safety System
- Inmarsat and the International Mobile Satellite Organization (IMSO)
- Maritime call sign, not tied to MMSI but can contain MMSI after
- SOLAS Convention a global Maritime Safety Convention
