= Baltic Compass =

Baltic Compass is a transnational project which aims to reinforce connection between landuse, environment and agriculture, leading to healthier ecosystems and a more competitive Baltic Sea region. The name Baltic Compass comes from the letters from the whole name of the project: Comprehensive Policy Actions and Investments in Sustainable Solutions in Agriculture in the Baltic Sea Region.

== From blooming Baltic Sea to a blooming Baltic Region ==
Baltic Compass aims to find ways how the agricultural sector in the Baltic Sea Region can produce the daily food required by the region’s 90 million inhabitants and at the same time preserve the Baltic Sea. The large catchment area and the shallowness and enclosedness of the Baltic Sea make it very vulnerable. The Baltic Sea has 9 riparian countries and therefore close international cooperation as well as sectoral cooperation is needed in order to move towards healthier ecosystems in the whole Baltic Sea Region. Baltic Compass aims to reduce euthrophication through transnational approach, by increasing cooperation between the environmental and agricultural sectors in the Baltic Sea region.

== Project background ==
Baltic Compass is a Pan Baltic project with the 22 partners. They represent national authorities, interest organizations and innovation centres in Belarus, Denmark, Estonia, Finland, Germany, Latvia, Lithuania, Poland, Sweden and Russia (associated partner). Baltic Compass will thus function as a regional platform where participants and stakeholders can develop more efficient agro-environmental policies, share innovations and best practises, create scientific scenarios and facilitate investments. Baltic Compass fosters win-win solutions for agriculture and environment and thus leads to more sustainable rural economies.

The expectations on Baltic Compass is to contribute with sharing of practical solutions and innovations (web portal), business and investment facilitation (advice and networking), strategic risk assessment concerned with land use and animal husbandry (science and scenarios) and the policy adaptation required (political and ministerial level dialogue). The concrete benefit for the farmers will be better access to decision support when investing for future businesses in the sensitive Baltic ecosystems – independently in which Baltic Sea Region country.

Baltic Compass is regarded as a strategic level project by the financier the Baltic Sea Region Programme 2007-2013 for its contributions to investments and policy environments. The project will in a practical manner encompass the political ideas of the HELCOM Baltic Sea Action Plan and the EU Strategy for the Baltic Sea Region. Baltic Compass will run from December 2009 to December 2012.
