= Long Range Certificate =

The Long Range Certificate is an internationally valid certificate issued to radio station operators. It entitles the holder to participate in marine communications on leisure crafts using Marine VHF, Medium Frequency, High Frequency radios and Inmarsat satellite communication as agreed in Global Maritime Distress and Safety System.

The certificate is consistent with the agreement of the Article S47 of the ITU Radio Regulations.

== Issuing authorities ==
Depending on local legislation, the certificate can be issued e.g. by a maritime association such as the AMERC in the UK, or a regulatory agency such as FICORA in Finland.

== Course and Exam (UK) ==
The Long Range Certificate Training course takes four days including the exam on the final day.

The course includes Voice procedures/radio telephony, GMDSS logbook, VHF, MF, HF, Navtex, EPIRB, SART, Batteries, Fuses, Antennas and Hand Held VHF

There are three sections to the exam;

- Radio Telephony (RT) Exercise. Each candidate responds to a distress scenario by voice using the correct phrases and has to log the entire scenario
- Written Paper- 2 long questions and 12 multiple choice questions
- Operational Performance Test. Demonstrate practical use of all equipment that is covered on the course.

== See also ==
- Short Range Certificate
