= Ramark =

Type of radar beacon

A ramark, syllabic acronym for radar marker, was a type of radar beacon used to mark maritime navigational hazards. Ramarks are no longer in use.

Ramarks are a non-directional, continuously transmitting radar beacon which indicate the bearing to a navigational hazard when viewed on a radar plan position indicator (PPI) display. Some ramarks transmit a unique set of Morse characters, which are visible on the PPI display as dots and dashes along the bearing of the ramark.

Ramarks are no longer used in the United States. They have been phased out in favor of more advanced racons (radar beacons) which indicate both the location and the bearing of the hazard.
