= Search and rescue transponder =

Transponder intended for emergency use at sea

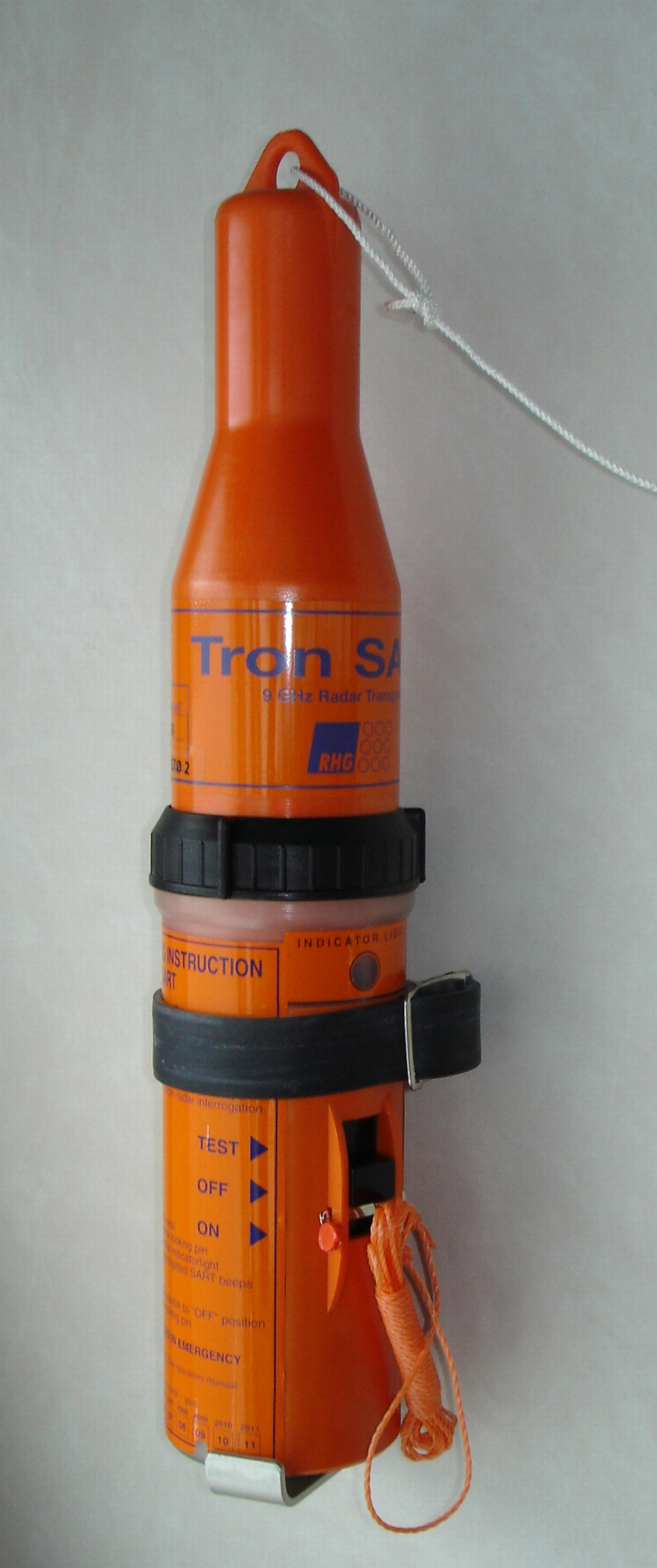
A standard SART 9 GHz radar transponder, produced by Jotron, on board a Norwegian ferry. The unit is 251 mm high.

A search and rescue radar transponder (SART) is a self-contained, waterproof transponder intended for emergency use at sea. These devices may be either a radar-SART, or a GPS-based AIS-SART (automatic identification system SART).

The radar-SART is used to locate a survival craft or distressed vessel by creating a series of dots on a rescuing ship's radar display. A SART will only respond to a 9 GHz X-band (3 cm wavelength) radar. It will not be seen on S-band (10 cm) or other radar. Shipboard Global Maritime Distress Safety System (GMDSS) include one or more search and rescue locating devices. The radar-SART may be triggered by any X-band radar within a range of approximately 8 nautical miles (15 km). Each radar pulse received causes the SART to transmit a response which is swept repetitively across the complete radar frequency band. When interrogated, it first sweeps rapidly (0.4 microsecond) through the band before beginning a relatively slow sweep (7.5 microseconds) through the band back to the starting frequency. This process is repeated for a total of twelve complete cycles. At some point in each sweep, the radar-SART frequency will match that of the interrogating radar and be within the passband of the radar receiver. If the radar-SART is within range, the frequency match during each of the 12 slow sweeps will produce a response on the radar display, thus a line of 12 dots equally spaced by about 0.64 nautical miles (1.19 km) will be shown. When the range to the radar-SART is reduced to about 1 nautical mile (1.9 km), the radar display may show also the 12 responses generated during the fast sweeps. These additional dot responses, which also are equally spaced by 0.64 nautical miles (1.19 km), will be interspersed with the original line of 12 dots. They will appear stronger and larger the closer the interrogating radar gets, slowly becoming arcs at first until the SART is within 1NM, the arcs will become full circles indicating the active SART is in the general area.

SARTs are typically cylindrical, about the size of a person's forearm, and brightly coloured.

== See also ==
- AIS-SART
- Civil Air Patrol (US Air Force Auxiliary)
- Emergency position-indicating radio beacon (EPIRB)
- Marine VHF radio
- Racon
- Emergency locator beacon

== Sources ==
- IMO Sub-Committee on Safety of Navigation, Operation of Marine Radar for SART Detection, SN/Circ. 197
