= AIS-SART =

Radio transmitter which sends a location signal

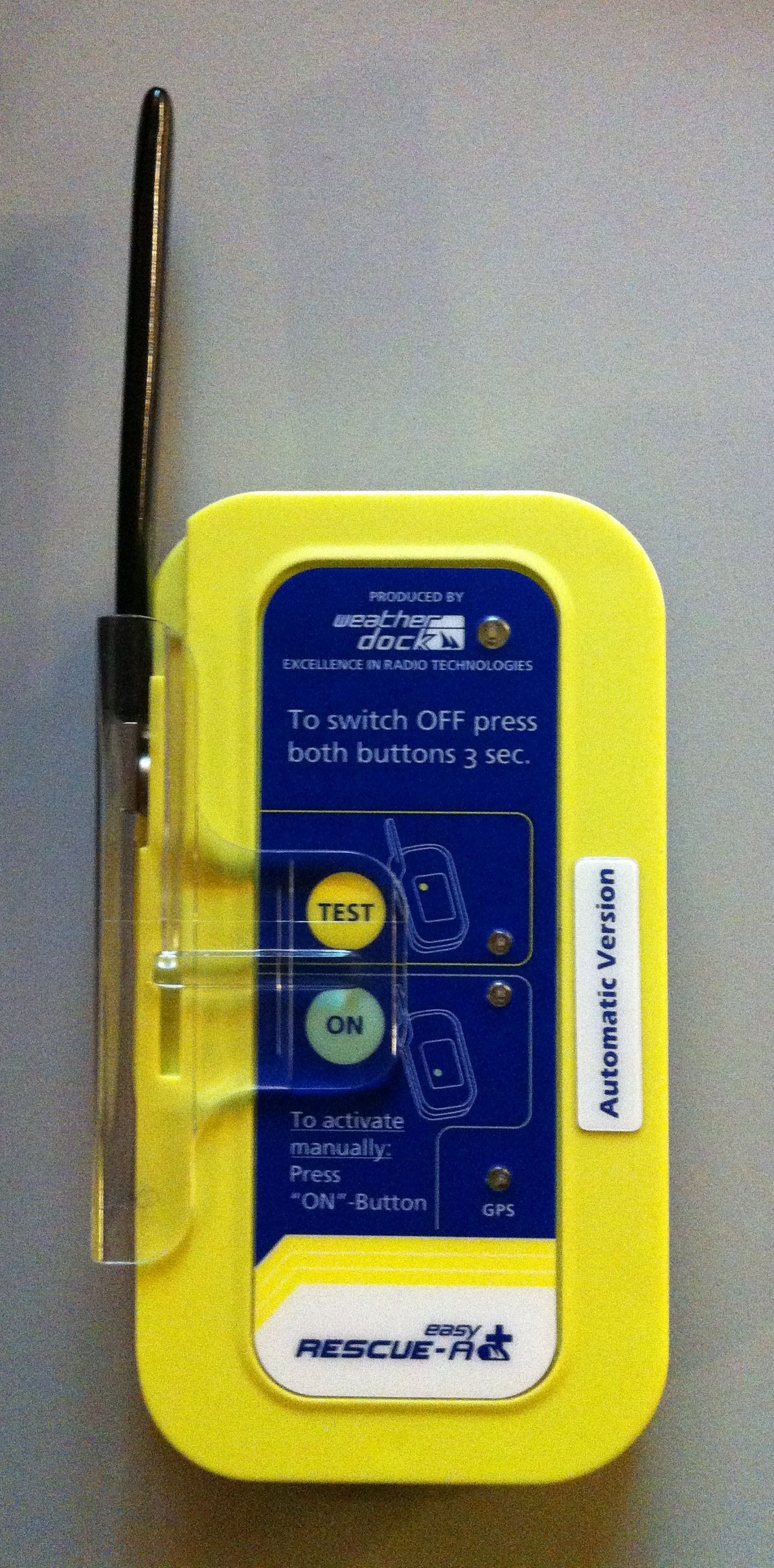
An AIS-SART made by German company WeatherDock AG

An AIS-SART is a self-contained radio device used to locate a survival craft or distressed vessel by sending updated position reports using a standard Automatic Identification System (AIS) class-A position report. The position and time synchronization of the AIS-SART are derived from a built in GNSS receiver (e.g. GPS). Shipboard Global Maritime Distress Safety System (GMDSS) installations include one or more search and rescue locating devices. These devices may be either an AIS-SART (AIS Search and Rescue Transmitter) (from January 1, 2010), or a radar-SART (Search and Rescue Transponder).

The AIS-SART derives position and time synchronization from a built in GNSS receiver. Once per minute, the position is sent as a series of eight identical position report messages (four on 161.975 MHz and four on 162.025 MHz). This scheme creates a high probability that at least one of the messages is sent on the highest point of a wave.

AIS SARTs are typically cylindrical and brightly colored. A typical model is 251 mm (about 10 inches) high and weighs 450g (about a pound).

The specification (IEC 61097-14 Ed 1.0) for AIS-SART was developed by the IEC's TC80 AIS work group. AIS-SART was added to the GMDSS regulations effective January 1, 2010.

== See also ==
- Automatic identification system
- Civil Air Patrol (US Air Force Auxiliary)
- Emergency locator beacon
- Emergency position-indicating radio beacon (EPIRB)
- Global Maritime Distress Safety System
- Long-range identification and tracking (LRIT)
- Marine VHF radio
