= Leafield Technical Centre =

Motorsport facility in Oxfordshire, England

Coordinates: 51.837°N 1.563°W

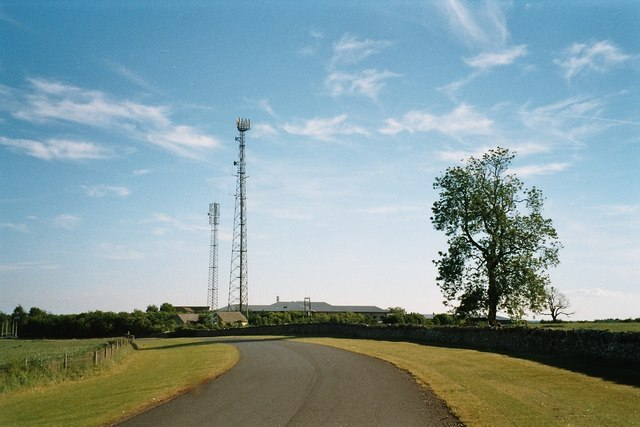
The approach to the buildings in 2006

Leafield Technical Centre is a former radio communications station, now a motorsports centre of excellence, in the hamlet of Langley, in the western part of the village of Leafield in Oxfordshire, England.

== Radio communications station ==
Experimental radio transmissions were begun on Crown Estate land at Leafield in 1912 by the Marconi Company on behalf of the General Post Office (GPO). From 1922 the site was the first link in the Imperial Wireless Chain, passing messages to and from Egypt which were priced per word. The station's aerials were strung from thirteen 305-foot (93 m) masts and it had its own coal-fired electricity generation. At some point after World War II the station became part of the GPO's Portishead Radio service, communicating with vessels at sea.

The station was rebuilt in 1961–1962 at a cost of £1 million, with 80 masts 180 feet (55 m) high. The GPO also built a training college for apprentice engineers, at first with a 50-bed residential wing. After most maritime traffic switched to satellite communication, the radio station was closed in 1986.

== British Telecom training college ==
Much of the site was returned to the Crown but in 1988 British Telecom (successor to the GPO) purchased the central buildings and 12.5 acres (5.1 ha). The training college was enlarged in the following years, in part through re-use of the radio station's buildings. Rationalisation within BT led to closure of the college in 1994.

== Motorsport ==
Sold to a commercial property company, the site was then leased by Tom Walkinshaw Racing (TWR) as a motorsport development centre for the Arrows Formula One team, until the team's demise in the 2002 season. Leafield Technical Centre later became the headquarters of the Super Aguri F1 team, following the team's formation ahead of the 2006 season. Super Aguri remained at the site until folding during the 2008 season. The site was sold to Formtech GmbH as part of their purchase of the Super Aguri team assets.

From 2003, motorsport powertrain specialist Menard Competition Technologies also maintained offices and workshops at the site. Throughout the later half of the decade to 2010, this engineering company (including some key engineers from the engine department of Tom Walkinshaw Racing) traded from Leafield and also a second site housing engine dynamometers at Kidlington. They completed design / build engine projects including the V12 engine for Superleague Formula, and engines for Norton Motorcycles' range of Commando 961 models from 2009. The company traded until 2011 and was formally dissolved in 2014.

In 2012, the Caterham F1 team moved to the vacant Leafield site from their original base at Hingham, Norfolk. In April 2014, a fire at the site led to seven employees of Caterham F1 being hospitalized. The team went into administration at the end of the 2014 Formula One season.

== Future use ==
After Caterham declared bankruptcy in early 2015, Leafield Technical Centre was abandoned and put up for sale. In early 2020, it was reported that the site had been heavily vandalized during the five-year period of abandonment.

In 2023, holiday accommodation developer Cabu was granted planning permission for partial demolition and redevelopment of the site with holiday cabins, entertainment, and spa facilities.
