= Baltic Sea Region Programme =

The Baltic Sea Region Programme 2007–2013 (alias INTERREG IV B programme for the Baltic Sea region) is a support programme part-financed by the European Union and Norway. It is one of the mainstream Structural Funds programmes under the European Community's territorial co-operation objective. The Programme will support transnational projects working together for balanced and sustainable development of the European territory.

== Co-operation area ==
The eligible co-operation area includes EU member states Denmark, Estonia, Finland, Latvia, Lithuania, Poland, Sweden and northern parts of Germany, as well as the neighbouring countries of Norway, north-west regions of Russia and Belarus.

== Objectives ==
Strategic objective of the programme is to make the Baltic Sea region an attractive place to invest, work and live in.

Project partners (public or public-like institutions) form partnerships to look for joint solutions to common problems & challenges. The projects will contribute to the following priorities:

- Fostering innovations
- Internal and external accessibility
- Baltic Sea as a common resource
- Attractive and competitive cities and regions

== BalticClimate ==
BalticClimate is the acronym for the project "Baltic Challenges and Chances for local and regional development generated by Climate Change". It was approved in October 2008 in the first Call of the "Baltic Sea Region Programme 2007–2013", a programme financed from the European Regional Development Fund (ERDF), the European Neighbourhood and Partnership Instrument (ENPI), the Norwegian national funding as well as by own contributions (co-financing) by the project partner institutions. The lead partner of BalticClimate is the Academy for Spatial Research and Planning (ARL)/ Germany.

Within the project lifetime of November 2008 until April 2012 BalticClimate was implemented by twenty-three official project partner institutions and sixteen associated organisations from eight countries (Estonia, Germany, Finland, Latvia, Lithuania, Poland, Russia, Sweden). The project focused on supporting regions, municipalities as well as cities in the Baltic Sea Region to pro-actively deal with the issue of climate change.

== BSR Innoship ==
BSR InnoShip is a project that seeks to increase cooperation among the countries of the Baltic Sea Region to reduce ship and port emissions, and increase competitiveness in the marine industry. It is an environmentalist project led by the Baltic Institute of Finland. The project's aims are in line with the International Maritime Organization's recommendations to reduce sulphur oxide (SOx) and nitrogen oxide (NOx) emissions from ships in the Baltic Sea progressively by 2015. These two oxides are the main cause of eutrophication, which is an environmental effect that limits water nutrients and endangers sea life. The new Tier III for NOx emission standard's goal is 80% lower in comparison with Tier I, whereas marine fuel cannot exceed SOx level of 0.1% which should be enough to revert the current situation of the Baltic Sea Region by 2040.

BSR InnoShip is financed by Interreg's Baltic Sea Region Programme.

== See also ==
- Baltic Compass
- Interreg
