= International Convention on Maritime Search and Rescue =

Maritime safety convention

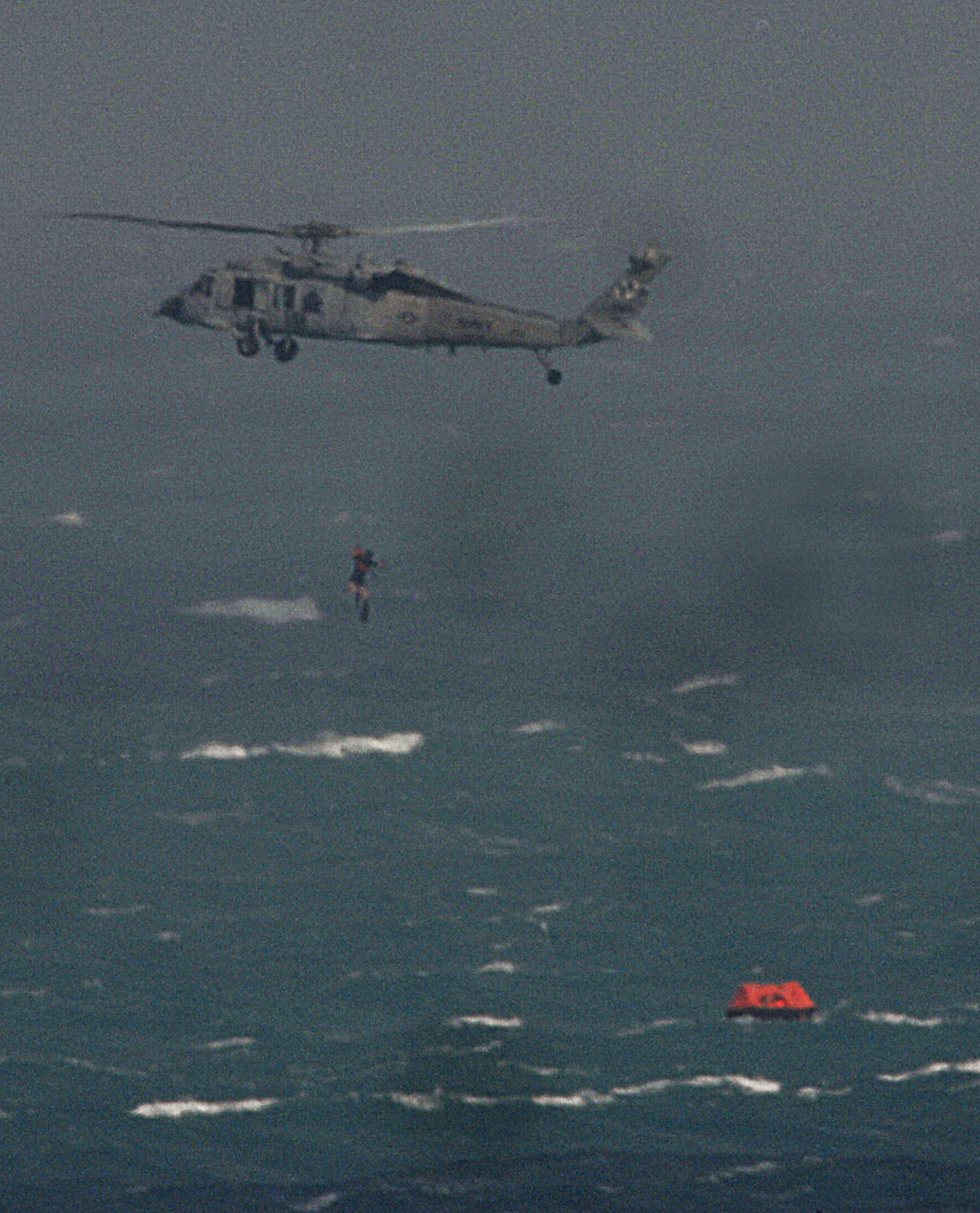
The SAR Convention covers search and rescue at sea, as seen here in the rescue of shipwrecked survivors

The International Convention on Maritime Search and Rescue (SAR Convention) is a maritime safety convention of the International Maritime Organization. It entered into force on 22 June 1985. The convention forms part of the legal framework covering search and rescue at sea.

The SAR Convention was adopted on 27 April 1979. It entered into force on 22 June 1985.

The convention has been amended by IMO resolutions MSC.70(69) and MSC.155(78). These amendments were made in 1998 and in 2004 respectively.

== Content ==
The SAR Convention covers coordinated Search and rescue at sea, including the organisation of Air-sea rescue services. The aim of the convention was to ensure agreed, standardised procedures for SAR around the world.

It establishes SAR regions (SARR) to allow coastal States to coordinate SAR provision. This includes the establishment of 13 distinct SAR areas of the world's oceans.

It also sets out the establishment of Rescue coordination centres around the world to control SAR operations.

== Ratification ==
As of October 2022, 114 countries were party to the convention.
