= International distress frequency =

Radio frequency designated for emergency communication

An international distress frequency is a radio frequency that is designated by the International Telecommunications Union or other international organization for emergency radio communication by treaty or agreement. Use of some distress frequencies is permitted for calling other stations to establish contact, whereupon the stations move to another frequency. Such channels are known as distress, safety and calling frequencies.

== History ==
For much of the 20th century, 500 kHz was the primary international distress frequency. Its use has been phased out in favor of the Global Maritime Distress and Safety System (GMDSS).

== Maritime Mobile Service frequencies ==
- 2182 kHz is the Medium Frequency maritime Single Sideband voice calling and distress frequency. Maritime Rescue Coordination Centres (MRCC) utilize this frequency. The United States Coast Guard no longer monitors 2182 kHz.
- Several HF maritime voice frequencies exist for use on the high seas:
  - 4125 KHz
  - 6215 KHz
  - 8291 KHz
  - 12290 KHz
  - 16420 KHz
- 156.800 MHz is for short range Marine VHF radio use.
- 406 MHz to 406.1 MHz is used by the Cospas-Sarsat international satellite-based search and rescue (SAR) distress alert detection and information distribution system.

=== Digital selective calling frequencies ===
Several maritime frequencies are used for digital selective calling (DSC), and they are also monitored for DSC distress signals:

- 2.1875 MHz
- 4.2075 MHz
- 6.312 MHz
- 8.4145 MHz
- 12.577 MHz
- 16.8045 MHz
- 156.525 MHz, Marine VHF radio Channel 70

== Aeronautical frequencies ==
- 121.5 MHz is the civilian aircraft emergency frequency or International Air Distress frequency and 243 MHz for NATO military aircraft emergency frequencies It is used by some civilian emergency locator beacons; however, the Cospas-Sarsat system no longer monitors the frequency. Satellite processing from all 121.5 or 243 MHz locators has been discontinued. Since February 1, 2009, the U.S. Coast Guard only monitors distress signals from emergency position indicating radio beacons (EPIRBs) that broadcast using digital 406 MHz signals. Digital 406 MHz models became the only ones approved for use in both commercial and recreational watercraft worldwide on January 1, 2007.
- 406 MHz to 406.1 MHz is used by the Cospas-Sarsat international satellite-based search and rescue (SAR) distress alert detection and information distribution system

== Search And Rescue frequencies ==
- 123.1 MHz – Aeronautical Auxiliary Frequency (International voice for coordinated SAR operations).
- 406 MHz / 406.1 MHz – Cospas-Sarsat international satellite-based search and rescue (SAR) distress alert detection and information distribution system
- Emergency position-indicating radiobeacon station (EPIRB)
- Search and rescue transponder (SART)
- Survival radio

== See also ==
- Aircraft emergency frequency
- Distress signal
- Global Maritime Distress Safety System
- Mayday
- SOS
