= Emergency position-indicating radio beacon =

Radio transmitter to locate people in distress

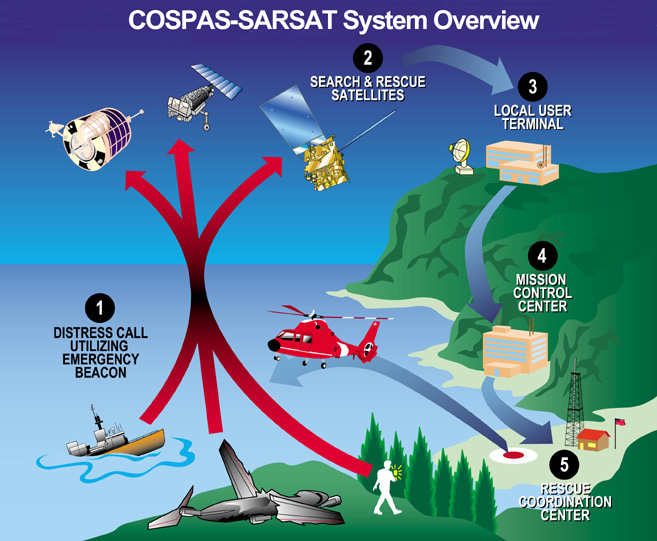
Overview diagram of COSPAS-SARSAT communication system used to detect and locate ELTs, EPIRBs, and PLBs

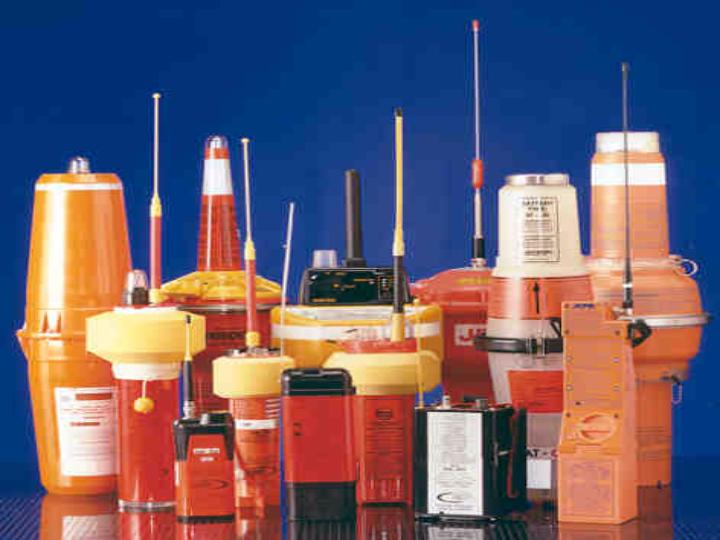
First generation EPIRB emergency locator beacons

An emergency position-indicating radio beacon (EPIRB) is a type of emergency locator beacon for commercial and recreational boats; it is a portable, battery-powered radio transmitter used in emergencies to locate boaters in distress and in need of immediate rescue. In the event of an emergency, such as a ship sinking or medical emergency onboard, the transmitter is activated and transmits a continuous 406 MHz distress radio signal, which is used by search-and-rescue teams to quickly locate the emergency and render aid.

The distress signal is detected by satellites operated by an international consortium of rescue services, COSPAS-SARSAT, which can detect emergency beacons anywhere on Earth transmitting on the distress frequency of 406 MHz. The satellites calculate the position or utilize the GPS coordinates of the beacon and quickly pass the information to the appropriate local first responder organization, which performs the search and rescue. As the search and rescue team approach the search areas, they use direction finding (DF) equipment to locate the beacon using the 121.5 MHz homing signal, or in newer EPIRBs, the automatic identification system (AIS) location signal. The basic purpose of this system is to help rescuers find survivors within the so-called "golden day" (the first 24 hours following a traumatic event) during which the majority of survivors can usually be saved.

The feature distinguishing a modern EPIRB, often called GPIRB, from other types of emergency beacon is that it contains a GPS receiver and broadcasts its position, usually accurate within 100 m (330 ft), to facilitate location. Previous emergency beacons without a GPS can only be localized to within 2 km (1.2 mi) by the COSPAS satellites and rescuers relied heavily upon the 121.5 MHz homing signal to pin-point the beacons location as they arrived on scene.

The standard frequency of a modern EPIRB is 406 MHz. It is an internationally regulated mobile radiocommunication service that aids search-and-rescue operations to detect and locate distressed watercraft, aircraft, and people.

The first form of these beacons was the 121.5 MHz ELT, which was designed as an automatic locator beacon for crashed military aircraft. These beacons were first used in the 1950s by the U.S. military and were mandated for use on many types of commercial and general aviation aircraft beginning in the early 1970s. The frequency and signal format used by the ELT beacons was not designed for satellite detection, which resulted in a system with poor location detection abilities and long delays in detection of activated beacons. The satellite detection network was built after the ELT beacons were already in general use, with the first satellite not being launched until 1982, and even then, the satellites only provided detection, with location accuracy being roughly 20 km (12 mi). The technology was later expanded to cover use on vessels at sea (EPIRB), individual persons (PLB), and starting in 2016, maritime survivor locating devices (MSLD). All have migrated from using 121.500 MHz as their primary frequency to using 406 MHz, which was designed for satellite detection and location, however most models still broadcast a secondary signal on 121.5 MHz as well, as this helps rescue teams pinpoint the location of survivors once in their vicinity with more accuracy (within 2km) than the 406 MHz frequency allows on its own.

Since the inception of COSPAS-SARSAT in 1982, distress radio beacons have assisted in the rescue of over 50,000 people in more than 7,000 distress situations. In 2010 alone, the system provided information used to rescue 2,388 persons in 641 distress situations.

== Types of emergency locator beacons ==
The several types of emergency locator beacons are distinguished by the environment for which they were designed to be used:

- ELT (emergency locator transmitters) are carried on aircraft and are activated in the event of a crash.
  - Activated by G-switch (crash sensor) or manually by cockpit remote switch or ON switch on ELT.
- EPIRB (emergency position-indicating radio beacons) are carried on ships and boats, and signal maritime distress.
  - Activated by water when the beacon is out of the bracket or manually by the ON switch on the EPIRB.
- SEPIRB (submarine emergency position-indicating radio beacons) are EPIRBs designed only for use on submarines.
- SSAS (ship security alert systems) are used to indicate possible piracy or terrorism attacks discreetly on sea-going vessels.
  - Activated by discreet switch/button in the ship's bridge or cabin, or manually on the SSAS.
- PLB (personal locator beacons) are carried by individuals and intended to indicate a person in distress who is away from normal emergency services; e.g., 9-1-1. They are also used for crew-saving applications in shipping and lifeboats at terrestrial systems. In New South Wales, some police stations and the NSW National Parks & Wildlife Service provide personal locator beacons to hikers for no charge.
  - Activated manually by deploying antenna and pressing the ON button/switch.

Distress alerts transmitted from ELTs, EPIRBs, SSAS, and PLBs are received and processed by the International Cospas-Sarsat Programme, the international satellite system for search and rescue (SAR). These beacons transmit a 406 MHz distress signal every 50 seconds, varying over a span of 2.5 seconds to avoid multiple beacons always transmitting at the same time.

When manually activated, or automatically activated upon immersion or impact, such beacons send out a distress signal. The signals are monitored worldwide and the location of the distress is detected by non-geostationary satellites using the Doppler effect for trilateration, and in more recent EPIRBs, also by GPS.

Loosely related devices, including search and rescue transponders (SART), AIS-SART, avalanche transceivers, and RECCO do not operate on 406 MHz, thus are covered in separate articles.

== International COSPAS-SARSAT programme ==
Cospas-Sarsat is an international organization that has been a model of international cooperation, even during the Cold War. SARSAT means search-and-rescue satellite-aided tracking. COSPAS (КОСПАС) is an acronym for the Russian words "COsmicheskaya Sistema Poiska Avariynyh Sudov" (Космическая Система Поиска Аварийных Судов), which translates to "space system for the search of vessels in distress". A consortium of USSR, the U.S., Canada, and France formed the organization in 1982. Since then, 29 other countries have joined.

The satellites used in the system include:

- LEOSAR or Low Earth Orbiting Search and Rescue Satellites
  - The LEOSAR system calculates the location of distress events using Doppler processing techniques. Doppler processing is based upon the principle that the frequency of the distress beacon, as "heard" by the satellite instrument, is affected by the relative velocity of the satellite with respect to the beacon. By monitoring the change of the beacon frequency of the received beacon signal and knowing the exact position of the satellite, the LUT is able to calculate the location of the beacon.
- GEOSAR or Geosynchronous Earth Orbiting Search and Rescue Satellites
  - As a GEOSAR satellite remains fixed relative to the Earth rotating with the earth around the equator, GEOSAR satellites utilize the GPS provided by the EPIRB, PLB, or ELT to provide rescuers with beacon position information.
- MEOSAR or Mid-Earth Orbiting Search and Rescue Satellites
  - The newest of the Cospas Sarsat satellites, detect EPIRB, PLB, and ELT distress signals in almost real-time (i.e within 5 minutes) including the beacons location with or without GPS.
  - The new MEOSAR system also provides the framework along with the Galileo Global Navigation Satellite System (GNSS) for EPIRBs, PLBs, and EPIRBs to utilize the new Return Link Service or RLS that provides a confirmation message from Search and Rescue back to the beacon to let the survivors know their distress message was confirmed.

Cospas-Sarsat defines standards for beacons, auxiliary equipment to be mounted on conforming weather and communication satellites, ground stations, and communications methods. The satellites communicate the beacon data to their ground stations, which forward it to main control centers of each nation that can initiate a rescue effort.

Cospas Sarsat Monitoring include:

- Local User Terminals (LUTs)
- Mission Control Centers (MCC)
- Rescue Coordination Center (RCC)

== Detection and location ==
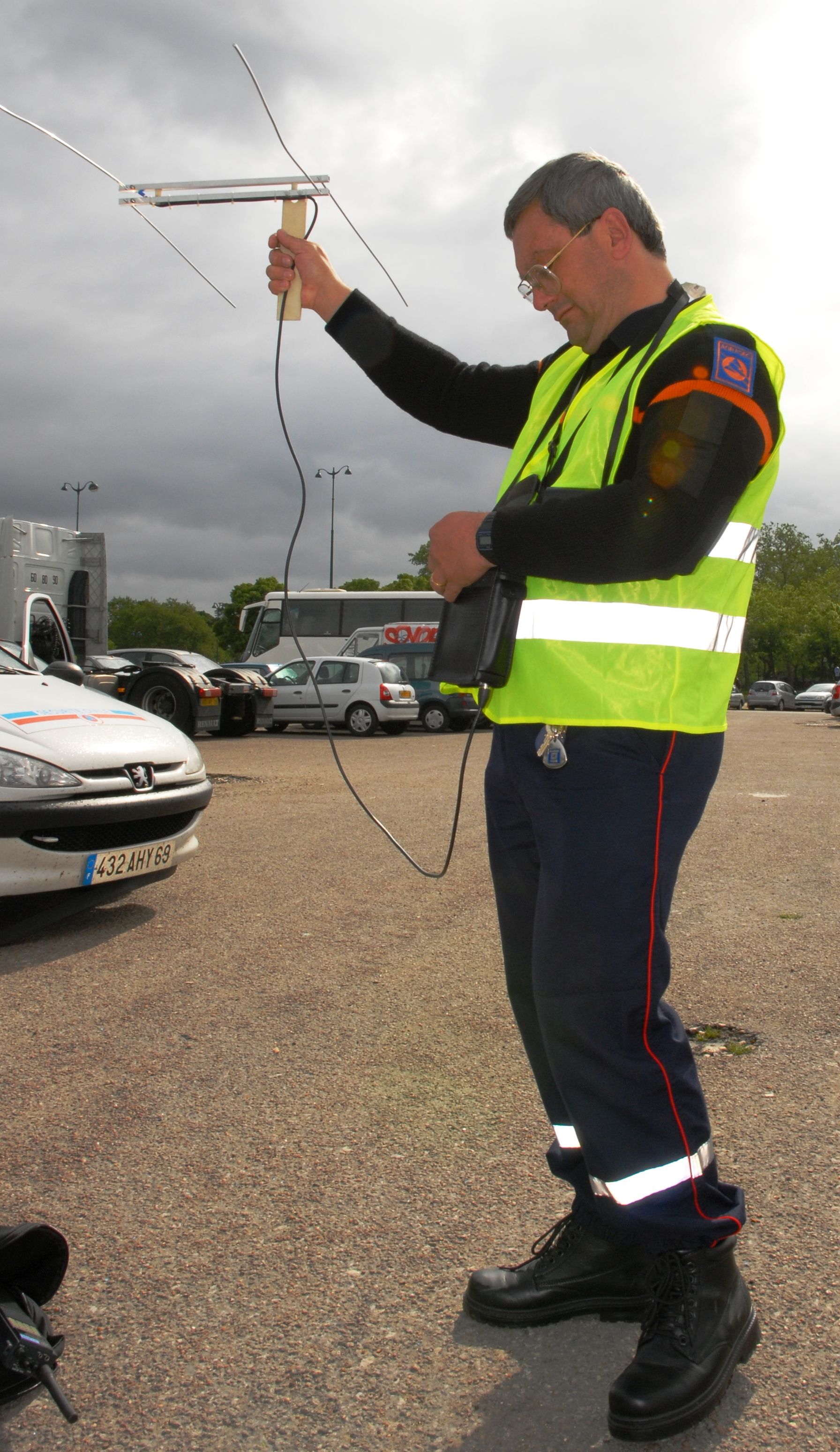
VHF radio direction finding

A transmission is typically detected and processed in this manner:

1. The transmitter is activated, either automatically in a crash or after sinking, or manually by survivors of an emergency situation.
2. At least one satellite picks up the beacon's transmission.
3. The satellites transfer the beacon's signal to their respective ground control stations.
4. The ground stations process the signals and forward the data, including approximate location, to a national authority.
5. The national authority forwards the data to a rescue authority
6. The rescue authority uses its own receiving equipment afterwards to locate the beacon and commence its own rescue or recovery operations.

Once the satellite data is received, less than a minute is needed to forward them to any signatory nation. The primary means of detection and location is by the COSPAS-SARSAT satellites. However, additional means of location are frequently used. For example, the FAA requires that all pilots monitor 121.500 MHz whenever possible, and the USCG has a network of direction finder sites along the coastlines. The National Oceanic and Atmospheric Administration maintains a near-real-time map that shows SARSAT U.S. Rescues.

Several systems are in use, with beacons of varying expense, different types of satellites, and varying performance. Carrying even the oldest systems provides an immense improvement in safety over carrying none.

The types of satellites in the network are:

- LEOSAR
  - Support Doppler detection and reception of encoded position
  - Receivers are payloads on various Low Earth Orbit satellites
- MEOSAR
  - Medium Earth Orbiting Search and Rescue
  - Receivers are payloads on the U.S. GPS satellites, on the Russian GLONASS satellites, and on the European GALILEO satellites.
- GEOSAR
  - Supports only reception of encoded position
  - Receivers are payloads on various geosynchronous satellites, including some of the U.S. GOES weather satellites (including GOES-16).

When one of the COSPAS-SARSAT satellites detects a beacon, the detection is passed to one of the program's roughly 30 Mission Control Centers, such as USMCC (in Suitland, Maryland), where the detected location and beacon details are used to determine to which rescue coordination centre (for example, the U.S. Coast Guard's PACAREA RCC, in Alameda, California) to pass the alert.

=== Beacon operation ===
==== GPS-based, registered ====
The 406-MHz beacons with GPS track with a precision of 100 m in the 70% of the world closest to the equator, and send a serial number so the responsible authority can look up phone numbers to notify the registrant (e.g., next-of-kin) in four minutes.

The GPS system permits stationary, wide-view geosynchronous communications satellites to enhance the Doppler position received by low Earth orbit satellites. EPIRB beacons with built-in GPS are usually called GPIRBs, for GPS position-indicating radio beacon or global position-indicating radio beacon.

However, rescue cannot begin until a Doppler track is available. The COSPAS-SARSAT specifications say that a beacon location is not considered "resolved" unless at least two Doppler tracks match or a Doppler track confirms an encoded (GPS) track. One or more GPS tracks are not sufficient.

==== High-precision registered ====
An intermediate technology 406-MHz beacon (now mostly obsolete in favor of GPS-enabled units) has worldwide coverage, locates within 2 km (12.5 km^{2} search area), notifies kin and rescuers in 2 hours maximum (46 min average), and has a serial number to look up phone numbers, etc. This can take up to two hours because it has to use moving weather satellites to locate the beacon. To help locate the beacon, the beacon's frequency is controlled to 2 parts per billion, and its power is five watts.

Both of the above types of beacons usually include an auxiliary 25-milliwatt beacon at 121.5 MHz to guide rescue aircraft.

==== Traditional ELT, unregistered ====
The oldest, cheapest beacons are aircraft ELTs that send an anonymous warble on the aviation band distress frequency at 121.5 MHz. The frequency is often routinely monitored by commercial aircraft, but has not been monitored by satellite since Feb. 1, 2009.

These distress signals could be detected by satellite over only 60% of the earth, required up to 6 hours for notification, located within 20 km (12 mi) (search area of 1200 km^{2}), were anonymous, and could not be located well because their frequency is only accurate to 50 parts per million and the signals were broadcast using only 75–100 milliwatts of power. Coverage was partial because the satellite had to be in view of both the beacon and a ground station at the same time; the satellites did not store and forward the beacon's position. Coverage in polar and Southern Hemisphere areas was poor.

False alarms were common, as the beacon transmitted on the aviation emergency frequency, with interference from other electronic and electrical systems. To reduce false alarms, a beacon was confirmed by a second satellite pass, which could easily slow confirmation of a 'case' of distress to as much as 4 hours (although in rare circumstances, the satellites could be positioned such that immediate detection becomes possible.)

==== Location by Doppler (without GPS) ====
The Cospas-Sarsat system was made possible by Doppler processing. Local-user terminals (LUTs) detecting nongeostationary satellites interpret the Doppler frequency shift heard by LEOSAR and MEOSAR satellites as they pass over a beacon transmitting at a fixed frequency. The interpretation determines both bearing and range. The range and bearing are measured from the rate of change of the heard frequency, which varies both according to the path of the satellite in space and the rotation of the earth. This triangulates the position of the beacon. A faster change in the Doppler indicates that the beacon is closer to the satellite's orbit. If the beacon is moving toward or away from the satellite track due to the Earth's rotation, it is on one side or other of the satellite's path. Doppler shift is zero at the closest point of approach between the beacon and the orbit.

If the beacon's frequency is more precise, it can be located more precisely, saving search time, so modern 406-MHz beacons are accurate to 2 parts per billion, giving a search area of only 2 km^{2}, compared to the older beacons accurate to 50 parts per million that had 200 km^{2} of search area.

To increase the useful power, and handle multiple simultaneous beacons, modern 406-MHz beacons transmit in bursts, and remain silent for about 50 seconds.

Russia developed the original system, and its success drove the desire to develop the improved 406-MHz system. The original system was a brilliant adaptation to the low-quality beacons, originally designed to aid air searches. It used just a simple, lightweight transponder on the satellite, with no digital recorders or other complexities. Ground stations listened to each satellite as long as it was above the horizon. Doppler shift was used to locate the beacon(s). Multiple beacons were separated when a computer program analysed the signals with a fast Fourier transform. Also, two satellite passes per beacon were used. This eliminated false alarms by using two measurements to verify the beacon's location from two different bearings. This prevented false alarms from VHF channels that affected a single satellite. Regrettably, the second satellite pass almost doubled the average time before notification of the rescuing authority. However, the notification time was much less than a day.

=== Satellites ===
Receivers are auxiliary systems mounted on several types of satellites. This substantially reduces the program's cost. The weather satellites that carry the SARSAT receivers are in "ball of yarn" orbits, inclined at 99 degrees. The longest period that all satellites can be out of line-of-sight of a beacon is about two hours. The first satellite constellation was launched in the early 1970s by the Soviet Union, Canada, France and the United States.

Some geosynchronous satellites have beacon receivers. Since the end of 2003, there are four such geostationary satellites (GEOSAR) that cover more than 80% of the surface of the earth. As with all geosynchronous satellites, they are located above the equator. The GEOSAR satellites do not cover the polar caps. Since they see the Earth as a whole, they see the beacon immediately, but have no motion, and thus no Doppler frequency shift to locate it. However, if the beacon transmits GPS data, the geosynchronous satellites give nearly instantaneous response.

== Search-and-rescue response ==
Emergency beacons operating on 406 MHz transmit a unique 15-, 22-, or 30-character serial number called a hex code. When the beacon is purchased, the hex code should be registered with the relevant national (or international) authority. After one of the mission control centers has detected the signal, this registration information is passed to the rescue coordination center, which then provides the appropriate search-and-rescue agency with crucial information, such as:

- phone numbers to call
- a description of the vessel, aircraft, vehicle, or person (in the case of a PLB)
- the home port of a vessel or aircraft
- any additional information that may be useful to SAR agencies

Registration information allows SAR agencies to start a rescue more quickly. For example, if a shipboard telephone number listed in the registration is unreachable, it could be assumed that a real distress event is occurring. Conversely, the information provides a quick and easy way for the SAR agencies to check and eliminate false alarms (potentially sparing the beacon's owner from significant false alert fines).

An unregistered 406-MHz beacon still carries some information, such as the manufacturer and serial number of the beacon, and in some cases, an MMSI or aircraft tail number/ICAO 24-bit address. Despite the clear benefits of registration, an unregistered 406-MHz beacon is very substantially better than a 121.5-MHz beacon, because the hex code received from a 406-MHz beacon confirms the authenticity of the signal as a real distress signal.

Beacons operating on 121.5 MHz and 243.0 MHz only simply transmit an anonymous siren tone, thus carry no position or identity information to SAR agencies. Such beacons now rely solely on the terrestrial or aeronautical monitoring of the frequency.

=== Responsible agencies ===
RCCs are responsible for a geographic area, known as a "search-and-rescue region of responsibility" (SRR). SRRs are designated by the International Maritime Organization and the International Civil Aviation Organization. RCCs are operated unilaterally by personnel of a single military service (e.g. an air force, or a navy) or a single civilian service (e.g. a national police force, or a coast guard).

==== Americas ====
These international search-and-rescue points of contact receive SAR alerts from the USMCC.

SPOC	SRR Name	Geographic Coverage	SAR Agency
Argentina - Servicio de Alerta de Socorro Satelital (SASS)	ARMCC		
Bermuda Maritime Operations Centre	BERMUDASP		
Central American Corporation for Navigation Area Services	COCESNA		
Colombia	COLMSP		
Dominican Republic	DOMREPSP		
Ecuador	ECSP		
Guyana	GUYSP		
Mexico	MEXISP		
Mexico Telecommunications	MEXTEL		
Netherlands Antilles	NANTSP		
Panama	PANSP		
Trinidad and Tobago	TTSP		
Venezuela	VZMCC		
Bolivia	BOLSP		
Chile RCC	ChileRCC		
Paraguay	PARSP		
Uruguay	URSP		

===== United States =====
The U.S. NOAA operates the U.S. Mission Control Center (USMCC) in Suitland, Maryland. It distributes beacon signal reports to one or more of these RCCs:

United States SPOCs
RCC	SRR name	Geographic coverage	SAR agency	Phone number
Air Force Rescue Coordination Center	AFRCC	Land-based emergency signals in the lower 48 states	United States Air Force Auxiliary Civil Air Patrol	
Alaska Air National Guard operates the Alaska Rescue Coordination Center	AKRCC	Alaskan inland areas	On-shore beacons are investigated by local search-and-rescue services in Alaska.	
U.S. Coast Guard		The Coast Guard investigates offshore beacons and rescues victims.		
Coast Guard Atlantic Area	LANTAREA			757-398-6700
District 1: Boston, MA (RCC Boston)	CGD01			(617)223-8555
District 5: Portsmouth, VA (RCC Norfolk)	CGD05			(757)398-6231
District 7: Miami, FL (RCC Miami)	CGD07			(305)415-6800
District 8: New Orleans, LA (RCC New Orleans)	CGD08			(504)589-6225
District 9: Cleveland, OH (RCC Cleveland)	CGD09			(216)902-6117
District 11: Alameda, CA (RCC Alameda and Pacific SAR Coordinator)	PACAREA			(510)437-3701
District 13: Seattle, WA (RCC Seattle)	CGD13			(206)220-7001
District 14: Honolulu, HI (RCC Honolulu; operated as JRCC with DOD)	CGD14			(808)535-3333
District 17: Juneau, AK (RCC Juneau)	CGD17			(907)463-2000
U.S. Coast Guard Sector San Juan (RSC) (sub-sector of RCC Miami)	SANJN			(787)289-2042
U.S. Coast Guard Sector Guam (RSC) (coordinates SAR under RCC Honolulu)	MARSEC			(671)355-4824

The US Coast Guard web page for EPIRBs states: "You may be fined for false activation of an unregistered EPIRB. The US Coast Guard routinely refers cases involving the nondistress activation of an EPIRB (e.g., as a hoax, through gross negligence, carelessness, or improper storage and handling) to the Federal Communications Commission. The FCC will prosecute cases based upon evidence provided by the Coast Guard, and will issue warning letters or notices of apparent liability for fines up to $10,000."

===== Canada =====
The Canadian Mission Control Centre receives and distributes distress alerts.

In Canada, the Canadian Coast Guard and Canadian Forces Search and Rescue (Royal Canadian Air Force and Royal Canadian Navy) are partners in Joint Rescue Co-ordination Centres; CCG operates Maritime Rescue Subcentres to offload work from JRCC.

RCC	SRR Name	Geographic Coverage	SAR Agency
Joint Rescue Coordination Centre Halifax	HALIFAX	Halifax Search and Rescue Region	
Maritime Rescue Sub-Centre Quebec	QuebecCity	the St. Lawrence River within the province of Quebec; the northern and western waters of the Gulf of St. Lawrence within the province of Quebec; the navigable estuary portion of the Saguenay River; the Richelieu River within the province of Quebec; the southern portion of the Ottawa River downstream from the Carillon Generating Station	
Joint Rescue Coordination Centre Trenton	TRENTON	Trenton Search and Rescue Region. AIRCOM also operates the Canadian Mission Control Centre (CMCC) from JRCC Trenton	
Joint Rescue Coordination Centre Victoria	VICTORIA	Victoria Search and Rescue Region	
Maritime Rescue Sub-Centre St. John's		waters surrounding the province of Newfoundland and Labrador	

==== Europe ====
===== United Kingdom =====
The United Kingdom, the Department for Transport, Maritime and Coastguard Agency operates the Mission Control Centre (UKMCC), which receives and distributes distress alerts.

In the UK, the Distress and Diversion Cell of the Royal Air Force provides continuous monitoring of 121.5 MHz and 243.0 MHz, with autotriangulation from a network of terrestrial receivers on both frequencies.

==== Russia ====
In Russia, operations are supported by the Federal State Unitary Enterprise Morsvyazsputnik.

==== Asia ====
In Hong Kong, operations are supported by the Hong Kong Marine Department's Hong Kong Maritime Rescue Co-ordination Centre (MRCC)

In India, operations are supported by the Indian Space Research Organisation (ISRO) and by the Indian Coast Guard's Maritime Rescue Coordination Centre Mumbai (MRCC)

In China, operations are supported by the Maritime Safety Administration, Bureau of Harbour Superintendency.

In Japan, operations are supported by the Japan Coast Guard

In Vietnam, operations are supported by the Ministry of Transport, Vietnam Maritime Administration (VINAMARINE).

In Singapore, operations are supported by the Civil Aviation Authority of Singapore.

In the Republic of Korea, operations are supported by the Korea Coast Guard.

In Indonesia, operations are supported by the National SAR Agency of Indonesia (BASARNAS).

In Taiwan, operations are supported by the International Telecommunication Development Company (ITDC)

== Phase-out of 121.5 MHz satellite alerting service ==
Because of the extremely high numbers of false alerts on the 121.500 MHz frequency (over 98% of all COSPAS-SARSAT alerts), the IMO eventually requested a termination of COSPAS-SARSAT processing of 121.5 MHz signals. The ICAO Council also agreed to this phase-out request, and the COSPAS-SARSAT Council decided that future satellites would no longer carry the 121.5 MHz search and rescue repeater (SARR). Since 1 February 2009, only 406 MHz beacons are detected by the international Cospas-Sarsat SAR satellite system. This affects all maritime beacons (EPIRBs), all aviation beacons (ELTs) and all personal beacons (PLBs). In other words, Cospas-Sarsat has ceased satellite detection and processing of 121.5/243 MHz beacons. These older beacons are now only detectable by ground-based receivers and aircraft.

EPIRBs that do not transmit on 406 MHz are banned on boats in the United States and in many other jurisdictions. More information about the switch to 406 MHz is available on Cospas-Sarsat's 121.5/243 Phase-Out page.

Despite the switch to 406 MHz, pilots and ground stations are encouraged to continue to monitor for transmissions on the emergency frequencies, as most 406 MHz beacons are required to be equipped with 121.5 "homers." Furthermore, the 121.5 MHz frequency remains the official global VHF aircraft voice distress frequency.

=== FAA transition status ===
In a Safety Recommendation released September 2007, the U.S. National Transportation Safety Board once again recommended that the U.S. FAA require all aircraft have 406 MHz ELTs. They first recommended this back in 2000 and after vigorous opposition by AOPA, the FAA declined to do so. Citing two recent accidents, one with a 121.5 MHz ELT and one with a 406 MHz ELT, the NTSB concludes that switching all ELTs to 406 MHz is a necessary goal to work towards.

NASA has conducted crash tests with small airplanes to investigate how ELTs perform.

== Emergency Locator Transmitters ==
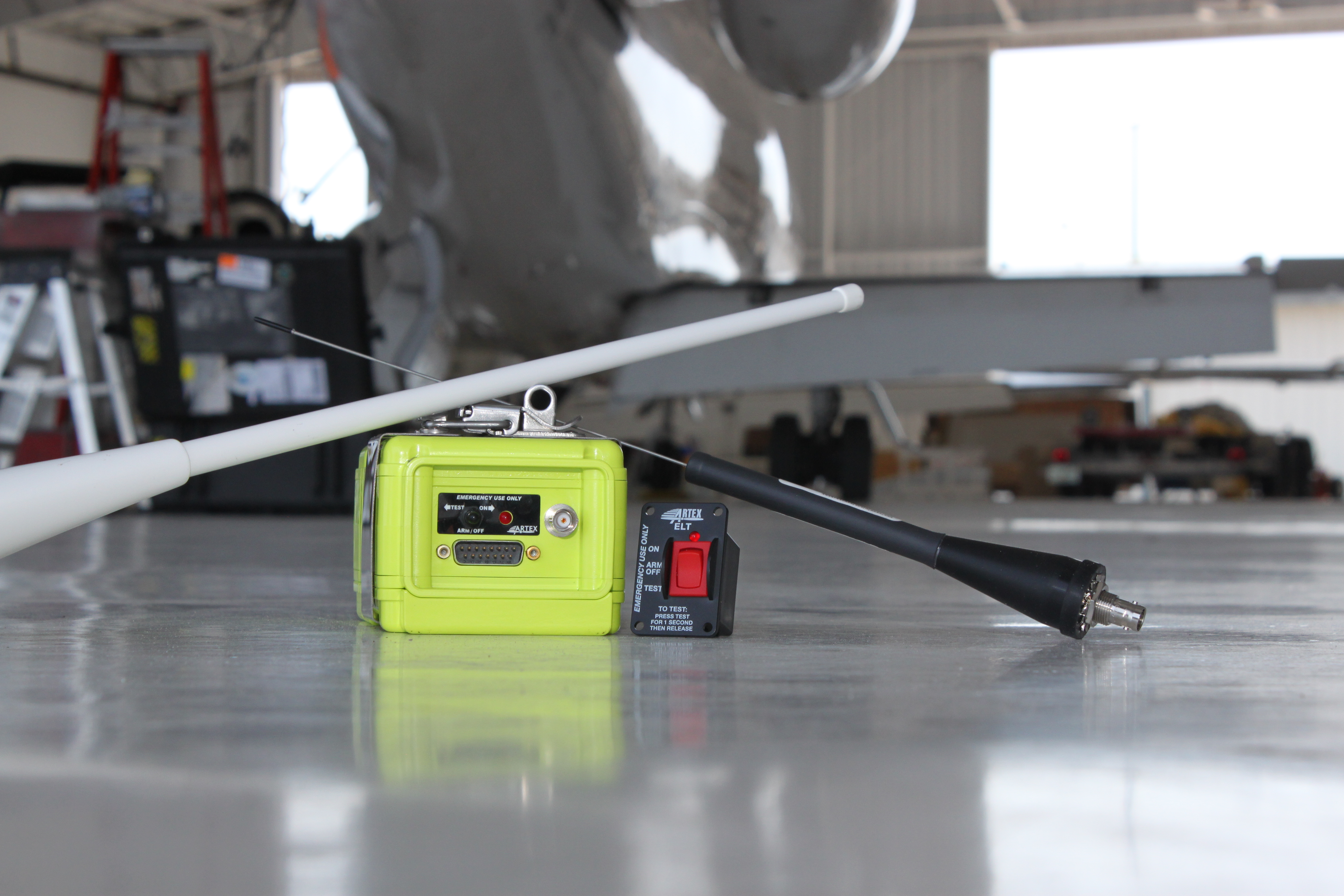
ELT about to be installed onto an airplane

The radiotelephony locator beacon sound made by ELTs and some EPIRBs

Emergency Locator Transmitters (ELTs) are expensive devices (average cost for aviation use is $1500–3000). In commercial aircraft, a cockpit voice recorder or flight data recorder must contain an underwater locator beacon. In the US, ELTs are required to be permanently installed in most general aviation aircraft, depending upon the type or location of operation.

The specifications for the design of ELTs are published by the RTCA, and in the specification the alarm signal is defined as an AM signal (A3X and/or N0N emissions), containing a swept tone ranging from 1600 Hz to 300 Hz (downwards), with 2-4 sweeps per second. When activated, 406 MHz units transmit a 0.5 second, 5-watt digital burst every 50 seconds, varying within a span of ±2.5 seconds somewhat randomly, so as to avoid multiple ELTs always having their beacons synchronized.

As per 14 CFR 91.207.a.1, ELTs built according to TSO-C91 (of the type described below as "Traditional ELT, unregistered") have not been permitted for new installations since June 21, 1995; the replacing standard was TSO-C91a. Furthermore, TSO-C91/91a ELTs are being replaced / supplemented by the TSO C126 406 MHz ELT, a far superior unit.

ELTs are unique among distress radiobeacons in that they have impact monitors and are activated by g-force.

Although monitoring of 121.5 and 243 MHz (Class B) distress signals by satellite ceased in February 2009, the FAA has not mandated an upgrade of older ELT units to 406 MHz in United States aircraft. Transport Canada has put forward a proposed regulatory requirement that requires upgrade to Canadian registered aircraft to either a 406 MHz ELT or an alternate means system; however, elected officials have overruled the recommendation of Transport Canada for the regulation and have asked for a looser regulation to be drafted by Transport Canada. Recent information indicates Transport Canada may permit private, general aviation flight with only an existing 121.5 MHz ELT if there is a placard visible to all passengers stating to the effect that the aircraft does not comply with international recommendations for the carriage of the 406 MHz emergency alerting device and is not detectable by satellites in the event of a crash.

In the case of 121.5 MHz beacons, the frequency is known in aviation as the "VHF Guard" emergency frequency, and all U.S. civilian pilots (private and commercial) are required, by FAA policy, to monitor this frequency when it is possible to do so. The frequency can be used by Automatic Direction Finder (ADF) radionavigation equipment, which is being phased out in favor of VOR and GPS but is still found on many aircraft. ELTs are relatively large, and would fit in a cube about 30 cm (12 in) on a side, and weigh 2 to 5 kg (4.4 to 11.0 lb).

ELTs were first mandated in 1973 by FAA technical standard order (TSO-C91). The original TSO-C91, and updated TSO-C91A were officially deprecated as of February 2, 2009, when reception of the 121.5 MHz signal was deactivated on all of the SAR satellite, in favor of the C126 ELT models, with their 406 MHz Cospas-Sarsat beacons. However, the 121.5 MHz signal is still used for close-in direction finding of a downed aircraft.

=== ELT activation ===
Automatic ELTs have impact monitors activated by g-force. Numerous activities, such as aerobatics, hard landings, movement by ground crews and aircraft maintenances, can generate false alarms, which can interfere with and cannot be distinguished from genuine emergency transmissions.

=== ELT sub-classification ===
Emergency locator transmitters (ELTs) for aircraft may be classed as follows:

- A: automatically ejected
- AD: automatic deployable
- F: Fixed
- AF: automatic fixed
- AP: automatic portable
- W: water activated
- S: survival

Within these classes, an ELT may be either a digital 406 MHz beacon, or an analog beacon (see below).

==== Obsolete ELTs ====
- Any ELT that is not a 406 MHz ELT with a Hex Code became obsolete February 1, 2009.

According to the U.S. Federal Aviation Administration, ground testing of A-, B-, and S-type ELTs is to be done within the first 5 minutes of each hour. Testing is restricted to three audio sweeps. Type I and II devices (those transmitting at 406 MHz) have a self test function and must not be activated except in an actual emergency.

=== Timeline of ELT development ===
- Automatic SOS radios were developed as early as the 1930s.
- The United States Air Force institutes development of a "Crash-Locator Beacon" and a "Crash-Locator Bearing Recorder" in the early 1950s.
- In the UK, by 1959 the first automatic beacon for liferafts had been produced by Ultra Electronics, and at the same time Burndept produced the TALBE (Talk and Listen Beacon Equipment) - VHF, and SARBE - Search-And-Rescue-Beacon Equipment (UHF) range of beacons which were used by the Fleet Air Arm and later, Royal Air Force. Later, SARBE beacons included a radio for voice communication by the survivor with the rescuing personnel.
- Jan 9 1964: FAA Advisory Circular 170-4 investigated ELTs
- Mar 17 1969: FAA Advisory Circular 91-19 advised pilots to install ELTs
- A Saturday Evening Post article covered the death of 16-year-old Carla Corbus, who survived, though badly injured, along with her mother, for 54 days after the plane her step-dad was flying crashed in the Trinity Alps of California in March 1967. He was lost and died in the woods looking for rescue.
- The winter 1969 search for the Hawthorne Nevada Airlines Flight 708 "Gamblers' Special" DC-3 that crashed on February 18, 1969 in the Sierra Nevada Mountains. Five aircraft crashed and five searchers were killed while trying to find Flight 708.
- Carriage requirements for emergency locator beacons on most US non-jet powered fixed-wing civil aircraft became law on December 29, 1970, with the signing of Senate bill S.2193, "The Occupational Safety and Health Act of 1970," Public Law 91-596. as a last-minute rider to the Occupational Safety and Health Act. Senator Peter Dominick (R-Colorado) added the unrelated beacon language as a rider to the bill, which became section 31 of the law. (Earlier in the session he tried to add the requirements as an amendment to House bill H.R. 14465, the "Airport and Airways Development Act of 1969," but was unsuccessful.) It required most general aviation aircraft to install ELTs by Dec. 30, 1973, and it preempted all the state ELT laws. The federal ELT law left the matter of alerting vague, although the initial idea was alerting by over flying aircraft which could receive an ELT's 75-milliwatt signal from 50 nautical miles away. The law set the compliance dates as one year after passage for newly manufactured or imported aircraft (December 30, 1971), and three years for existing aircraft (December 30, 1973). In response to the law, the Federal Aviation Administration (FAA) published on March 13, 1971, Notice of Proposed Rule Making (NPRM) 71–7 with the proposed amendments to the Federal Aviation Regulations (FAR). After public comment, the final rules were published in the Federal Register on September 21, 1971.
- The disappearance of U.S. Congressmen Hale Boggs and Nick Begich in a general aviation aircraft on October 16, 1972 sparked the then largest ever search and rescue effort, which proved fruitless. This high-profile event further hastened the mandating of ELTs aboard aircraft.
- The RTCA published DO-145, DO-146, and DO-147, which the FAA then adopted the three DO documents as Technical Standard Order TSO C91.
- After problems with the C-91 ELTs, The FAA responded to the defective early ELTs by outlawing the installation of C-91 ELTs and certifying C91a ELTs with an improved gravity switch, improved crash and fire-worthy casing, and batteries that work in colder temperatures.
- March 16, 1973: AC 20–85, Emergency Locator Transmitters and Receivers
- Dec 23, 1992: TSO-C126, 406 MHz Emergency Locator Transmitter (ELT) defines the 406 MHz ELT

== Emergency Position-Indicating Radio Beacon ==
Emergency Position-Indicating Radio Beacons (EPIRBs) are a development of the ELT designed specifically for use on boats and ships, and basic models tend to be less expensive than ELTs (average cost is $800). As such, instead of using an impact sensor to activate the beacon, they typically use a water-sensing device or a submerged-sensing device that activates and releases a floating beacon after it has been submerged in between 1 and 4 meters of water. In addition to the 406 MHz signal mandated by C/S T.001, the IMO and ICAO require an auxiliary 121.5 MHz at another frequency in order to support the large installed base of 121.5 MHz direction finding equipment.

The RTCM (Radio Technical Commission for Maritime Services) maintains specifications specific to EPIRB devices. The alarm signal is defined as an AM signal (A3X and/or N0N emissions), containing a swept tone ranging from 1600 Hz to 300 Hz (either upwards or downwards), with 2-4 sweeps per second.

EPIRBs with an AIS transmitter are allocated MMSI numbers in the range 974yyzzzz.

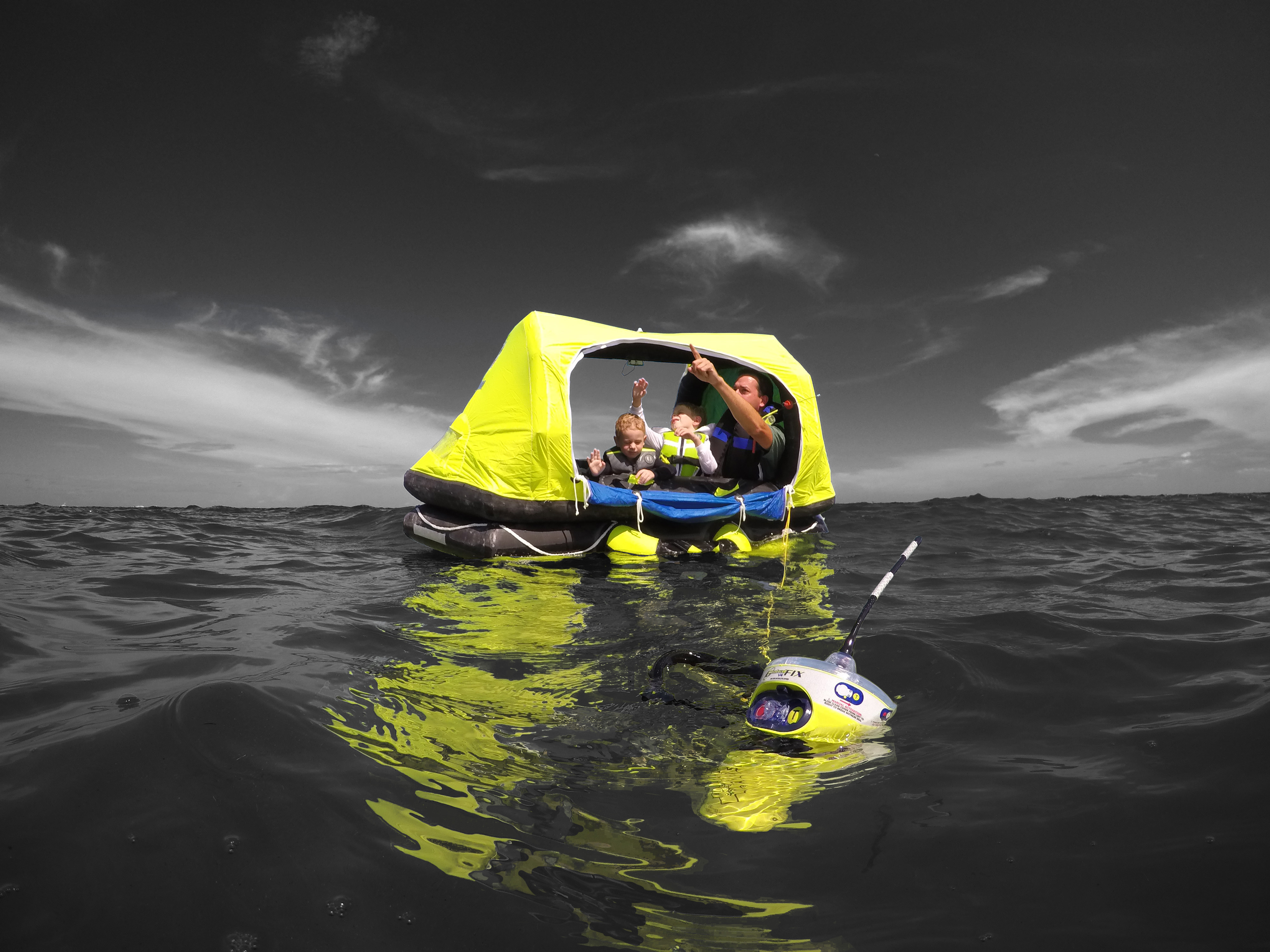
A GPS-enabled EPIRB transmitter alerts agencies of an emergency, assisting with SAR efforts.

=== EPIRB sub-classification ===
Emergency position-indicating radio beacons (EPIRBs) are sub-classified as follows:

Recognized categories:

- Category I – 406/121.5 MHz. Float-free, automatically activated EPIRB. Detectable by satellite anywhere in the world. Recognized by GMDSS.
- Category II – 406/121.5 MHz. Similar to Category I, except is manually activated. Some models are also water activated.

Obsolete classes:

- Class A – 121.5/243 MHz. Float-free, automatically activating. Due to limited signal coverage and possible lengthy delays in signal recognition, the U.S. Coast Guard no longer recommends use of this type. These devices have been phased out by the U.S. Federal Communications Commission (FCC) and are no longer recognized.
- Class B – 121.5/243 MHz. Manually activated version of Class A. These devices have been phased out by the FCC and are no longer recognized.
- Class S – 121.5/243 MHz. Similar to Class B, except it floats, or is an integral part of a survival craft (lifeboat) or survival suit. These devices have been phased out by the FCC and are no longer recognized. Their use is no longer recommended by the U.S. Coast Guard.
- Class C – Marine VHF ch15/16. Manually activated, these beacons operate on maritime channels only, and therefore are not detectable by satellite or normal aircraft. Designed for small crafts operating close to shore, this type was only recognized in the United States. Use of these units was phased out in 1999. These devices have been phased out by the FCC and are no longer recognized.
- Inmarsat-E – This entered service in 1997 and service ended 1 December 2006; all former users have switched to Category I or II 406 MHz EPIRBs. These beacons were float-free, automatically activated EPIRBs operated on 1646 MHz and were detectable by the Inmarsat geostationary satellite system, and were recognized by GMDSS, but not by the United States. In September 2004, Inmarsat announced that it was terminating its Inmarsat E EPIRB service as of December 2006 due to a lack of interest in the maritime community.
- Furthermore, the U.S. Coast Guard recommend that no EPIRB of any type manufactured before 1989 be used.

EPIRBs are a component of the Global Maritime Distress and Safety System (GMDSS). Most commercial off-shore working vessels with passengers are required to carry a self-deploying EPIRB, while most in-shore and fresh-water craft are not.

As part of the United States efforts to prepare beacon users for the end of 121.5 MHz frequency processing by satellites, the FCC has prohibited the use of 121.5 MHz EPIRBs as of January 1, 2007 (47 CFR 80.1051). See NOAA's statement on the 121.5/243 phaseout.

=== EPIRB activation ===
Automatic EPIRBs are water activated. Some EPIRBs also "deploy"; this means that they physically depart from their mounting bracket on the exterior of the vessel (usually by going into the water.)

For a marine EPIRB to begin transmitting a signal (or "activate") it first needs to come out of its bracket (or "deploy"). Deployment can happen either manually where someone must physically remove it from its bracket or automatically where water pressure will cause a hydrostatic release unit to separate the EPIRB from its bracket. If it does not come out of the bracket it will not activate. There is a magnet in the bracket which operates a reed safety switch in the EPIRB. This prevents accidental activation if the unit gets wet from rain or turbulent seas.

Once deployed, EPIRBs can be activated, depending on the circumstances, either manually (crewman flicks a switch) or automatically (when water contacts the unit's "sea-switch".) All modern EPIRBs provide both methods of activation and deployment, and thus are labelled "Manual and Automatic Deployment and Activation."

==== Automatic hydrostatic release unit ====
A hydrostatic release unit is designed to deploy automatically when submerged to a prescribed depth; the pressure of the water activates a mechanism which releases the EPIRB.

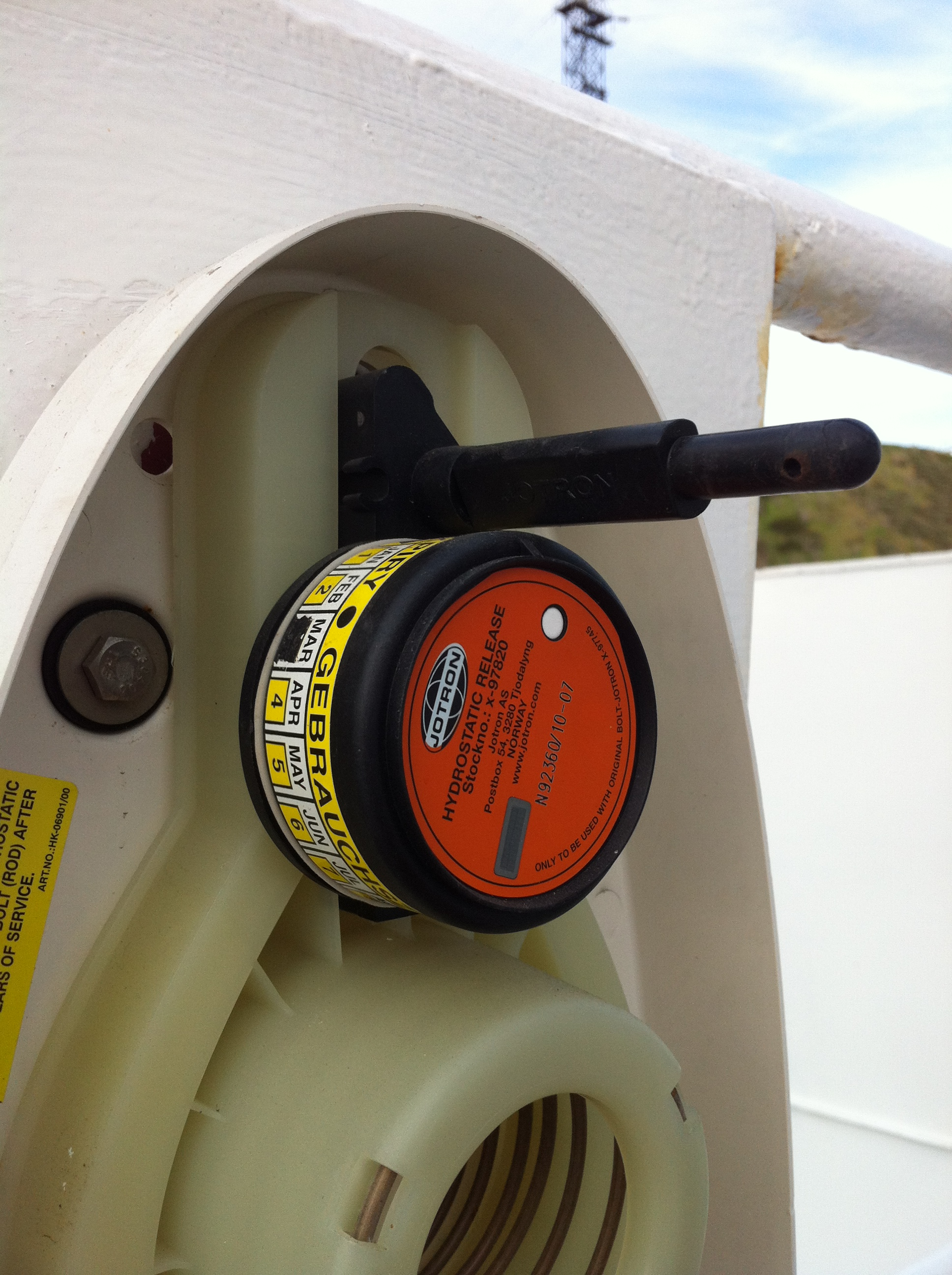
EPIRB hydrostatic release mechanism

== Submarine Emergency Positioning Indicating Radio Beacon ==
A Submarine Emergency Positioning Indicating Radio Beacon (SEPIRB) is an EPIRB that is approved for use on submarines. Two are carried on board and can be fired from the submerged signal ejectors.

== Ship Security Alert System ==
A Ship Security Alert System (SSAS) is a special variety of an EPIRB designed to alert the ship's owner(s) of a possible piracy or terrorist attack. They thus have several distinguishing operational differences:

- They are manually activated by hidden buttons or switches, much like the alarms bank tellers use.
- They are prohibited from emitting a homing signal on 121.5 MHz so as to make transmissions more covert.
- The COSPAS-SARSAT system sends the distress message to the vessel's country of origin, regardless of the location of the vessel.

As with EPIRBs, the RTCM maintains specifications for SSAS devices.

== Personal Locator Beacon ==
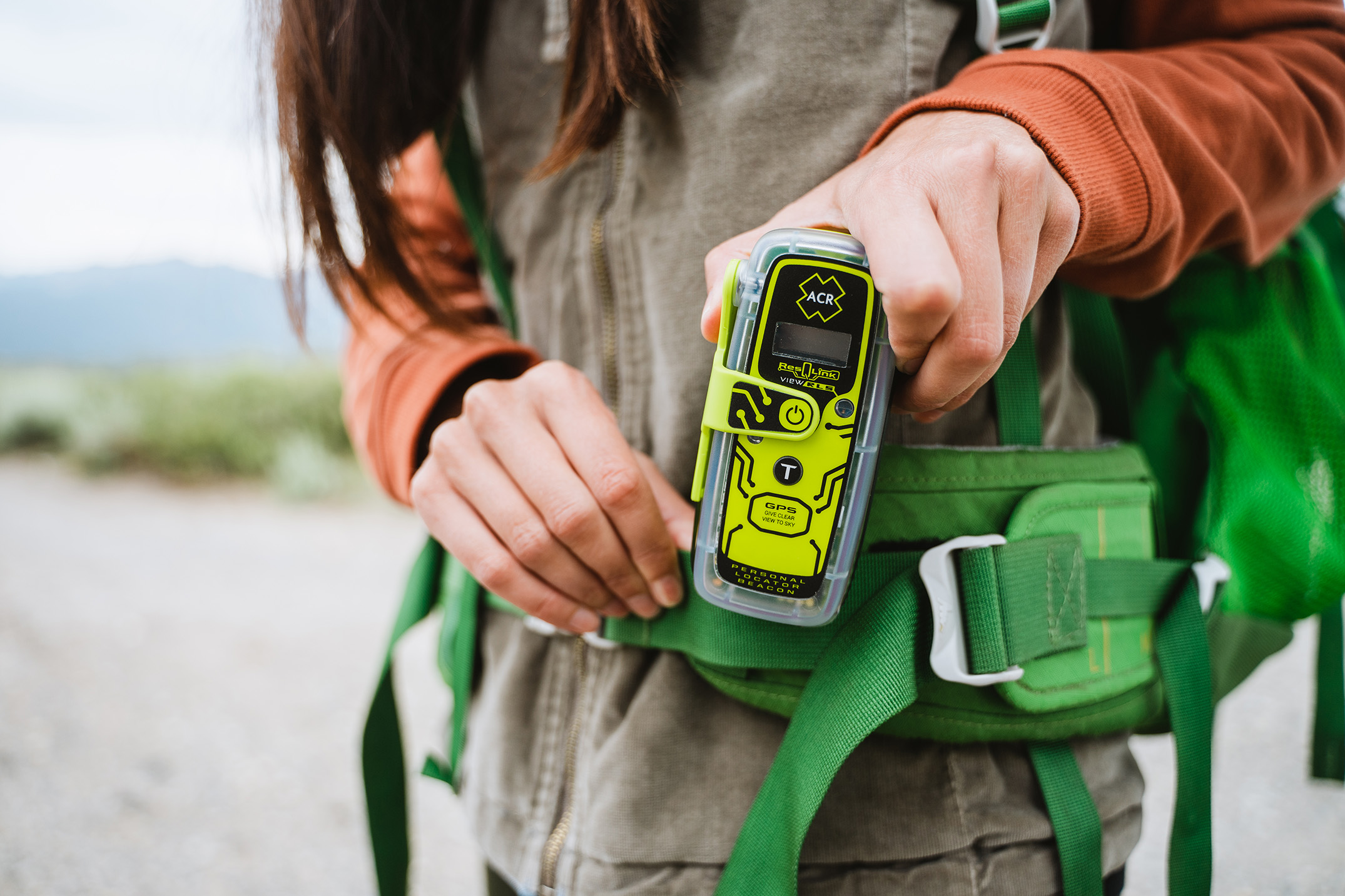
Personal Locator Beacons now include GPS, White and IR Strobe Lights and Return Link Service.

Personal Locator Beacons (PLBs) are designed for use by individuals who are hiking, kayaking, or conducting other activities on land or water where they are not in or associated with an aircraft or vessel that is equipped with its own ELT or EPIRB. As with EPIRBs, the RTCM maintains specifications for PLB devices.

PLBs vary in size from cigarette-packet to paperback book and weigh 200 g to 1 kg (1/2 to 2 1/5 lb). They can be purchased from marine suppliers, aircraft refitters, and (in Australia and the United States) hiking supply stores. They may also be hired from National Park services within Australia, often for free. The units have a useful life of 10 years, operate across a range of conditions −40 to 40 °C (−40 to 104 °F), and transmit for 24 to 48 hours.

The radiotelephony locator beacon sound made by PLBs and some EPIRBs

The alarm signal is defined as an AM signal (A3X and/or N0N emissions), containing a swept tone ranging from 300 Hz to 1600 Hz (upwards), with 2–4 sweeps per second. PLBs shall sweep upward.

PLB alerts are passed to State and Local agencies.

They must be registered to a specific person (with NOAA in the U.S.).

PLB equipment is required to include 406 MHz plus a homing frequency on 121.5 MHz.

As of 2017, PLBs must have an internal GPS.

=== PLB sub-classification ===
There are two kinds of personal locator beacon (PLB):

- PLB with GPS data (internally or externally provided)
- PLB with no GPS data

All PLBs transmit in digital mode on 406 MHz. There are AIS PLBs that transmit on VHF 70.

Personal locator beacons operating on 406 MHz must be registered. PLBs should not be used in cases where normal emergency response (such as 9-1-1) exists.

==== Obsolete PLBs ====
- U.S. Military forces at one time used 121.5/243.0 MHz beacons such as the "PRC-106," which had a built-in VHF radio. The military is replacing them with modern 406 MHz PLBs.

== Beacon content ==
The most important aspect of a beacon in classification is the mode of transmission. There are two valid transmission modes: digital and analog. Where digital usually has a longer range, analog is more reliable. Analog beacons are useful to search parties and SAR aircraft, though they are no longer monitored by satellite.

=== Analog 121.500 MHz homing signal ===
The radiotelephony locator beacon sound made by ELTs and some EPIRBs

All ELTs, all PLBs, and most EPIRBs are required to have a low-power homing signal, that is identical to the original 121.500 MHz VHF beacon signal. However, due to the extremely large number of false alarms that the old beacons generated, the transmit power was greatly reduced, and because the VHF transmitter typically uses the same antenna as the UHF beacon, the radiated signal is further reduced by the inherent inefficiencies of transmitting with an antenna not tuned to the transmitted signal.

=== Digital 406 MHz beacons ===
406 MHz UHF beacons transmit bursts of digital information to orbiting satellites, and may also contain a low-power integrated analog (121.500 MHz) homing beacon. They can be uniquely identified (via GEOSAR). Advanced beacons encode a GPS or GLONASS position into the signal. All beacons are located by Doppler triangulation to confirm the location. The digital data identifies the registered user. A phone call by authorities to the registered phone number often eliminates false alarms (false alarms are the typical case). If there is a problem, the beacon location data guides search and rescue efforts. No beacon is ignored. Anonymous beacons are confirmed by two Doppler tracks before beginning beacon location efforts.

The distress message transmitted by a 406 beacon contains the information such as:

- Which country the beacon originates from.
- A unique 15-digit hexadecimal beacon identification code (a "15-hex ID").
- The encoded identification of the vessel or aircraft in distress, either as an MMSI value, or as, in the case of an ELT, either the aircraft's registration or its ICAO 24-bit address (from its Mode-S transponder).
- When equipped, a GPS position.
- Whether or not the beacon contains a 121.5 MHz homing transmitter.

The digital distress message generated by the beacon varies according to the above factors and is encoded in 30 hexadecimal characters. The unique 15-character digital identity (the 15-hex ID) is hard-coded in the firmware of the beacon. The 406.025 MHz carrier signal is modulated plus or minus 1.1 radians with the data encoded using Manchester encoding, which ensures a net zero phase shift aiding Doppler location

==== 406 MHz beacon facts and transmission schedule ====
- 406 MHz beacons transmit for a quarter of a second immediately when turned on, and then transmit a digital burst once every 50 seconds thereafter. Both GEOSAR and LEOSAR satellites monitor these signals.
- The repetition period shall not be so stable that any two transmitters appear to be synchronized closer than a few seconds over a 5-minute period. The intent is that no two beacons will have all of their bursts coincident. The period shall be randomised around a mean value of 50 seconds, so that time intervals between transmission are randomly distributed on the interval 47.5 to 52.5 seconds. (specification for first-generation beacons)
- Preliminary specification for second-generation beacons. From beacon activation a total of [6] initial transmissions shall be made separated by fixed [5s ± 0.1s] intervals. The first transmission shall commence within [3] seconds of beacon activation. Transmissions shall then occur at nominally [30] second intervals until [30 ± 1] minutes after beacon activation. The repetition period between the start of two successive transmissions shall be randomised around the stated nominal value, so that intervals between successive transmissions are randomly distributed over ± [5] seconds. Subsequent transmissions [TBD].
- 406 MHz beacons will be the only beacons compatible with the MEOSAR (DASS) system.
- 406 MHz beacons must be registered (see below).

==== Hex codes ====
Example hex codes look like the following: 90127B92922BC022FF103504422535

- A bit telling whether the message is short (15 hex digits) or long (30 hex digits) format.
- A country code, which lets the worldwide COSPAS/SARSAT central authority identify the national authority responsible for the beacon.
- Embedded 15-Hex ID or 15-hex transmitted distress message, for example, 2024F72524FFBFF The hex ID is printed or stamped on the outside of the beacon and is hard-coded into its firmware. The 15-hex ID can only be reprogrammed by certified distress radiobeacon technicians. The national authority uses this number to look up phone numbers and other contact information for the beacon. This is crucial to handle the large number of false alarms generated by beacons.
- A location protocol number, and type of location protocol: EPIRB or MMSI, as well as all the data fields of that location protocol. If the beacon is equipped with GPS or GLONASS, a rough (rounded) latitude and longitude giving the beacon's current position. In some aircraft beacons, this data is taken from the aircraft's navigation system.
- When a beacon is sold to another country, the purchaser is responsible for having the beacon reprogrammed with a new country code and to register it with their nation's beacon registry, and the seller is responsible to de-register the deprecated beacon ID with their national beacon registry.
- One can use the beacon decoder web page at Cospas-Sarsat to extract the 15-hex ID from the 30-hex distress message.

== Frequencies ==
Distress beacons transmit distress signals on the following key frequencies; the frequency used distinguishes the capabilities of the beacon. A recognized beacon can operate on one of the three (currently) Cospas-Sarsat satellite-compatible frequencies. In the past, other frequencies were also used as a part of the search and rescue system.

=== Cospas-Sarsat (satellite) compatible beacon frequencies ===
- see above for transmission schedule
- 406 MHz UHF- carrier signal at 406.025-406.076 MHz ± 0.005 MHz

Channel frequency (status)

- Ch-1 A: 406.022 MHz (reference)
- Ch-2 B: 406.025 MHz (in use today)
- Ch-3 C: 406.028 MHz (in use today)
- Ch-4 D: 406.031 MHz
- Ch-5 E: 406.034 MHz
- Ch-6 F: 406.037 MHz (in use today)
- Ch-7 G: 406.040 MHz (in use today)
- Ch-8 H: 406.043 MHz
- Ch-9 I: 406.046 MHz
- Ch-10 J: 406.049 MHz (operational at a future date)
- Ch-11 K: 406.052 MHz (operational at a future date)
- Ch-12 L: 406.055 MHz
- Ch-13 M: 406.058 MHz
- Ch-14 N: 406.061 MHz (operational at a future date)
- Ch-15 O: 406.064 MHz (operational at a future date)
- Ch-16 P: 406.067 MHz
- Ch-17 Q: 406.070 MHz
- Ch-18 R: 406.073 MHz (operational at a future date)
- Ch-19 S: 406.076 MHz (operational at a future date)

=== Cospas-Sarsat unsupported beacon frequencies ===
- Marine VHF radio channels 15/16 – these channels are used only on the obsolete Class C EPIRBs
- The obsolete Inmarsat-E beacons transmitted to Inmarsat satellites on 1646 MHz UHF.
- 121.5 MHz VHF ± 6 kHz (frequency band protected to ±50 kHz) (Satellite detection ceased on 1 February 2009, but this frequency is still used for short-range location during a search and rescue operation)
- 243.0 MHz UHF ± 12 kHz (frequency band protected to ± 100 kHz) (prior to 1 February 2009 – COSPAS-SARSAT Compatible)

== License and registration requirements ==
=== License ===
In North America and Australasia (and most jurisdictions in Europe) no special license is required to operate an EPIRB. In some countries (for example the Netherlands) a marine radio operators license is required. The following paragraphs define other requirements relating to EPIRBs, ELTs, and PLBs.

=== Registration ===
All distress alerting beacons operating on 406 MHz should be registered; all vessels and aircraft operating under International Convention for the Safety of Life at Sea (SOLAS) and International Civil Aviation Organization (ICAO) regulations must register their beacons. Some national administrations (including the United States, Canada, Australia, and the UK) also require registration of 406 MHz beacons.

- There is no charge to register 406 MHz beacons.
- The U.S. Coast Guard warns that a user's "life may be saved as a result of registered emergency information" because it can respond more quickly to signals from registered beacons.
- Unless the national registry authority advises otherwise, personal information contained in a beacon is used exclusively for SAR distress alert resolution purposes.

The Cospas-Sarsat Handbook of Beacon Regulations provides the status of 406 MHz beacon regulations in specific countries and extracts of some international regulations pertaining to 406 MHz beacons.

The following list shows the agencies accepting 406 beacon registrations by country:

- United States – National Oceanic and Atmospheric Administration
- Canada – Canadian Beacon Registry, CFB Trenton for civil beacons, CMCC for military beacons
- Australia – Australian Maritime Safety Authority (AMSA)
- United Kingdom – United Kingdom Maritime and Coastguard Agency (MCA)
- Greece – Ministry of Merchant Marine and Hellenic Civil Aviation Authority
- France – CNES
- Italy – Stazione Satellitare Italiana - Cospas Sarsat
- Netherlands – Agentschap Telecom (NL)
- Denmark - Danish Maritime Authority
- New Zealand - New Zealand Rescue Coordination Centre
- Switzerland - Federal Office for Civil Aviation
- International – Cospas-Sarsat International 406 MHz Beacon Registration Database (IBRD)

== Specifications ==
Several regulations and technical specifications govern emergency locator beacons:

- FAA
  - AC 20–85, Emergency Locator Transmitters and Receivers, March 16, 1973
  - AC 170-4 Jan 9 1964 investigated ELTs
  - AC 91-19 mar 17 1969 advised pilots to install ELTs
  - Code of Federal Regulations §91.207 Emergency locator transmitters.
  - TSO-C91
  - TSO-C91a
  - TSO-C126: 406 MHz Emergency Locator Transmitter (ELT)
  - TSO-C126a: 406 MHz Emergency Locator Transmitter (ELT)
  - TSO-C126b: 406 MHz Emergency Locator Transmitter (ELT)
- Radio Technical Commission for Aeronautics
  - DO-127?
  - DO-145
  - DO-146
  - DO-147
- Radio Technical Commission for Maritime Services
  - Special Committee (SC) 110 on Emergency Beacons (EPIRBs and PLBs)
  - Special Committee (SC) 119 on Maritime Survivor Locator Devices
  - Special Committee (SC) 121 on Automatic Identification Systems (AIS) and digital Messaging
  - Special Committee (SC) 128 on Satellite Emergency Notification Device (SEND)
- Cospas-Sarsat
  - C/S A.001: Cospas-Sarsat Data Distribution Plan
  - C/S A.002: Cospas-Sarsat Mission Control Centres Standard Interface Description
  - C/S T.001 Specification for COSPAS-SARSAT 406 MHz Distress Beacons
  - C/S T.007: COSPAS‑SARSAT 406 MHz Distress Beacons Type Approval Standard
  - C/S T.015: Specification and Type Approval Standard for 406 MHz Ship Security Alert Beacons
  - C/S G.003, Introduction to the Cospas-Sarsat System
  - C/S G.004, Cospas-Sarsat Glossary
  - C/S G.005, Guidelines on 406 MHz Beacon Coding, Registration, and Type Approval
  - C/S S.007, Handbook of Beacon Regulations
- IMO
- ITU
  - Recommendation ITU-R M.633 (IMO's technical requirements for the 406 MHz EPIRB signal)
  - Report ITU-R M.2285-0 Maritime survivor locating systems and devices (man overboard systems) -- An overview of systems and their mode of operation
- ICAO
- IEC
  - IEC 61097-2: Global maritime distress and safety system (GMDSS) - Part 2: COSPASSARSAT EPIRB - Satellite emergency position indicating radio beacon operating on 406 MHz - Operational and performance requirements, methods of testing and required test results

=== EPIRB hydrostatic release device requirements ===
- Safety of Life at Sea Convention
  - SOLAS 74.95
- ISO
  - ISO 15734
- U.S. Federal Regulations
  - "CFR title 46 Vol 6 Section 160.062" (PDF). gpo.gov.
- U.S. Coast Guard Regulations
  - USCG 160.162
    - Corrosion resistance test
    - Temperature tests
    - Submergence and manual release test
    - Strength tests
    - Technical tests on the membrane
    - Performance test

== Alternative technologies ==
There are also other personal devices in the marketplace which do not meet the standard for 406 MHz devices.

=== Maritime Survivor Locator Device ===
A Maritime Survivor Locator Device (MSLD) is a man-overboard locator beacon. In the U.S., rules were established in 2016 in 47 C.F.R. Part 95

MOB devices with DSC or AIS are allocated MMSI numbers in the range 972yyzzzz.

A MSLD may transmit on 121.500 MHz, or one of these: 156.525 MHz, 156.750 MHz, 156.800 MHz, 156.850 MHz, 161.975 MHz, 162.025 MHz (bold are Canadian-required frequencies). Although sometimes defined in the same standards as the COSPAS-SARSAT beacons, MSLDs can not be detected by that satellite network, and are instead intended only for short-range Direction finding equipment mounted on the vessel on which the survivor was traveling.

=== AIS SART ===
These devices are distinct from traditional SAR radar transponders (SART), as they transmit AIS messages containing accurate GPS position information and include a GPS receiver and a transmitter on VHF AIS channels, so they show up on ship AIS receivers. They are lightweight and can be used to equip inflatable liferafts.

AIS-SART devices are allocated MMSI numbers in the range 970YYxxxx.

=== SEND—Satellite Emergency Notification Device ===
These devices are commonly referred to as SEND (Satellite Emergency Notification Device), and examples include SPOT and inReach.

=== APRS ===
APRS is used by amateur radio operators to track positions and send short messages. Most APRS packets contain a GPS latitude and longitude, so they can be used for both normal and emergency tracking. They also are routed to the Internet, where they are archived for some period of time, and viewable by others. There are several emergency packet types that can indicate distress. Since it is part of the amateur radio service, it costs nothing to transmit on and uses the extensive network, however, one must be a licensed amateur radio operator. There is also no guarantee that an APRS distress packet report would be seen or handled by emergency responders. It would have to be seen by an amateur radio operator and forwarded on.

== See also ==
- Emergency locator beacon – Radio-frequency beacon used to locate airplanes, vessels, and persons in distress
- 1986 British International Helicopters Chinook crash – Fatal aviation disaster in the Shetland Islands
- 1996 New Hampshire Learjet crash – 1996 aviation accident in New Hampshire
- Acronyms and abbreviations in avionics
- Aircraft emergency frequency – Emergency aeronautical frequency
- Search and rescue transponder – Transponder intended for emergency use at sea
- Automatic identification system – Tracking system using transceivers on ships
- AIS-SART – Radio transmitter which sends a location signal
- Avalanche transceiver – Emergency locator rescue radio beacon
- RECCO – Rescue technology
- Civil Air Patrol – Civilian auxiliary of the US Air Force
- Electric beacon – Radio transmitter to identify a location for navigation aid
- ENOS Rescue-System – Electronic rescue and locating system for use by divers at sea
- Global Maritime Distress and Safety System – Worldwide emergency communication system for ships at sea
- Index of aviation articles
- Satellite emergency notification device – Portable emergency satellite communication device
- Search and rescue transponder – Transponder intended for emergency use at sea
- Survival radio – Small radios carried to facilitate rescue in an emergency
- TACBE – Internationally recognized means for obtaining help
- Varig Flight 254 – 1989 aviation accident in Brazil
- GPS aircraft tracking
