= Man overboard =

Exclamation given aboard a vessel to indicate that someone has fallen off of the ship

Signal flag Oscar indicates "man overboard".

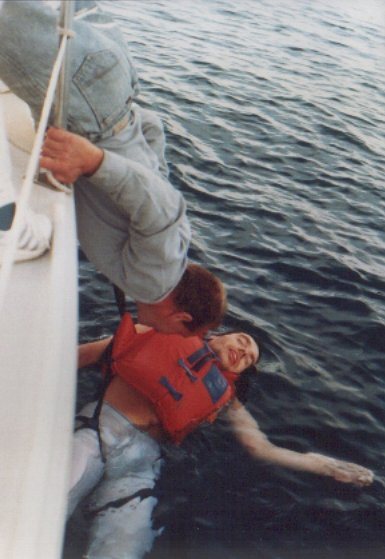
Rescue (MOB on a boat)

"Man overboard!" (also referred to as "Person overboard!", "Person in water!", "Crew overboard!", or just "Overboard Help!") is an exclamation given aboard a vessel to indicate that a member of the crew or a passenger has fallen off of the ship into the water and is in need of immediate rescue. Whoever sees the person fall is to shout a version of, "Overboard!" The call is then repeated once by every crew member within earshot, even if they have not seen the victim fall, until everyone on deck has heard and given the same call. This ensures that all other crew have been alerted to the situation and notifies the officers of the need to act immediately to save the victim. Pointing continuously at the victim may aid the helmsman in approaching the victim.

== Causes ==
A person may fall overboard for any number of reasons: they might have been struck by one of the ship's booms, they may have lost their footing on a slippery deck or while climbing the ship's ratlines, they may have deliberately jumped overboard in a suicide attempt, or any number of other reasons. Falling overboard is one of the most dangerous and life-threatening things that can happen at sea. This is especially so if falling from a large vessel that is slow to maneuver, or from a short-handed (i.e. undermanned, lacking sufficient crew) smaller boat. When single-handed and using self-steering gear, or when taking place at night or in stormy conditions, the situation is usually fatal. If the individual who falls overboard is wearing a personal flotation device (life jacket), the chances of their survival are significantly improved.

== Overboard statistics ==
From 2000 to 2018, 284 people went overboard or fell off cruise ships and a further 41 fell off large ferries. In any given month, approximately two people go overboard. Between 17 percent and 25 percent of people who go overboard are rescued.

== Recovery under sail ==
A video on preventing, and recovering from, man overboard

If the vessel has a functioning engine it should be started as soon as possible (after checking for trailing ropes). Once the sails are under control recovery should proceed as for a powerboat.

There have been various sailing maneuvers recommended and taught to handle overboard situations. Three common ones follow. Whoever sees the accident is to shout a version of "Man overboard!" loudly and clearly to alert the rest of the crew. At least one person should do nothing other than stand and point at the casualty maintaining continuous visual contact. Whatever marker and flotation equipment is to hand should be thrown as near the casualty as possible by other crew members. This may include a horseshoe buoy or lifebuoy, a danbuoy or man overboard pole, and even a floating smoke signal. If the equipment exists, man overboard alerts are to be triggered on whatever electronic gear is available including GPS receivers and DSC radio transmitters.

=== Quick stop or crash stop ===
The most direct action is to stop the boat immediately, very near to the casualty. This can be done by immediately tacking the bow of the boat through the wind without handling the jib sheets, so that the boat is effectively hove to. In some circumstances, this may be enough, and the casualty can be recovered as the boat drifts back down onto them. In many cases, however, the manoeuvre will have left the boat too far away for that. In this case, the mainsail is sheeted in hard and the turn continued until the boat circles, the wind is jibed across the stern and the boat is sailed downwind, past the casualty again and finally brought to rest by turning upwind again. It is recommended not to adjust the sails for efficient downwind sailing, so that too much speed is not built up when approaching the casualty.

The main advantages of this method are its simplicity (making it ideal for short-handed crews), and the fact that the boat does not need to be maneuvered far away of the casualty (which reduces the likelihood that the crew may lose visual contact).

=== Reach-turn-reach ===
The more traditional maneuver is more time-consuming and requires more sailing skill, but is more flexible and less likely to fail as it gives the helmsman more time to make adjustments and corrections to the course and the approach. It is more suitable for the open sea and rougher, windier conditions.

Immediately after the accident, the boat is put onto a beam reach away from the casualty, with a crew member maintaining constant visual contact. Once there is room to maneuver, the boat is either tacked or jibed back towards the casualty. It is important that the casualty is approached on a close reach, so that wind can be spilled from the sails in order to slow down and stop on station. Helmsmen are advised to test this during the approach by spilling wind on the way, and losing ground to leeward to correct the course if necessary, to ensure that this is possible. If the casualty is too windward of a close reach during the approach, it may be necessary to gain ground to windward close hauled to ensure that the boat does not stall head-to-wind downwind of the casualty at the end.

In the end, the boat is luffed to windward close to the casualty, with a view to recovering them amidships. This may be upwind of them and close in light winds, so that it drifts down to them for recovery; upwind and a few meters away for a throwing line in moderate winds; or downwind within throwing distance if they are conscious in a heavy blow to prevent dropping heavily upon them.

=== The deep beam recovery ===
An alternative maneuver, somewhere between the two above in terms of complexity and flexibility, is to put the boat onto a deep beam reach immediately after the accident, and sail a few boatlengths away downwind and to one side. At this point, the boat is rounded up and tacked so that, as in the reach-turn-reach, the casualty is approached on a close reach maintaining the ability to steer, slow down and stop as required by the conditions.

== Recovery under power ==
In a motorboat, or a sailing boat with a working engine, most people having to maneuver in an emergency will use the engine. This introduces the added hazard that the casualty may be further injured by the spinning propeller at close quarters. It is important that a double-check is made for ropes trailing in the water before the engine is engaged. These may have been dislodged by the casualty falling into the water, or may have been thrown later by people on deck trying to help, but once around the propeller, they can put the engine out of use, just when it could have been most useful. The yacht auxiliary could be used during final approaches of any of the sailing methods described above, and a motorboat's engine(s) will be used in any case. The engine(s) must be out of gear before the casualty is approached, and may be switched off entirely during the actual recovery to ease communication, reduce fumes and allow people to concentrate on the task in hand.

== Mayday ==
A person in the water is in "grave and imminent danger" which is the criterion for a mayday call. An immediate DSC alert (if possible) and mayday call should be raised so that vessels in the vicinity and rescue service will be alerted at once.

== Recovery ==
As soon as possible the casualty should be attached to the boat. Motor vessels often have bathing platforms or ladders at the stern; crew members may be able to land the casualty there. If the vessel has a dinghy available it may be possible to recover the casualty into the dinghy and from there to the main vessel particularly if the dinghy is kept on stern davits.

Most hulls have the lowest and clearest side decks mid-ships and this is where the casualty should be brought back aboard. If the guard rails are wire, there should be rope lashings at one end so that the lower, or both, wires can be freed to make recovery easier. All crew members involved in recovery should be harnessed on if the sea conditions that led to the first fall could lead to further people ending up in the water. The answer to a person overboard is never for more people either to jump over to "help" them, or to fall in themselves by accident.

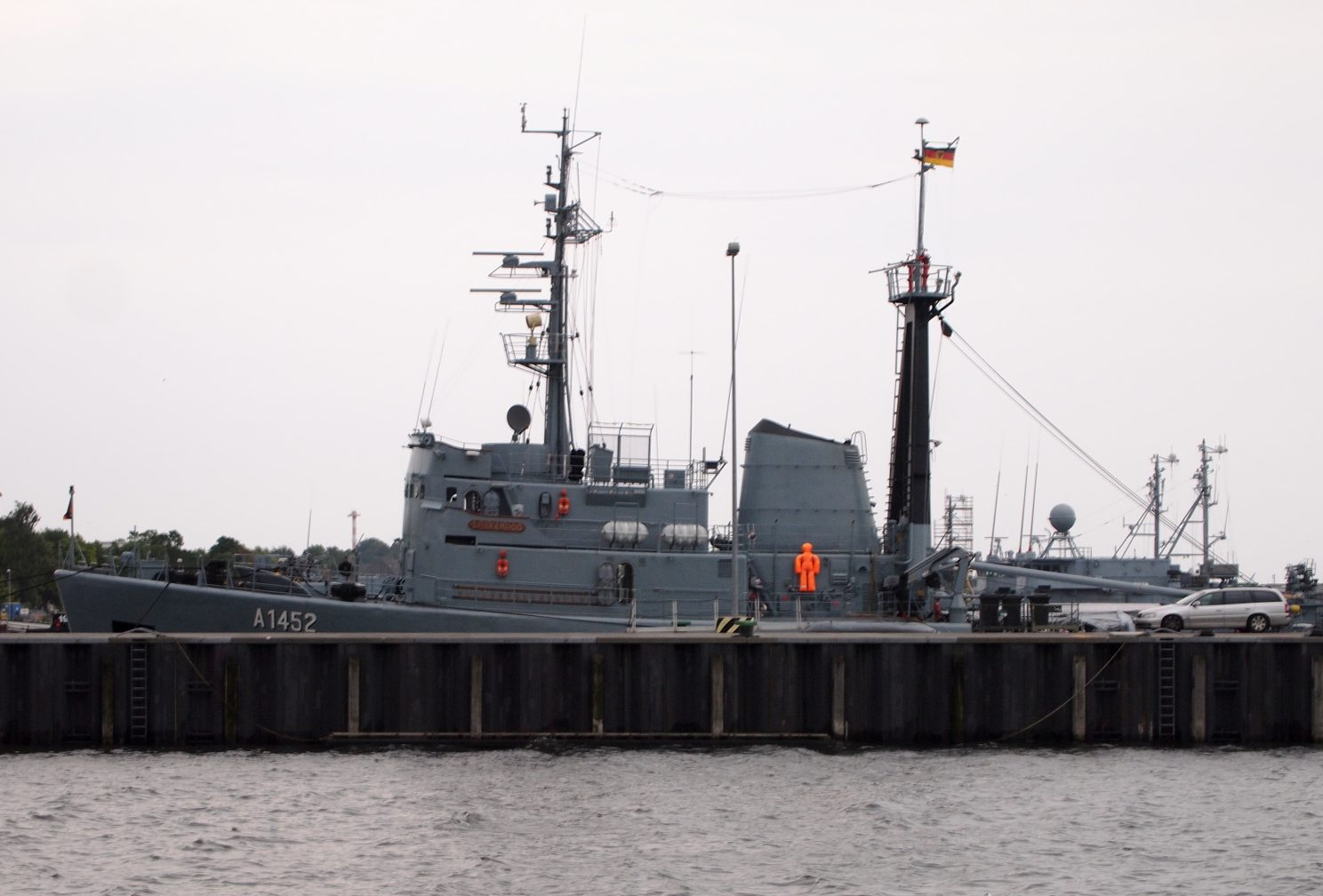
Dummies are used for man-overboard drills.

The recovery operation is different for a conscious versus an unconscious casualty, After a very short time in cold water, even a fit conscious person will have lost considerable strength and agility and will need help to get aboard, especially in heavy wet clothing. The condition of a person in the early stages of hypothermia can be made considerably worse by hoisting them vertically so that what circulation they have drains from their head into their feet. It is much better to recover the casualty as horizontally as possible. Various pieces of equipment are on the market to help short-handed or weakened crews deal with this problem, but really nothing beats the combined efforts of several strong hands gripping various items of clothing on the arms, body, and legs, and hauling in unison. In a rough sea, the waves that caused the fall can sometimes help by lifting the floating person up within easy reach of the sidedeck as the boat rolls. Care must be taken as to what to do as each wave subsides if the person is not yet aboard, as their weight can pull unsuspecting helpers in themselves. Loops of rope passed under the arms and behind the knees on one wave can be held during the trough and hauled again during the next rise, if this is possible.

A fitter casualty may climb a ladder more or less unaided, although the dangers of approaching the stern of the boat in a rough sea should be considered if that is where the only useful ladder is. A fitter casualty may be able to get a foot onto a simple loop of rope and lift themselves to the rail. A hypothermic, injured or unconscious victim may be quite incapable of helping themselves. In this case netting, slings, an inflatable dinghy or liferaft may be employed, with or without the additional assistance of a 4:1 or better tackle. Such a tackle may be fashioned from a mainsheet, a boom vang (kicking strap), or may be purpose-made for the job and stored in case needed. The yacht's winches may also be of assistance.

== Technology ==
Technology can also be used to assist in the retrieval of people who fall overboard. Many GPS chart plotters designed for marine use have a Man OverBoard (MOB) button. This button is pushed as soon as a Man Overboard alarm is raised, causing the plotter to record the latest known position of the person overboard. This allows the boat to be easily returned to the fallen crew member even if visual contact is lost.

Several manufacturers make man overboard alarms which can automatically detect a man overboard incident. The hardware consists of individual units worn by each crew member, and a base unit. Some systems are water activated: when an individual unit comes in contact with water, it sends a signal to the base unit, which sounds the man overboard alarm. Other automatic detection systems rely on a constant radio signal being transmitted between an individual unit and the base unit; passing outside the transmission range of the individual unit and/or falling into the water cause the radio signal to degrade severely, which makes the base unit sound the man overboard alarm. Some manufacturers' hardware integrates with other systems on the boat; for example, it may activate a throttle kill switch or control the autopilot to return to the point of the downed member.

== See also ==
- AIS-SART
- Automatic identification system
- Emergency locator beacon
- ENOS Rescue-System
- MOB boat
- Seamanship
- Search and rescue
