= Survival radio =

Small radios carried to facilitate rescue in an emergency

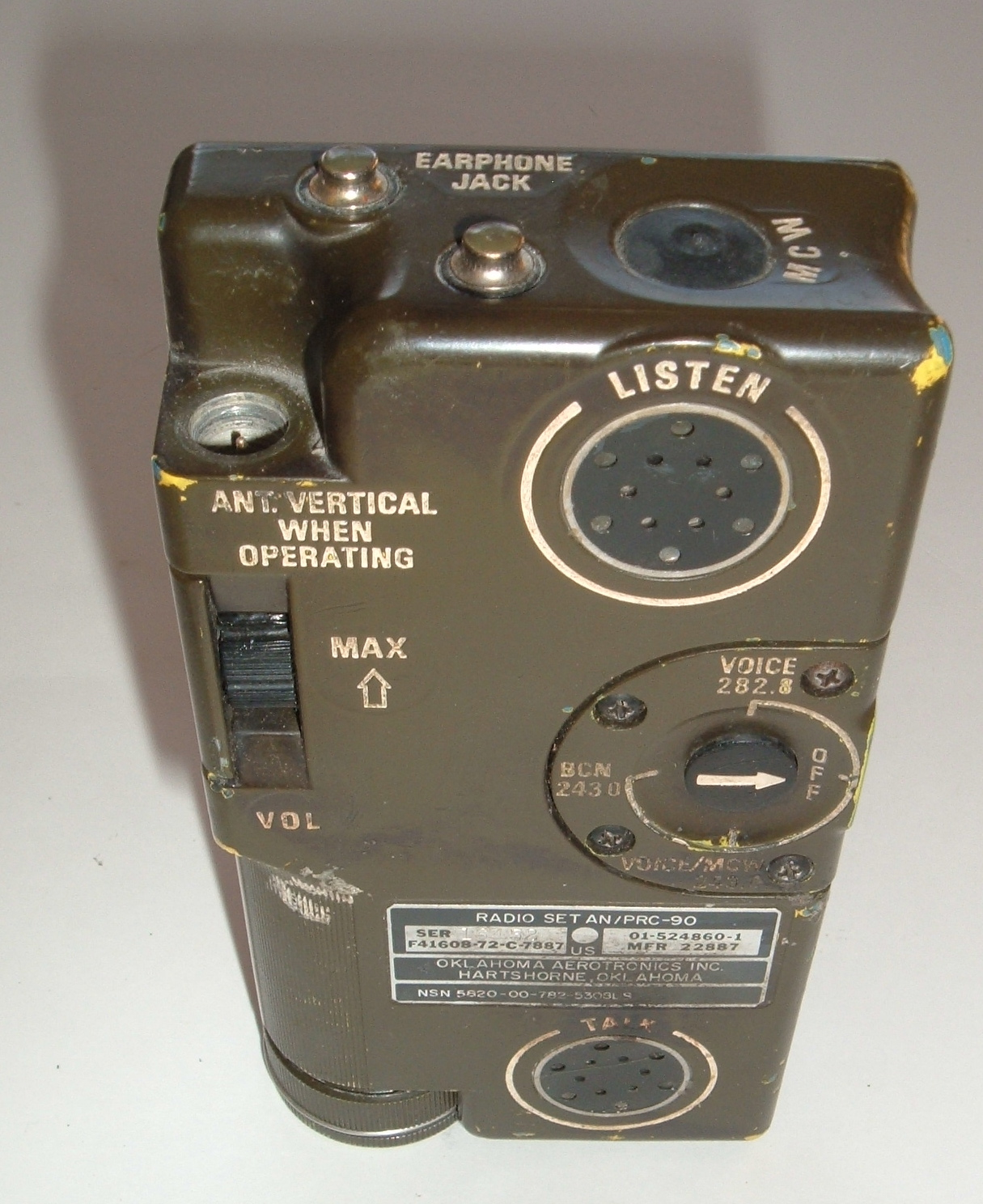
An AN/PRC-90 rescue radio

Survival radios are carried by pilots and search and rescue teams to facilitate rescue in an emergency. They are generally designed to transmit on international distress frequencies. Maritime systems have been standardized under the Global Maritime Distress Safety System. Civil and military organisations utilized different frequencies to communicate and no infringement on either sector would take place. For emergencies involving civilian aircraft, the radio frequency used is VHF 121.5 MHz and for military aircraft incidents, the frequency used is UHF 243 MHz.

== History ==
The use of radio to aid in rescuing survivors of accidents at sea came to the forefront after the sinking of the RMS Titanic in 1912. Lifeboats were equipped with spark gap transmitters such as the Marconi Type 241, c. 1920. These operated using Morse code on 500 kHz, the international distress frequency at the time. This frequency had the advantage of long range due to ground-wave propagation and was constantly monitored by all large ships at sea after the Titanic's sinking. However, due to its wavelength of 600 meters, a long antenna was required to achieve good range. Long wires on the order of 1/4 wavelength held up by kites or balloons were often used. Spark-gap continued to be used in lifeboats long after the technology was banned for general communication.

=== The Gibson Girl ===
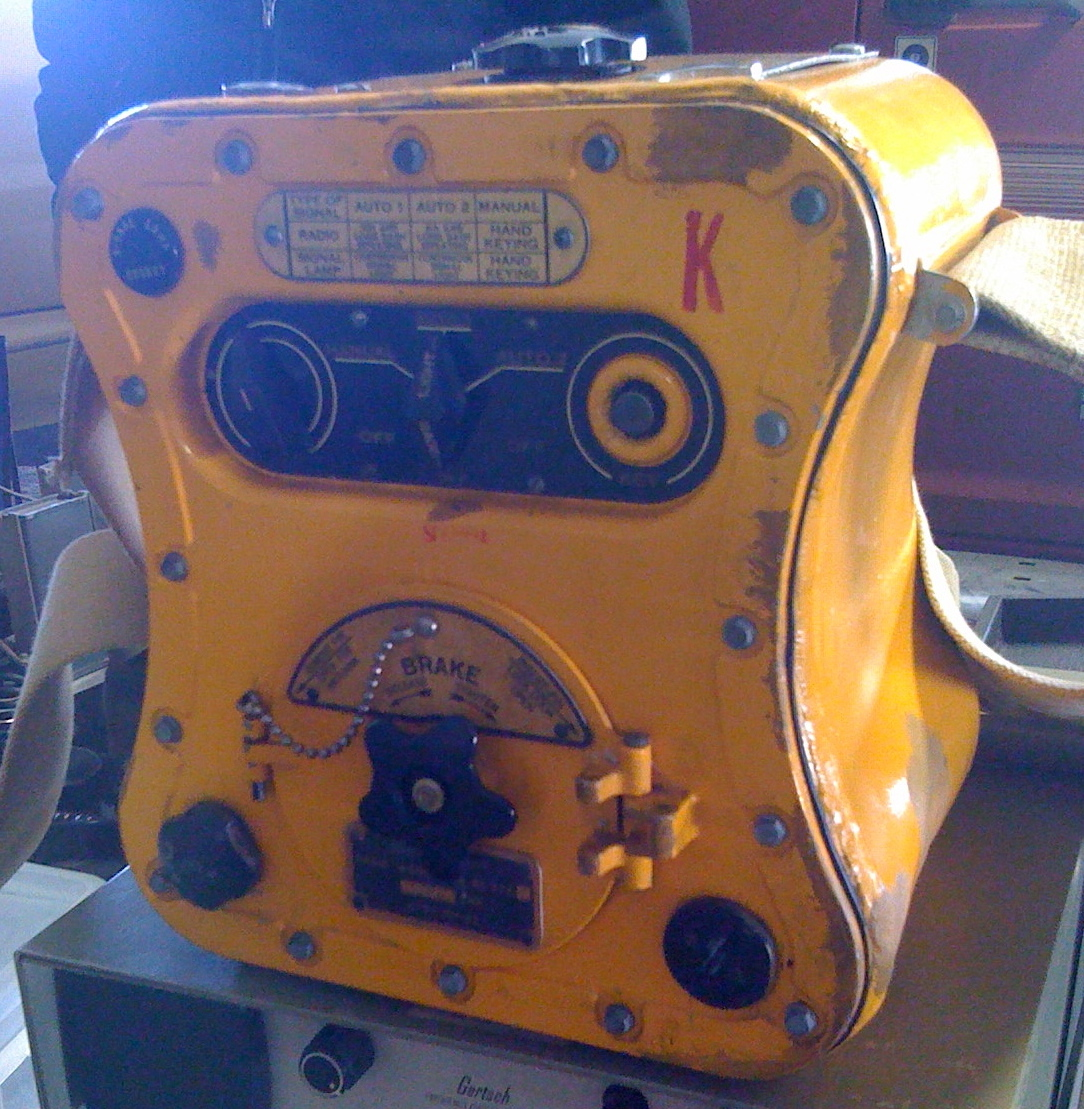
BC-778 "Gibson Girl" radio transmitter.

During World War II, Germany developed a hand-crank 500 kHz rescue radio, the "Notsender" (emergency transmitter) NS2. It used two vacuum tubes and was crystal-controlled. The radio case curved inward in the middle so that a user seated in an inflatable life boat could hold it stationary, between the thighs, while the generator handle was turned. The distress signal, in Morse code, was produced automatically as the crank handle was turned. An NS2 unit was captured by the British in 1941, who produced a copy, the Dinghy Transmitter Type T1333. Britain gave a second captured unit to the United States, which produced its own copy, the SCR-578. United States Army Air Forces aircraft carried the SCR-578 on over-water operations. Nicknamed the Gibson Girl because of its hourglass shape, it was supplied with a fold-up metal frame box kite, and a balloon with a small hydrogen generator, for which the flying line was the aerial wire. Power was provided by a hand cranked generator. The transmitter component was the BC-778. The frequency was 500 kHz at 4.8 watts, giving it a range of 200 miles (300 km; 200 nmi). Keying could be automatic SOS (including the 4-second long dash for autoalarm), or manual. Crystals for frequency control were a scarce item for the U.S. during the war and the SCR-578 was not crystal-controlled.

A post-World War II version, the AN/CRT-3, which added a frequency in the 8 MHz range, was in use by ships and civil aircraft until the mid-1970s.

=== VHF era ===
The use of aircraft for search and rescue in World War II brought line-of-sight VHF radios into use. The much shorter wavelengths of VHF allowed a simple dipole or whip antenna to be effective. Early devices included the British Walter, a compact single vacuum tube oscillator design operating at 177 MHz (1.7 meter wavelength), and the German Jäger (NS-4), a two-tube master oscillator power amplifier design at 58.5 and, later, 42 MHz. These were small enough to include in life rafts used on single-seat fighter aircraft.

Post-war designs included the British Search And Rescue And Homing beacon (SARAH) beacon made by Ultra Electronics, used in the location and recovery of astronaut Scott Carpenter after his Mercury space flight, the U.S. AN/URC-4 and the Soviet R 855U. These operated on the aircraft emergency frequencies of 121.5 and 243 MHz (2.5 and 1.2 meter wavelengths).

=== Automated beacon systems ===
After a light plane with two U.S. congressmen on board went down in 1972 and could not be found, the U.S. began requiring all aircraft to carry an Emergency Locator Transmitter (ELT) that would turn on automatically in the event of a crash. Initially these units sent beacon signals on the 121.5 MHz aircraft emergency frequency. These are being phased out in favor of ELTs that use a 406.025 MHz signal, which can be picked up by the Cospas-Sarsat international satellite system for search and rescue. Each 406 MHz beacon has a unique digital ID code. Users are required to register the code with the Cospas-Sarsat, allowing inquiries to be made when a distress signal is picked up. Some advanced models can transmit a location derived from an internal GPS or GLONASS receiver. Maritime practice has shifted from rescue radios on 500 kHz distress frequency (which is no longer officially monitored) to the Global Maritime Distress Safety System, which includes use of the Cospas-Sarsat system and other measures, including radar transponders and hand-held marine VHF radios.

There are many other types of emergency locator beacons that do not use the 406 MHz Cospas-Sarsat system, including man-overboard beacons that transmit Automatic identification system beacons and Avalanche transceivers.

== U.S. Military survival radios ==
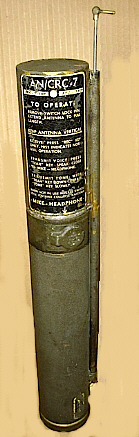
An AN/CRC-7 rescue radio

Military organizations still issue pilots and other combat personnel individual survival radios, which have become increasingly sophisticated, with built-in Distance Measuring Equipment (DME), Global Positioning Satellite (GPS) receivers, and satellite communication. In slang terms "PRC" radios were called a "Prick" followed by the model number, e.g. "Prick-25," and "URC" radios were called an "Erk." United States military survival radios include:

- AN/CRC-7 - World War II era set, 140.58 megahertz (2.1325 m)
- AN/PRC-17
- AN/PRC-32 - Navy rescue sets, 243 megahertz (1.23 m).
- AN/PRC-49
- AN/PRC-63 - Smallest set built.
- AN/PRC-90 - Vietnam War era airman rescue set. AN/PRC-90-1 and AN/PRC-90-2 are improved, repairable versions. Operates on 243 and 282.8 MHz AM. The PRC-90 also included a beacon mode, and a tone generator to allow the sending of Morse Code.
- AN/PRC-103 - (Air Force) Rescue Swimmer Radio.
- AN/PRC-112 - Offers Synthesized radio in the VHF and UHF aircraft bands. A PRC-112 and a hand held GPS were used by Capt. Scott O'Grady when he was rescued after being shot down over Bosnia. The AN/PRC-112B, initially known as the Hook-112, is a PRC-112 modified to include a GPS receiver, allowing encrypted position information to be sent. Also has Cospas-Sarsat beacon. The latest model AN/PRC-112G, built by General Dynamics can communicate with satellites as well. Over 31,000 radios in the PRC-112 family have been produced.
- AN/PRC-125 (Navy) Rescue Swimmer Radio.
- AN/PRC-149 Rescue Radio, replaced the PRC-90, PRC-112 and PRC-125 for non-combat use. Includes GPS and Cospas-Sarsat beacon. Operates on 121.5 megahertz (2.47 m), 243.0 megahertz (1.234 m), 282.8 megahertz (1.060 m) and 406.025 megahertz (0.738360 m). Built by Tadiran, the PRC-149 uses standard D cell batteries, unlike other units that took special batteries.
- AN/PRQ-7 Combat Survivor/Evader Locator (CSEL) combines selective availability GPS, UHF line of sight and UHF satellite communications along with a SARSAT beacon. It can send predefined messages digitally along with the user's location. As of 2008, the PRQ-7 cost $7000 each. A rechargeable lithium-ion battery pack cost $1600, while a non-rechargeable lithium-manganese dioxide unit cost $1520. As of Oct, 2011 Boeing has delivered 50,000 PRQ-7s.
- AN/URC-4 - Operates at 121.5 megahertz (2.47 m) and 243 megahertz (1.23 m)
- AN/URC-11 - Operating at 243 megahertz (1.23 m), "A" versions replaced one audio tube with transistors.
- AN/URC-10 - Subminiaturized, completely transistorized UHF radio sets consisting of a crystal-controlled receiver-transmitter, a 16-volt dry battery, and a power cable assembly. The unit operates on one channel in the 240–260 megahertz (1.2–1.2 m) band, usually at 243 megahertz (1.23 m).
- AN/URC-14 - Operates at 121.5 megahertz (2.47 m)
- AN/URC-64 - (Air Force), 4 frequency rescue sets. Four crystal controlled channels between 225–285 megahertz (1.33–1.05 m)
- AN/URC-68 - (Army), 4 frequency rescue sets.

== See also ==
- Emergency locator beacon
- Emergency position-indicating radiobeacon station
- Distress signal
- Global Maritime Distress Safety System
- Search and Rescue Transponder
- Joint Electronics Type Designation System
- List of military electronics of the United States
