= ENOS Rescue-System =

Electronic rescue and locating system for use by divers at sea

ENOS stands for "Elektronisches Notruf- und Ortungssystem" – "Electronic Rescue and Location System" - a system developed in Germany for use by divers at sea. ENOS allows people in distress to signal their location when drifting on the ocean's surface so they can be quickly located and rescued. Although the system was especially developed for scuba diving it can also be used for other water sports like windsurfing, jet skiing, sailing and boating.

== Assembly and operation ==
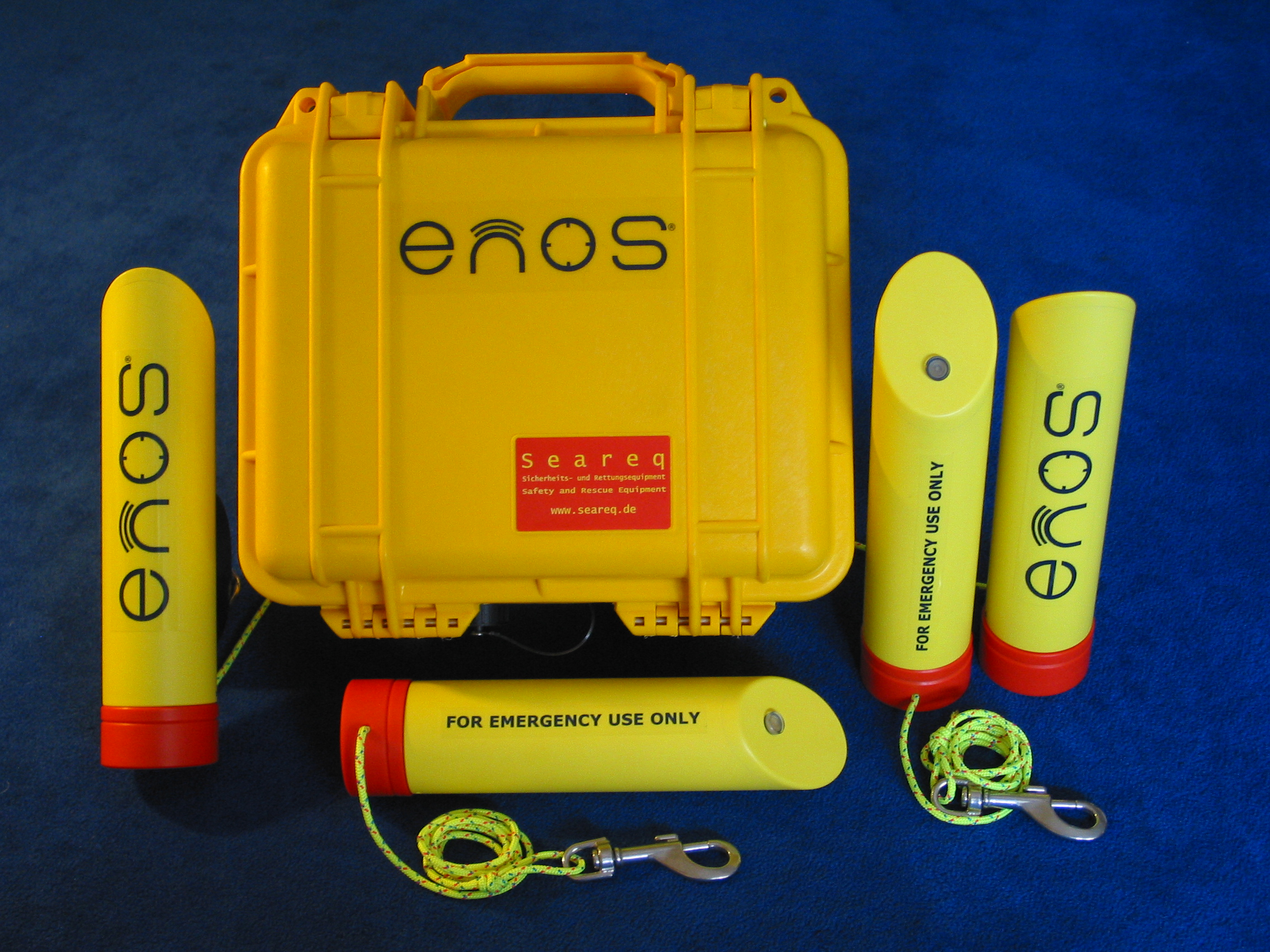
ENOS-System, here with 1 receiver and 4 transmitters

Each ENOS unit consists of two parts. The ENOS-Receiver which is kept on board the dive boat; and the ENOS-Transmitter(s) carried by the diver(s). ENOS is designed for emergencies associated with a diver(s) surfacing too far from the boat to swim back. For example, when divers have been swept away from their vessel by a current or when they can't see the boat because of poor weather. To send an emergency signal, the diver switches on the transmitter. This will send the signal and the diver's GPS position back to the boat's receiver. When the receiver picks up the diver's alert, it automatically determines the boat's GPS position and calculates the vessel's distance and bearing to the diver's position. The results are clearly plotted on screen for the skipper to follow during the rescue.

== Technology and receiving range ==
Every ENOS is a self-contained rescue system that functions in a local area. Its range is determined by the height of the receiving antenna mounted on the dive boat, the prevailing surface conditions and the distance of the direct line-of-sight. Receiving ranges of up to three nautical miles are standard. A range of up to six nautical miles is possible in optimal conditions. The system uses radio frequencies that do not require licenses or fees; and are determined by the national laws of radio frequencies where the system is operating. It does not use the international distress frequency. ENOS is the only rescue system for water sports which relays the GPS position of the diver in distress directly to a local receiving unit. The alert is not relayed to coast guards or other marine rescue organisations. The receiver is alerted immediately which enables the nearby boat to quickly and independently initiate the diver rescue and bear the costs. A single ENOS-Receiver can receive alerts from all the ENOS-Transmitters operating on the same frequency within the same receiving range.

== Other rescue systems ==
The ENOS-System is not intended to replace existing distress radio beacons or rescue systems (e.g. EPIRBs, ELTs, PLBs, Inmarsat etc.), which operate on international emergency frequencies and over large distances.

== Circulation ==
The ENOS-System was developed in Rösrath, Germany in 2004. It can be used anywhere in the world and is currently operating on dive boats in Egypt, Ecuador / Galápagos, European Union, Maldives, and Seychelles.

== See also ==
A collection of press releases about the ENOS-System

- Global Positioning System – American satellite-based radio navigation service
- Emergency position-indicating radiobeacon – Distress radio beacon, a tracking transmitter that is triggered during an accident
