= Aircraft emergency frequency =

Emergency aeronautical frequency

The aircraft emergency frequency (also known in the USA as Guard) is a frequency used on the aircraft band reserved for emergency communications for aircraft in distress. The frequencies are 121.5 MHz for civilian, also known as International Air Distress (IAD), International Aeronautical Emergency Frequency, or VHF Guard, and 243.0 MHz—the second harmonic of VHF guard—for military use, also known as Military Air Distress (MAD), NATO Combined Distress and Emergency Frequency, or UHF Guard. Earlier emergency locator transmitters (ELTs / EPIRBs) used the guard frequencies to transmit. As of February 1, 2009 satellite monitoring of the 121.5 and 243 MHz ELT (EPIRB) frequencies ceased, whereas an additional band from 406.0 to 406.1 MHz is now used exclusively by modern emergency locator transmitters (EPIRB).

== History ==
The choice of 121.5 MHz was made by ICAO in conjunction with ARINC and the ITU.

== Monitoring ==
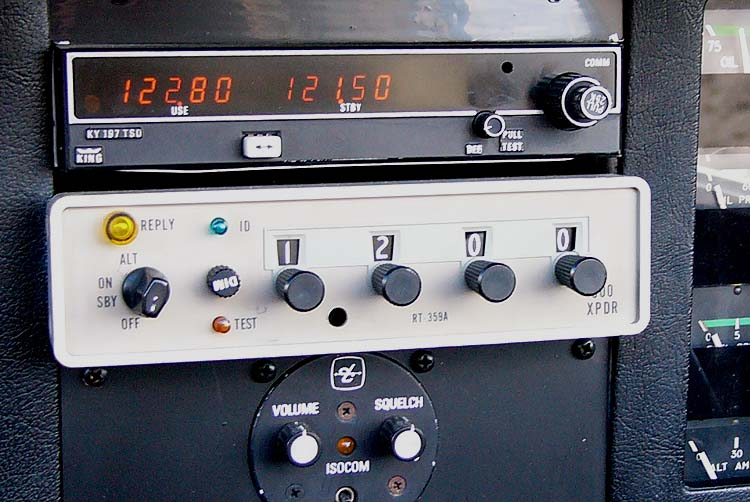
Bendix/King radio on 121.5 standby

In the United States, the emergency frequency is monitored by most air traffic control towers, FSS services, national air traffic control centers, military air defense and other flight and emergency services, as well as by many commercial aircraft. The notice to airmen FDC 4/4386 requires "…all aircraft operating in United States National Airspace, if capable, shall maintain a listening watch on VHF GUARD 121.5 or UHF 243.0."

In the UK, 121.5 MHz is monitored by the Royal Air Force Distress and Diversion cells (known as "D&D") at the London Terminal Control Centre and the Shanwick Oceanic Control, from a nationwide network of antennas. Depending on the aircraft's altitude and location, the personnel in the centres may be able to use triangulation to determine its exact position which can be useful to the pilot if the aircraft is lost or "temporarily unsure of position".

== Use ==
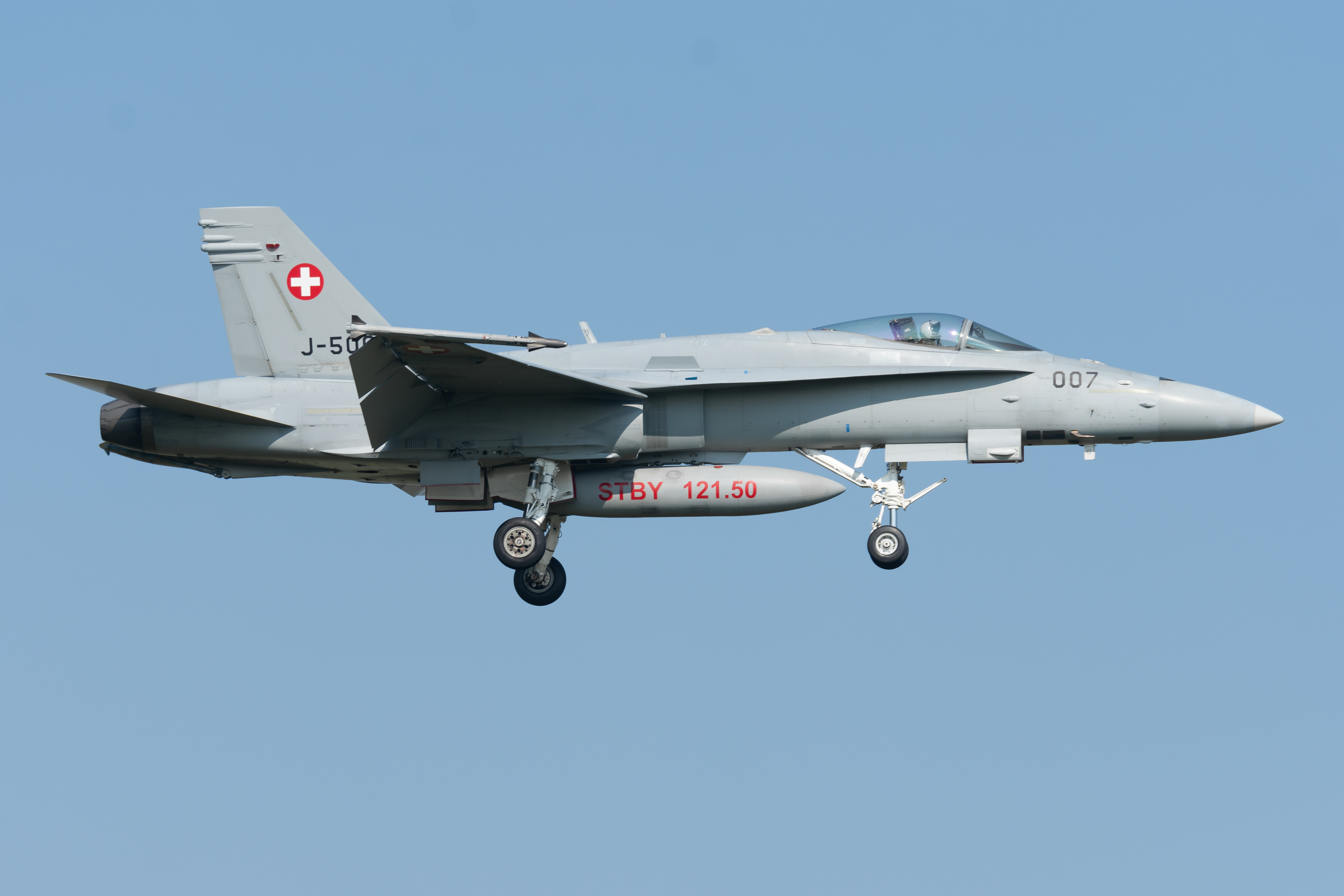
A Swiss Air Force F/A-18 Hornet fighter with the order STBY 121.50 written on its external tank

Both guard frequencies can be used by any aircraft in distress or experiencing an emergency and in addition it can be used by air traffic control to warn aircraft if they are about to fly into restricted or prohibited airspace.

Guard frequencies can be used for distress calls, such as Mayday calls, and urgency calls, such as Pan-pan calls.

Aircraft will also be contacted on 121.5 MHz when intercepted by air defence aircraft, to ask for identification and intentions and to pass on instructions.

=== Channel misuse and enforcement ===
ICAO Annex 10, Volume V, § 4.1.3.1.1 states "the emergency channel (121.5 MHz) shall be used only for genuine emergency purposes".

A misuse of the frequency can result in punishment. In the United States, Federal Communications Commission (FCC) rules prohibit false distress calls and superfluous communications. If the FCC Enforcement Bureau identifies an individual breaking these rules, they can be subject to a fine of up to $19,246 for a single violation and up to $144,344 for an ongoing violation. FCC may also confiscate radio equipment and file for criminal charges.

However, it is also common for pilots in the US to meow or otherwise make animal noises on the frequency. This practice has been controversial among pilots and air traffic controllers, with the Federal Aviation Administration (FAA) moving to investigate an April 2026 meowing incident on two regional airliners at Ronald Reagan Washington National Airport.

In the United Kingdom, pilots may make "Practice PAN" or "Training Fix" calls. Practice Mayday calls are not permitted.

== Locating beacons ==
Modulation of a radio beacon of distress
Transmission of a distress beacon on 121.5 MHz and 243 MHz

Older emergency locator transmitters transmit on 121.5 MHz in case of impact. Newer ELTs transmit on 406 MHz, with a low power beacon on 121.5 MHz for local homing. Satellites listen for the signals and alert local personnel to the emergency, and the beacon allows search and rescue to find the scene of the accident faster. Beacons operating at 406 MHz are encoded, allowing the vessel of origin to be determined and false alarms to be quickly verified. Satellite support for the 121.5 MHz–only (and 243 MHz) versions was discontinued in early 2009.

== See also ==
- Air-ground radiotelephone service
- Airband
- Distress signal
- Mayday
- Transponder (aeronautics)
