= Emergency locator beacon =

Radio-frequency beacon used to locate airplanes, vessels, and persons in distress

An emergency locator beacon is a radio beacon, a portable battery powered radio transmitter, used to locate airplanes, vessels, and persons in distress and in need of immediate rescue. Various types of emergency locator beacons are carried by aircraft, ships, vehicles, hikers and cross-country skiers. In case of an emergency, such as the aircraft crashing, the ship sinking, or a hiker becoming lost, the transmitter is deployed and begins to transmit a continuous radio signal, which is used by search and rescue teams to quickly find the emergency and render aid. The purpose of all emergency locator beacons is to help rescuers find survivors within the so-called "golden day", the first 24 hours following a traumatic event, during which the majority of survivors can usually be saved.

== Beacon types ==
=== COSPAS-SARSAT 406 MHz Distress Beacons ===
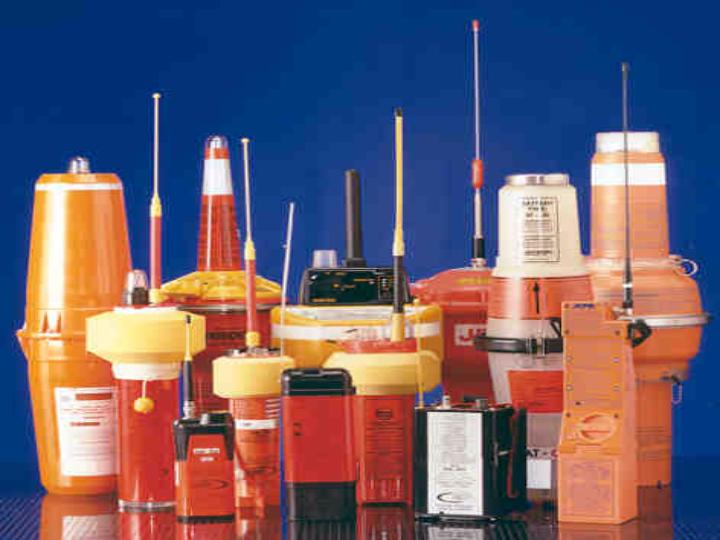
First generation EPIRB emergency locator beacons

Cospas-Sarsat is an international humanitarian consortium of governmental and private agencies which acts as a worldwide dispatcher for search and rescue operations. It operates a network of about 47 satellites carrying radio receivers, which detect distress signals from emergency locator beacons anywhere on Earth transmitting on the international Cospas distress frequency of 406 MHz. The satellites calculate the geographic location of the beacon within 2 km by measuring the Doppler frequency shift of the radio waves due to the relative motion of the transmitter and the satellite, and quickly transmit the information to the appropriate local first responder organizations, which perform the search and rescue.

Defined officially as emergency position-indicating radiobeacon stations in the ITU Radio Regulations (Section IV. Radio Stations and Systems – Article 1.93), these transmit a coded data burst once every 50 seconds, conforming to the C/S T.001 Specification for Cospas-Sarsat 406 MHz Distress Beacons, compatible with the Cospas-Sarsat satellite receivers. The different types include:

- ELTs (emergency locator transmitters) signal aircraft distress
- EPIRBs (emergency position-indicating radio beacons) signal maritime distress
- SEPIRBs (submarine emergency position-indicating radio beacons) are EPIRBs designed only for use on submarines
- SSASes (ship security alert system) are used to indicate possible piracy or terrorism attacks on sea-going vessels
- PLBs (personal locator beacons) are for personal use and are intended to indicate a person in distress who is away from normal emergency services; e.g., 9-1-1. They are also used for crewsaving applications in shipping and lifeboats at terrestrial systems. In New South Wales, Australia, some police stations and the National Parks and Wildlife Service provide personal locator beacons to hikers for no charge. Many countries around the world do not allow PLB for personal use, require license or have restrictions on use.

=== Auxiliary maritime beacons ===
- ENOS Rescue-System
  - A rescue beacon system designed for use by divers who have drifted away from their dive boats.
- Search and rescue transponder (SART)
  - A specialized radar beacon (RACON) that emits a string of 12 dots (replaced by arcs and circles when closer) for display on an X-band radar screen when scanned.

=== Man-overboard beacons ===
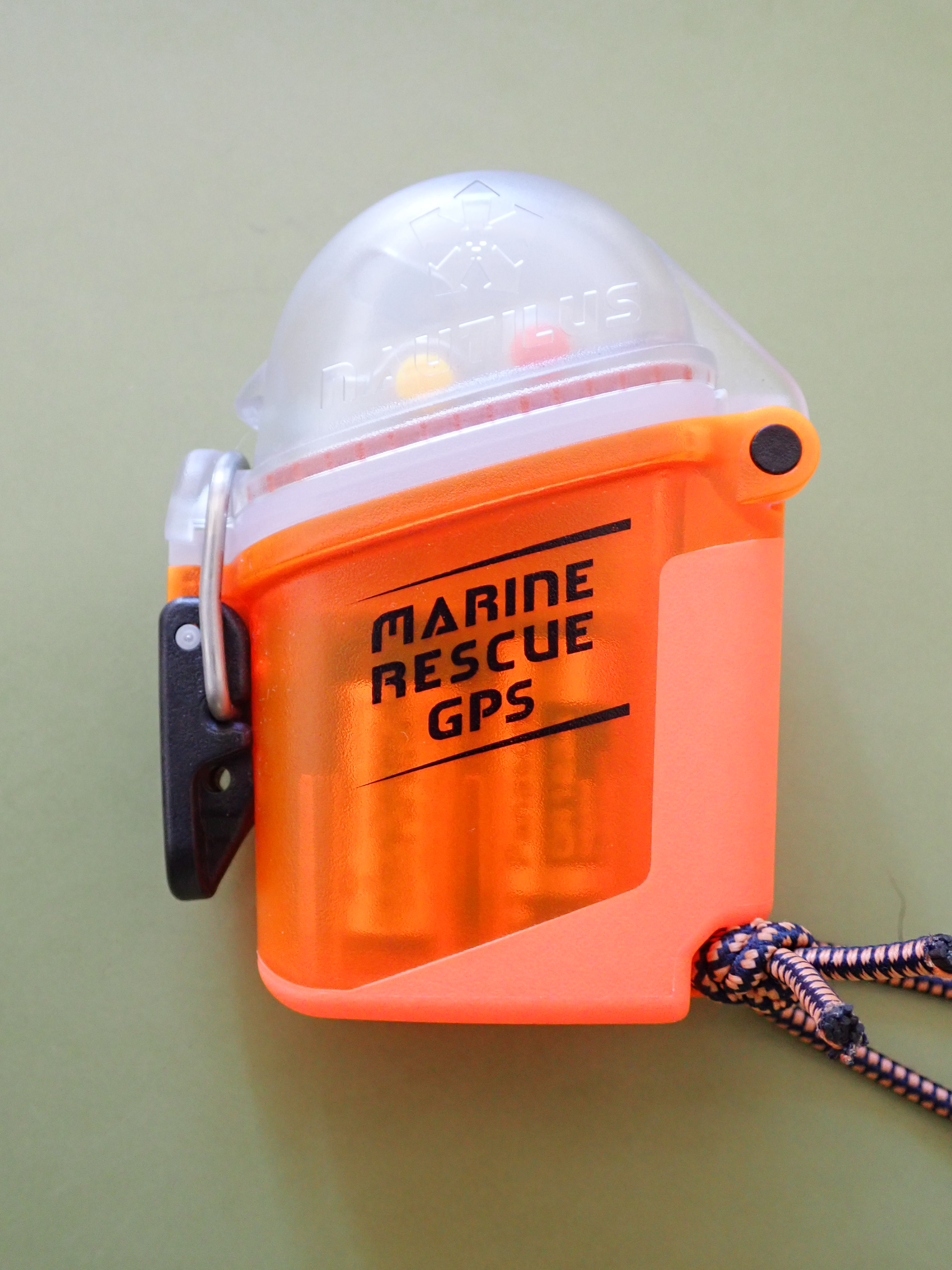
Personal locator beacon for divers - sealed for immersion

- MSLDs (Maritime Survivor Locating Devices) are man-overboard signalling devices, first standardized in 2016.
  - A Maritime Survivor Locator Device (MSLD) is a man-overboard locator beacon. In the U.S., rules were established in 2016 in 47 C.F.R. Part 95. A MSLD may transmit on 121.500 MHz, or one of these: 156.525 MHz, 156.750 MHz, 156.800 MHz, 156.850 MHz, 161.975 MHz, 162.025 MHz (bold are Canadian-required frequencies).
- AIS-SART
  - A hand-held automatic identification system (AIS) transmitter that emits only an emergency beacon. It does not have a receiver and thus cannot be a transponder.

=== SEND—Satellite Emergency Notification Devices ===
- SPOT
- inReach
- Spidertracks
- Yellowbrick
- Somewear Global Hotspot

=== Avalanche beacons ===
- RECCO
- Avalanche transceiver

=== Other beacons ===
- Mountain Locator Unit
- Automatic Packet Reporting System
- Crash position indicator
- Transponder (aeronautics)
  - Can be used as an emergency beacon of sorts by setting it to squawk 7700, the distress code

== See also ==
- Survival radio – Small radios carried to facilitate rescue in an emergency
- Direction finding – Measurement of the direction from which a received signal was transmitted
- Global Maritime Distress and Safety System – Worldwide emergency communication system for ships at sea
- LoJack – Device for tracking vehicles when stolen
- Search and rescue – Search for and provision of aid to people who are in distress or imminent danger
- Survival craft station
- Emergency position-indicating radiobeacon station – Distress radio beacon, a tracking transmitter that is triggered during an accident
