= Școala Superioară de Aviație Civilă Flight 111 =

2014 light aircraft crash in Romania

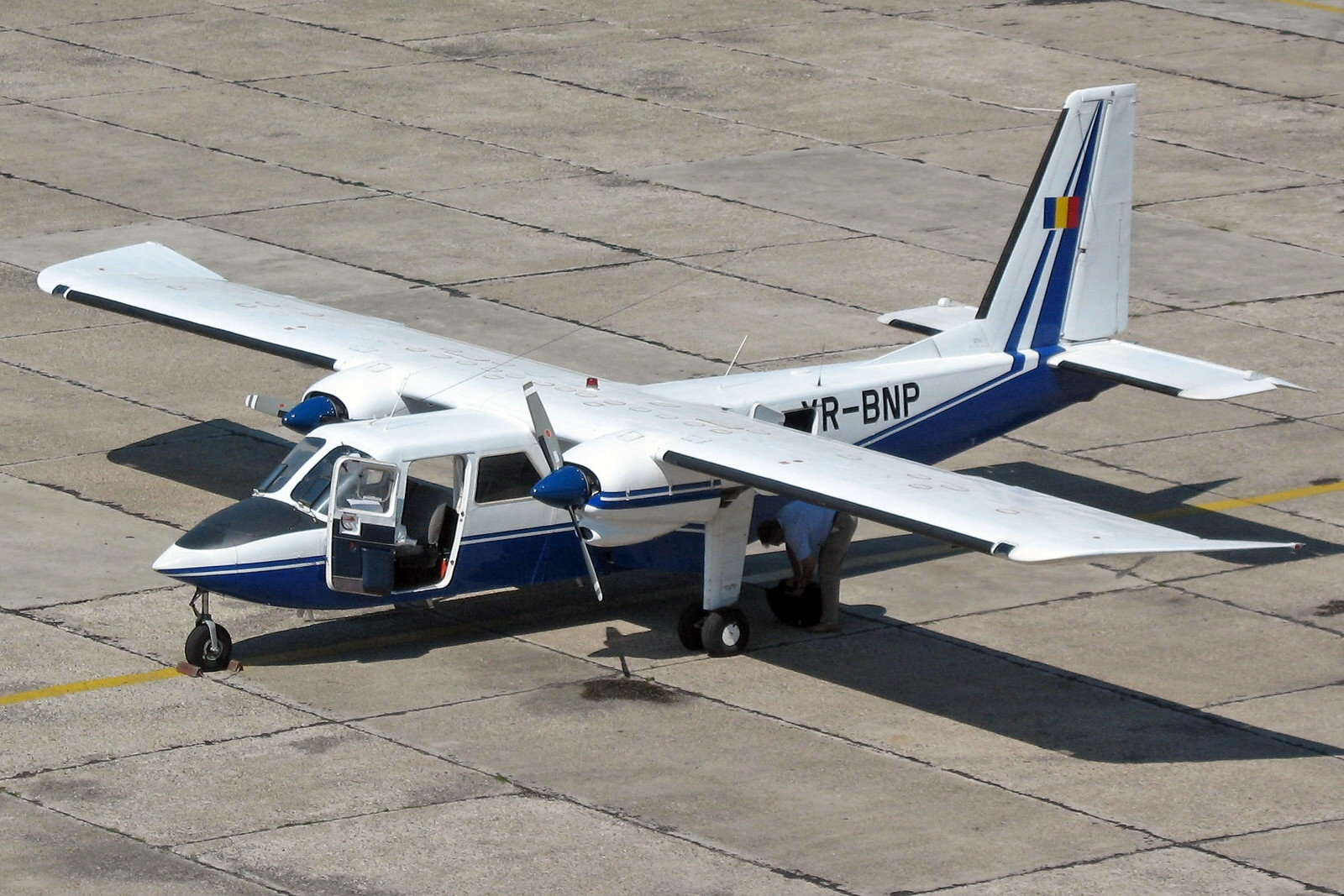
- YR-BNP, the aircraft involved in the crash, in 2008

Accident
- Date: 20 January 2014
- Summary: Dual engine failure due to atmospheric icing
- Site: Petreasa, Horea, Alba County, Romania; 46°33′16″N 22°58′49″E

Aircraft
- Aircraft type: Britten-Norman BN-2A-27 Islander
- Operator: Școala Superioară de Aviație Civilă
- Registration: YR-BNP
- Flight origin: Bucharest, Romania
- Destination: Oradea, Bihor County, Romania
- Occupants: 7
- Passengers: 5
- Crew: 2
- Fatalities: 2
- Injuries: 5
- Survivors: 5

On 20 January 2014, Școala Superioară de Aviație Civilă Flight 111, a Britten-Norman Islander operated by Romania's Superior School of Aviation (Romanian: Școala Superioară de Aviație Civilă), crashed in the Apuseni Mountains, at an altitude of approximately 1,400 metres (4,600 ft), near the village of Petreasa, Romania. The aircraft was transporting a five-person medical team from Bucharest to Oradea. The captain and a medical student died while the copilot and four doctors survived injured.

An investigation conducted by the Center for Investigation and Analysis for Civil Aviation Security (Romanian: Centrul de Investigații și Analiză pentru Siguranța Aviației Civile) concluded in October 2015 that the cause of the accident was the shutdown of both engines as a result of icing affecting the carburetors.

The analysis of the search and rescue operation on the victims made late, highlighted a series of deficiencies in the Romanian emergency service that manages emergencies in the country, deficiencies that include some regulations or specific procedures, including poor communication between the responsible institutions. As a result, several executives of the structures responsible for search and rescue of victims have resigned or been fired.

== Accident ==
Location of Alba County in Romania

The aircraft, property of the Superior School of Civil Aviation in Romania, took off at 13:35 from Aurel Vlaicu International Airport in Bucharest and was bound for Oradea International Airport, where it should have landed at 16:35. The flight was a humanitarian mission and was piloted by Răzvan Petrescu. On board were Dr Radu Zamfir from Fundeni Hospital, Dr Valentin Calu from Elias Hospital, Dr Cătălin Pivniceru from Saint Mary Hospital, Dr Sorin Ianceu from the municipal hospital in Beiuș, and Aurelia Ion, a student at the Military Medical Institute in Bucharest. The team were to collect organs from a donor for a transplant operation.

The accident happened in poor weather conditions and the crew was flying according to instrument flight rules.

One of the passengers, Dr Zamfir, reported the crash at 16:16 in a telephone call to the 112 emergency service. The Inspectorate for Emergency Situations Alba, part of the Romanian General Inspectorate for Emergency Situations and the team of The National Association of Mountain Rescuers of Romania (Salvamont) headquarters of Cluj was assigned to the rescue operation. Over 70 firefighters and policemen from the counties of Cluj, Bihor, and Alba and approximately 200 locals took part in the search for the wreck. The rescue team had difficulty finding the crash site: they did not know the precise location and the area was covered in snow and thick fog. Because of the fog, the SMURD helicopter from Mureș could not be used.

The pilot and the student died and the copilot was in a critical state, doctors Valentin Calu, Cătălin Pivniceru and Sorin Ianceu had multiple bone fractures; Dr Zamfir had no severe wounds, and was able to help other survivors. All injured were taken to the Emergency Hospital in Cluj (Spitalul Clinic Județean de Urgență Cluj) and were admitted to the Intensive Care Unit.

== Search operations ==
Emergency search and rescue services were delayed because they did not receive the proper coordinates of the crash site. The ELT distress beacon operated correctly, but search and rescue services could not locate the beacon on the ground, on 121.5 MHz. Moscow Mission Control Centre said that they did not receive any signal from Romania on 406 MHz during the incident.

Serviciul de Telecomunicaţii Speciale said that it could not precisely locate the crash site because it had not received GPS coordinates of Dr Zamfir's phone from his mobile phone service provider, who provided only the cell, which covered an area of 200 km^{2} (77 sq mi). Using its internal GPS reference, Dr Zamfir's phone showed coordinates 46.6023°N 22.9842°E, at 3.3 miles (5.3 km) North of the actual site of the crash 46.554383°N 22.980338°E.

The main controversy in this accident was why all methods used to locate the crash site failed, delaying the search and rescue teams.

== Aircraft ==
The aircraft involved was a Britten-Norman BN-2A-27 Islander, registration YR-BNP.

== Passengers ==
The passengers involved are:

Valentin Calu (42 years old) — doctor in medical sciences and was working as a surgeon at Elias Hospital in Bucharest and from 2007 was the spokesperson for the health unit. He was previously the coordinator of the Emergency Department at Elias Hospital. He was part of the medical team who worked for the Romanian National program for transplants.

Pavel Constantin Cătălin Pivniceru (46 years old) — general surgery specialist at Saint Mary Hospital in Bucharest and spokesperson for that hospital.

Radu Zamfir (39 years old) — graduated from the Carol Davila Medical University in 1998. He was a general surgeon at Fundeni Hospital in the laboratory of surgical research. He performed transplants together with Prof Dr Irinel Popescu at the Fundeni General Surgery and Liver Transplant Center.

Sorin Ianceu (37 years old) — surgeon at the municipal hospital in Beiuș and part of transplant team of Oradea County Emergency Clinical Hospital. Ianceu had graduated from the Iuliu Hațieganu University of Medicine and Pharmacy and specialized in transplants.

== Victims ==
=== Aurelia Ion ===
Aurelia Ion was a fifth-year officer student at the Military Medical Institute of the Carol Davila University of Medicine and Pharmacy in Bucharest and she was a trainee at the Fundeni Hospital. She died at the scene of the accident. Hypothermia was listed as the cause of her death. (The body temperature recorded when she was found by SMURD paramedics was 18.6 °C.)

During her years of study, Aurelia Ion had volunteered in various medical activities. She was described by those who were close to her as a "a model girl, dedicated to her profession, an exceptional child, with big dreams". The coordinator of transplant Victor Zota affirmed that she had also participated in organ harvesting, volunteered, and "was dedicated to her profession in a way that is rare to find".

Minister of National Defence, Mircea Dușa, ordered posthumous promotion of Aurelia Ion from the rank of second lieutenant to lieutenant. She was buried with military honors in the military section of Ghencea Cemetery, with the presence of Mircea Dușa.

=== Adrian Iovan ===
Adrian Iovan was at that time one of the most experienced pilots in Romania. He graduated from the Aurel Vlaicu Aviation High School, then the Faculty of Aeronautics as first in his class. He flew IAR 823, An-2, BN-2, Il-18, Boeing 737 (over 10,000 hours) and Piper PA-34, with over 15,000 of total flight hours. After the retirement, flew Piper and BN-2 aircraft.

Adrian Iovan was buried with military honors at Catholic Bellu Cemetery, but according to the canons of the Orthodox Church, next to his father.

== Investigation ==
The Romanian Government announced the start of two investigations. The first would look at the accident and the second the procedures followed by the rescue teams, which reached the scene only several hours after the crash. The Attorney General of Romania, Tiberiu Nițu, said he was considering investigating the authorities' handling of the plane crash.

In addition to the investigations of aeronautical authorities, two investigations were also opened by Prosecutor's office of the Court of Appeal of Alba Iulia regarding the violations of own duties by personnel of Romanian civil aviation or the failure to comply with the same and to personal injuries caused by negligence. The Prosecutor General of the Prosecutor's Office of the Court of Appeal of Alba Iulia, Augustin Lazăr, declared that the airplane was not equipped with a flight recorder and that the other flight instruments will be examined to check that are working correctly.

In a preliminary investigation report, the Center for Investigation and Analysis for Civil Aviation Security (Romanian: Centrul de Investigații și Analiză pentru Siguranța Aviației Civile) (CIAS) said that the ELT distress beacon was type ARTEX C406-2. This beacon transmitting on frequencies 121.5 MHz, 243 MHz (now obsolete) and 406 MHz, using two different cables for antennas. The cable for 406 MHz antenna was not found at the crash scene, which explains why no signal received on 406 MHz.

=== Flight ===
The CIAS final report stated that Adrian Iovan was the crew captain, responsible for all decisions. Iovan's total flight experience at the time was 15,261 hours and 10 minutes, of which only 42 hours and 17 minutes were in Britten-Norman Islander aircraft, while Petrescu's was 886 hours and 12 minutes, of which only 21 hours and 35 minutes were on the Islander. For 11 months, from February 6, 2013, when the aircraft involved was grounded for an overhaul, both pilots (Iovan and Petrescu) did not carry out any flight activity, but this interruption was within the legal limits. Both pilots had much more experience on MEP-class aircraft, but of the Piper PA-34 Seneca type with fuel-injected engines rather than carbureted engines. The limited experience of both men favored poor decisions. Iovan entrusted the duties of pilot flying (PF) to Răzvan Petrescu, assigning him the left seat, the normal flying position on an airplane. Usually, this position was to be occupied by the captain, who was actually supposed to piloting but this was not mandatory. The scheme adopted by Adrian Iovan was later considered even superior for flights in difficult conditions, precisely because it allows the commander to concentrate on analyzing the situation and decision making.

The navigation was carried out with a portable GPS system, without utilizing VOR, DME and ADF systems installed on board (not because GPS system was more advanced). With the absence of a flight recorder, the memory of the GPS system allowed the reconstruction of the flight profile. The flight plan called for a flight on instruments at flight level 120 (12,000 feet = 3,600 meters) flight level that would never have been reached.

At the start of the day, the weather conditions at Bucharest Băneasa Aurel Vlaicu International Airport did not allow the takeoff. The conditions improved at 13:00 and the captain decided to make the flight, although the weather bulletins indicated conditions favorable for ice formation. After the takeoff, it was discovered that the airplane climb rate was slow, the cause indicated on the final report was the very high weight and the poor balance. Following previous test flights, it was discovered that the airplane had too much fuel on board, but dumping some of it would have delayed takeoff. In reality, the effective weight was slightly below the maximum allowed, but exceeded the allowed weight according to the standard calculating method, that provides 96 kg for men and 78 kg for women. After boarding, the passengers sat as they liked, doctors Calu, Pivniceru and Ianceu in the second and third rows, and Doctor Zamfir and student Aurelia Ion in the fifth and last rows. This arrangement placed the center of gravity too far forward, outside the centerline area, resulting in a nose-heavy aircraft with increased aerodynamic drag. However, the report established that a correct centerline would not have been possible by simply seating the passengers.

After takeoff, the airplane's climb was slow, initially unable to reach flight level 100, which suggests that the ice formation problems were present from the very beginning. During the crossing of the Southern Carpathians (in relation to which the permitted level is 105), the Romanian Regional Control Center (ACC) asks them to climb, approving level 110 (normally intended for opposite traffic, but usable if the lack of opposite traffic allowed). The answer from Iovan was that he would respect the flight level, but with a rate of climb very low. Since they were below the permitted level and were not climbing, the situation became ambiguous, because it was not clear if they are flying according to instrumental flight rules, in that case the responsibility was of the ACC, or if the flight passed to visual flight rules, in that case the responsibility came all on the captain. For every eventuality, the ACC reported that barometric pressure (QNH) was 1006 hPa, a necessary information for setting up the altimeters for a VFR flight, but the pilots did not confirm the VFR flight nor set the altimeters, so they considered flying in IFR.

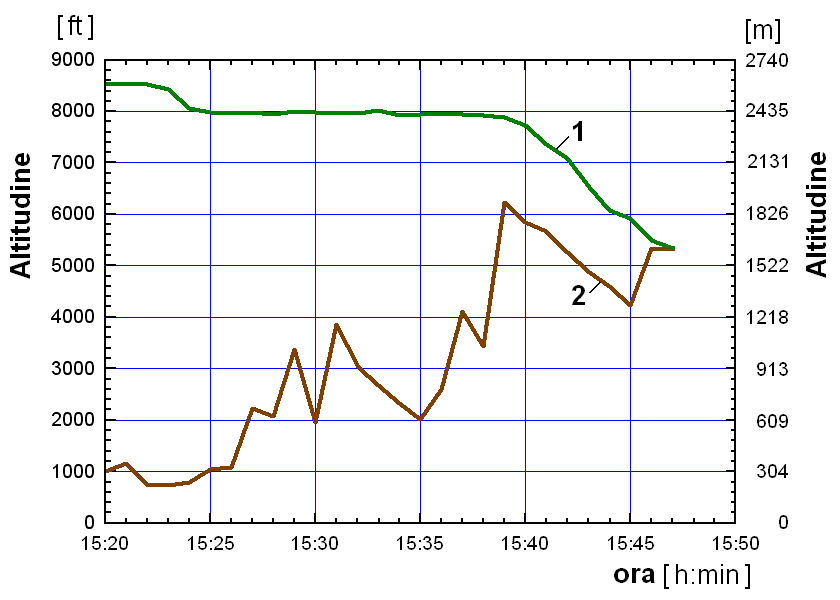
Flight profile extracted from the GPS system. 1) aircraft altitude 2) ground level

After crossing the mountains, the airplane dropped to FL 85 (2,590 m) and failed to reach FL 90, which indicated ice formation problems. In the Apuseni mountains zone, permitted level is FL 80 (2,435 m), thus Iovan decided to descend to that altitude. The flight became again an IFR flight, but not according to the initial flight plane. However, the FL 80 does not offer the condition to the resolution for the problem of the icing. At 15:39:53, the flight profile indicates an increase in the descent, and the commission of inquiry considered that this was the moment at which the engines shut down due to the ice. Therefore, the pilot did not have any other choice but to carry out a gliding flight until the forced landing, which occurred at an altitude of 1600 m in a wooded area, with consequent destruction of the airplane, the deaths of Iovan and Aurelia Ion, the serious injury of Drs Calu, Pivniceru and Ianceu and the slight injury of Dr Zamfir. With the exception of Zamfir, who had fastened his seat belt shortly before, none of the other pilots and passengers, had their seat belt fastened.

During the flight, there were periods in which the radio connection was lacking, one of the causes was that ROMITSA control centers requested to passing at higher frequencies of 136 MHz (experimental frequencies), to which the radio of the airplane (YR-BNP) could not access.

=== Search and rescue operations ===
To localize the accident, the plane was equipped with an ELT type localization radio beacon. This type of radio beacon is emitting signals on 121.5 MHz and 406.0xx MHz frequencies. The 406.0xx MHz frequencies can only be received by the satellites of the COSPAS - SARSAT Centre (Satellite Search and Rescue Centre), through Moscow control center, which did not respond during the day of 20 January.

In the preliminary report the CIAS confirmed that the ELT beacon with which it was equipped the airplane involved was an ACR Electronics ARTEX C406-2. This type of radio beacon broadcast on all three frequencies: 121.5 MHz, 243 MHz (at the time out of service) and 406.0xx MHz, using two different cables for the antennas for this. It was found that the LED of the radio beacon was flashing, which confirmed the beacon was in operation, but the connection cable of the 406 MHz antenna was broken at the base and was not found on the accident site, one situation confirmed in the final report that recognizes this aspect remains unexplained. In these circumstances, was explained the statement that the Moscow Control Center did not receive a signal from Romanian territory during the accident.

Initially, STS affirmed that the localization was made from the first call to 112 emergency service, but that localization was incorrect, hence an investigation was also opened on this aspect, which then determined if the fault belonged to STS or to mobile operators. The recommendations from Gabriel Oprea report revealed that at the moment of the accident, the localization procedure based on phone calls was applied only in cases required by the judicial system, not in case of an accident. On behalf of the Romanian Police, Petre Tobă stated that the GSM signal tracking device was mounted on a police van and weighed 300 kg, and to carry out the localization it had to be moved to the vicinity of a GSM terminal or the van will be found near Bucharest at the moment of the incident and could reach the Apuseni Mountains in only 6–8 hours. In the same statement, Tobă as presented the excuse for not using such device because of legal reasons, that is, the lack of a magistrate's mandate, the system being intended exclusively for the handling of criminal cases. Such statements contradict the fact that at European level the obligation exists to localize those that called 112 emergency service in case of plane accident. Also, even in this case, like in every airplane accident, a criminal investigation was opened, which would have justified the use of the system.

STS affirmed that, despite all efforts, GPS tracking of the phones at the accident site was not possible. In 2008 the European Commission had started a procedure of infringement against Romania, but this procedure was closed through diplomatic efforts only after the promise that the problem was resolved. Only in 2009 the implementation of the infrastructure began, only for Bucharest, spending over 10 million Romanian lei. As the accident revealed, the system was not working in all the country at the moment of the accident. In response to an open letter, Gary Machado, executive director of the European Emergency Number Association assigned blame for the situation on Neelie Kroes, who at the time of the incident had not enacted European-level regulation requiring provision of GPS coordinates in emergencies. The lack of provision of this critical information from the mobile company of the 112 caller to the emergency services was recognised as a major factor in the lethal delay in the rescue. The CIAS final report indicated the coordinates of the impact site as 46.331545°N 22.584953°E data provided by the GPS navigation system.

The Gabriel Oprea report affirmed that the 121.5 MHz frequency would be received by ROMATSA, but would not be utilized for locating the site. The equipment required for field location was a lightweight radio receiver, similar to that used for orienteering (see ELT). Annex 1 from the final report observed that in Romania the Search and Rescue service it was not specific to different situations, but was incorporated into the IGSU, which was designed for mass relief operations, which required the mobilization of large logistical resources, but in a slow manner. The SAR Command Center (CC-SAR) inside ROMATSA did not have its own logistic resources, could only appeal to IGSU, that, however, had no resources like helicopters equipped with 121.5 MHz receiving stations, with a reaction time of minutes. Regarding the alarm, the report highlighted that ROMATSA was responsible only if the alarm had arrived from Air traffic controllers, but it was done at 112, therefore the responsibility of ROMATSA has been limited to making the information in its possession available upon request.

=== Final report ===
On October 19, 2015, the Center for Investigation and Analysis for Civil Aviation Security (Romanian: Centrul de Investigații și Analiză pentru Siguranța Aviației Civile) (CIAS) published, as the authority responsible for investigating civil aviation incidents, the final accident report, and made it public during a press conference on October 19, 2015. During the press conference, Eugen Stanciu, member of the inquiry committee of CIAS, affirmed that the plane was piloted by Răzvan Petrescu, but the captain was Adrian Iovan, who had the decisional power. He also underlined that the purpose of CIAS investigations wasn't to consider those who had made mistakes accountable, but to establish the causes of the accidents and to recommend the necessary measures to avoid it in future.

"We don't care if someone made a mistake, because we weren't looking for the culprit. It's very important to us that the safety recommendations achieve their goal and prevent similar accidents in the future. But even in the operator's operating manual, it's very clearly specified who has the decision-making authority, including over that decision—namely, the crew commander — and that's normal. So there's no connection between who the crew commander is and who's piloting. The crew commander was Mr. Iovan."

According to the report, the principal cause of the incident was the engine shutdown due to severe icing of the carburetor. The contributing causes were the incorrect evaluation of the specific risk factors of this flight due to the long flight interruption and the inexperience of the crew on the Britten-Norman Islander, included in the multi-engine piston (MEP) class, as well as several bad decisions by the commander of the airplane continue the flight mission in weather conditions that favored severe icing of the carburetor, flying for an extended period of time in icing conditions, continue the mission in AMA, in IMC flight conditions according to visual flight rules (VFR), and take off with the mass exceeding the maximum permitted limit and with the position of the center of gravity outside the limits calculated and imposed by the manufacturer.

=== Recommendations ===
In accordance with its purpose, the final report made a number of recommendations:

- Specify how air traffic controllers will manage the situation in case of failure to comply with the flight plan;
- Tightening of requirements of flight interruption for the Multi Engine Piston class airplanes;
- Improving the interdepartmental communication in SAR activities;
- Informative procedure related to the introduction of new radio frequencies;
- Procedure to resume the flight in MEP class airplanes after an interruption of other 3 months;
- Defining the position of the main cockpit on Britten-Norman Islander planes;
- The obligation to check the knowledge of the norms for the report of incidents to the CIAS by civil aviation officials (the accident was not reported according to the rules);
- The obligation for economic operators in the field to ensure the formation of the staff in the matter of reporting of accidents and serious incidents in civil aviation;
- Specifying the tasks of every member of the flight crew during all flight phases (Iovan has omitted some briefings);
- Instruct air traffic controllers on the procedures to be followed in situations of flight rule changes to avoid ambiguity.

== Other reports ==
=== ROMATSA Report ===
In the ROMATSA Report:

- Declared that at 14:35 flight RFT111 requested at the NAPOC sector inside Bucharest Area Control Center (ACC) to descend at flight level 100 (10,000 feet) due to icing and was informed that the Area minimum altitudes in the area were at level 105 (10,500 feet).
- Declared that at 14:42 the flight declared to descend at level 80 (8,000 feet).
- Admitted that at 16:04 received the information that the plane as crashed, from the brigadier general Ioan Baș head of brigade of Crișana, following telephone conversations between Baș and air traffic controllers in the control tower of Oradea International Airport.
- Confirmed that the Emergency Locator Transmitter (ELT) was operative, but that not have received the position from the MCC via the COSPAS – SARSAT Center.
- Admitted to have asked confirmation of the incident to the brigade of Alba only at 16:30 (according to Oprea report after the intervention of Ministry of National Defence).
- Interrupted the "event film" at 15:49, when the Air traffic control (ATC) attempted to contact the aircraft following the disappearance from the radar screen.

=== Gabriel Oprea report ===
On January 22, 2014, Gabriel Oprea presented to the Government of Romania a report, the part of which was made public was a summary.

That summary gave the following results:

- Airplane was equipped with valid airworthiness documents.
- The responsibility of accepting the flight in meteorological conditions fell to the pilot.
- The alarm was sent to ROMATSA and STS. Raed Arafat transmitting the information to the general Ion Burlui, at IGSU, at 16:05 and STS was informed from the call of dr. Zamfir at 16:16. One by one, ISU Bihor (16:19), ISU Cluj (16:20), SJA Cluj (16:20), IPJ Cluj (16:20), IJJ Cluj (16:20), COAP/MApN (16:22 – 16:27), ROMATSA (16:28 – 16:33, by MApN), Arad Helicopter (16:32), Târgu Mureș Helicopter (16:34), Brașov Alpine Rescue (16:34), Alba 112 Center (16:42), which alerted the ISU, IJJ, IPJ and SJA Alba dispatch centers.
- The search began at 16:50. Though the rules would foresee that, if it was available coordinates, if it were necessary to go there directly, a field search was organised between 16:50 and 21:13, following the procedure applied in the absence of information.
- At 21:13, Gheoghe Trif, from the accident site, communicated the exact coordinates to STS. Only at that moment will be direct the search teams, that begin the evacuation of the injured at 22:05.

The report concludes that ROMATSA doesn't take the necessary proceedings to stabilize a search area for the airplane, doesn't started the search operations and doesn't requested the support from Air Operations Center of the Ministry of National Defense of Romania.

=== Statement by Octavian Pleter ===
Octavian Thor Pleter, Associate professor at Faculty of Aerospace Engineering of Bucharest, has evaluated that the accident was caused by Adrian Iovan. In case of icing the pilot would have had three options: climb above the atmospheric front with humidity (but the low power of the engines did not allow this maneuver), descending below the atmospheric front or return to Sibiu. The pilot would have opted for the second option, which he failed to do. According to mister Pleter, the pilot would have opted for the third option. At the same time, affirms that the wrong decision of the pilot would be exonerated ROMATSA from every responsibility.

=== CSAT analysis ===
On February 2, 2014, it was held an analysis Supreme Council of National Defence for discussing of incident and ask for resignation of general Marcel Opriș, head of the STS. In his statement after the meeting, Traian Băsescu affirmed the impression that the Romanian state was not able to act in situations of emergency was wrong. He also stated that the STS could not have done more in that moment, because could locate only landlines and, in the case of mobile phones, the only informations were that received for telephone operator, the cell, which in the area had a surface area of about 200 km. He also believed that the information spread in the press was lies.

However, recognized that the rescue operation was a failure, attributing to the fact that wasn't coordinated occording to the current regulations and that no commands have been established by either the Ministry of the Interior or the Ministry of Transport. From the other part, Ion Burlui, head of IGSU at the moment of the accident, declared in is onorary resignations that the ministers doesn't have operational powers. They are responsible only of the organization of the ministry they lead, but they interference in operational actions is not advantageous.

=== Report from the Ministry of Transport ===
The report presented by Ministry of Transport claimed that the first localization was carried out through "apps on the phone of one of the survivors", while the ISU Cluj received the coordinates from STS. 46.6023°N 22.98421°E , that were transmitted from ISU Alba. This coordinates indicated a place located at almost 5,5 km north of effective place of the impact, which has the coordinates 46.554383°N 22.980338°E. However, the colonel Adrian Fulea denied that these coordinates came from the STS.

Always in the report, Ramona Mănescu affirmed that the ministerial committee for emergency was not called up because have not been satisfied a series of conditions specified on a ministerial ordinance signed by Ovidiu Silaghi on 2012, but that ordinance contraddicts another governative decision that approved the regulament on the conduct of emergency situations generated from the occurrence of a civil aviation accident, a superior rule which established the obligations of the Ministry of Transport. The practical effect of the committee's failure to convene was poor communication between STS, ISU, and ROMATSA, which delayed the research.

== Aftermath ==
As a direct result of the crash of flight RFT111 and the response to it, the head of the national emergency response department, IGSU, resigned. One day later, also as a result, the Interior Minister Radu Stroe resigned. A passenger on board had died of hypothermia after surviving the crash because of the long emergency response. This has led to an overhaul of the country's emergency response methods.

The three rescuers arrived for first on the scene of the accident at 21.13, Argentin Todea, Gheorghe Giurgiu and Gheorghe Trif, residents in Horea (Petreasa and Dârlești villages), received the title of onorary citizen of Cluj county.

For their voluntary commitment, civic conscience and the solidarity demonstrated on rescue of the victims, Transylvania Off-Road Sports Club, SMURD Cluj and the team of doctors, assistants and paramedics of the Cluj County Emergency Clinical Hospital received diplomas of merit.

The Secretary of State, Constantin Chiper (PNL) of Ministry of Internal Affairs was fired. Prime minister Victor Ponta requested the replacement of the general director and the operating director of ROMATSA and the director of STS, Marcel Opriș. IGSU head, Ion Burlui, resigned, following the situation regarding the intervention of rescue teams at the scene of the accident.

General manager of ROMASTA, Aleodor Frâncu resigned but pleaded not guilty. Also Bogdan Donciu is resigned, chief operating officer of the company, that at the moment of the accident he was taking an exam at the Polytechnic University of Bucharest, where he was a professor, that regards also radar systems and air navigation. Minister Radu Stroe resigned.

Cătălin Predoiu (PDL) accused ministers of negligence in their duties, Radu Stroe because a crisis unit was not immediately organized at the Ministry of the Interior, Ramona Mănescu because didn't coordinated ROMATSA and Eugen Nicolăescu because didn't worry of how these transplant actions were performed.
