= Sala Unirii =

Historical building in Alba Iulia, Romania

Coordinates: 46°04′05″N 23°34′17″E

Sala Unirii in early 2009

The Sala Unirii (lit. 'Union Hall') is a historical building in the Alba Carolina Fortress of Alba Iulia, Romania. It is an iconic memorial to the Union of Transylvania with Romania on 1 December 1918.

== Overview ==
Register of participants in the Great National Assembly of 1 December 1918 kept at the Sala Unirii

The building now known as Sala Unirii was originally erected in 1898-1900 as a military "casino" or officers' club, serving as ceremonial hall for the military facilities of the Alba Iulia Citadel.

On 1 December 1918, as the most spacious secular room in the city, it was chosen as the venue for the Great National Assembly meeting that enacted the union of Transylvania with Romania.

The hall was refurbished in subsequent years as a permanent memorial to that day. In 1920, French painter Pierre Bellet was commissioned by a committee chaired by Prime Minister Alexandru Averescu, to create decoration evoking Romania's past on an iconographic program established by committee member Nicolae Iorga.

On 15 October 1922, the newly completed hall served as the venue for the banquet given on the occasion of the crowning of King Ferdinand I and Queen Marie. Other banquets held in the hall included those for the Union celebrations on 20 May 1929 and for the inauguration of the obelisk of Horea, Cloșca, and Crișan on 14 October 1937.

Bellet's oil-on-canvas paintings were removed and largely destroyed in 1948. In 1968, for the 50th anniversary of the union, the building was reopened as an exhibition hall, with new decoration in line with the Communist ideaology of the era. The new decoration was created by painters Constantin Piliuţă, Marius Cilievici and Pavel Codiţă.

The hall was again renovated for reopening on 1 December 2018 for the centenary celebrations. On that occasion, the original paintings by Bellet were restored or recreated by a team from the Brukenthal National Museum in Sibiu.

== Decoration ==
Northern archivolt in 2014, with 1960s decoration before the restoration of the 1922 paintings

In the main hall and the side rooms on both sides, key figures of Romanian history are depicted.

=== Above entrance door ===
- Trajan, Roman emperor 98-117
- Decebalus, Dacian king 87-106

=== Southern archivolt ===
- Radu Negru, legendary prince of Wallachia in the late 13th century
- Bogdan the Founder, first independent prince of Moldavia in the 1360s
- Basarab I, prince of Wallachia in the first half of the 14th century
- Alexander the Good, prince of Moldavia 1400-1432
- Vlad III the Impaler, prince of Wallachia 1448-1477 (with interruptions)
- Stephen III the Great, prince of Moldavia 1457-1504
- Radu IV the Great, prince of Wallachia 1495-1508
- Peter the Lame, prince of Moldavia 1574-1579
- Teodosie, princess of Wallachia in 1521
- Michael the Brave, prince of 1593-1601, of Transylvania 1599-1600, and of Moldavia in 1600
- Radu Șerban, prince of Wallachia 1602-1611
- Ieremia Movilă, prince of Moldavia 1595-1606 with interruption in 1600

=== Northern archivolt ===
- Matei Basarab, prince of Wallachia 1632-1654
- Vasile Lupu, prince of Moldavia 1634-1653
- Grigore I Ghica, prince of Wallachia 1660-1673 (with interruption)
- Șerban Cantacuzino, prince of Moldavia 1678-1688
- Dimitrie Cantemir, prince of Moldavia 1710-1711
- Constantin Brâncoveanu, prince of Wallachia 1688-1714
- Tudor Vladimirescu, leader of the Wallachian uprising of 1821
- Barbu Dimitrie Știrbei, prince of Wallachia 1848-1856 (with interruption)
- Gheorghe Bibescu, prince of Wallachia 1843-1848
- Mihail Sturdza, prince of Moldavia 1834-1849
- Alexandru Ioan Cuza, prince of Wallachia and of Moldavia 1859-1862, then domnitor of Romania 1862-1866
- Carol I, domnitor 1866-1881 then King of Romania 1881-1914

=== Northern side room ===
- Ion Oarga, known as Cloșca, co-leader of the revolt of Horea, Cloșca, and Crișan in 1784
- Vasile Ursu Nicola, known as Horea, leader of the revolt
- Marcu Giurgiu, known as Crișan, co-leader
Trajan & Decebalus

South archivolt

North archivolt

Northern side room

Southern side room

== See also ==
- National Museum of the Union
