= Moon Church =

Heritage site in Bihor County, Romania

- Biserica cu Lună
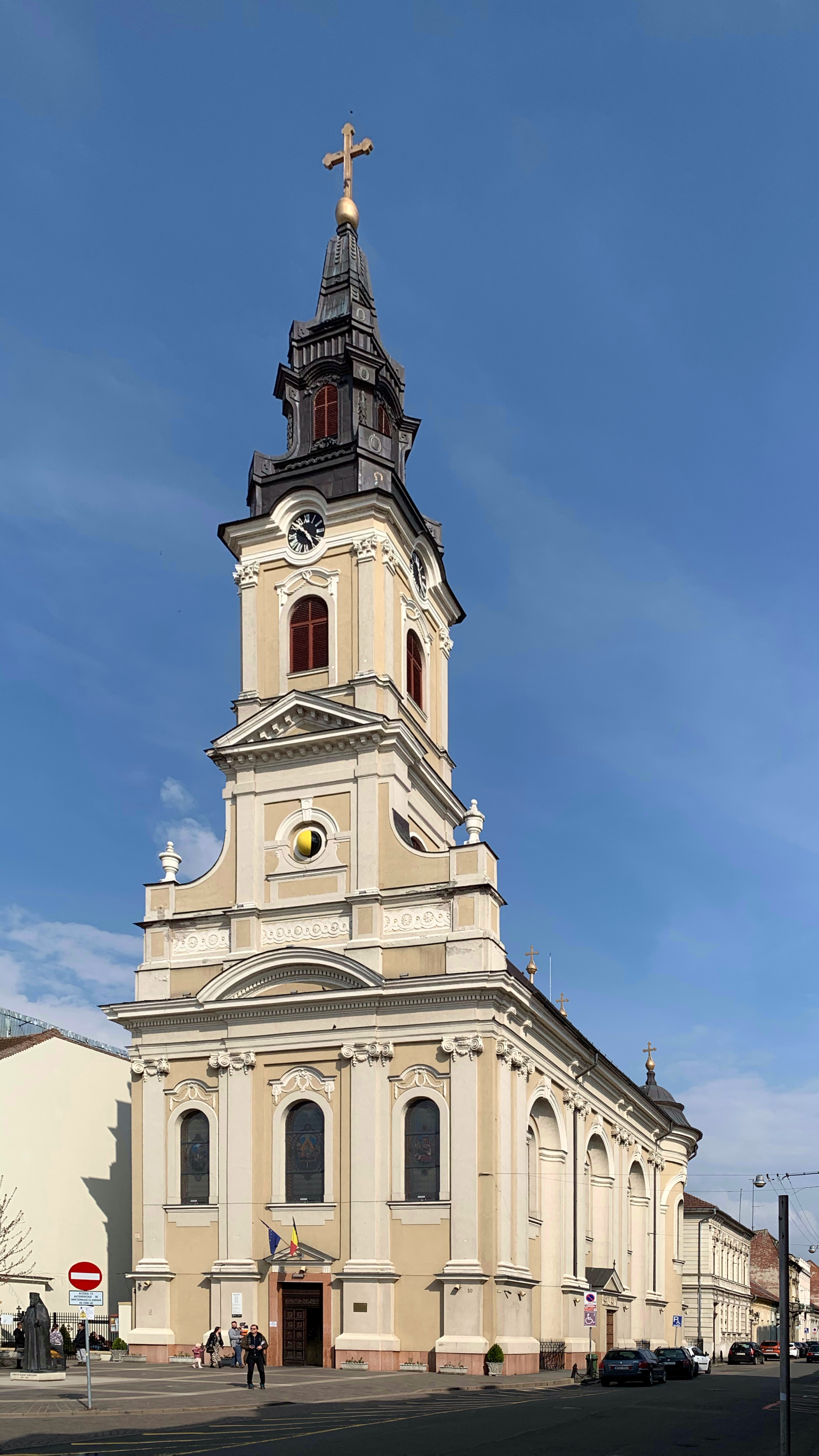
- Front facade of the church

Religion
- Affiliation: Romanian Orthodox Church
- Year consecrated: 1832

Location
- Location: Oradea
- Country: Romania
- Interactive map of Moon Church
- Coordinates: 47°03′13″N 21°55′44″E

Architecture
- Style: Baroque architecture
- Groundbreaking: 1784
- Completed: 1790

The Moon Church (Romanian: Biserica cu Lună) is a Romanian Orthodox church located at 10 Piața Unirii, Oradea, Romania. It is dedicated to the Dormition of the Mother of God.

== History ==
The local Orthodox community mainly lived in the Velența and Orașul Nou ('New Town') districts, and was composed of Romanians, Serbs, Aromanians and Greeks. A number of them acquired substantial wealth, were prominent in city life and wished to build a grand church. Two wealthy and influential judges on the appeals court, Püspöky Mihály and Kristoff Mihály - noblemen devoted to the Orthodox faith - obtained an audience with Joseph II. They argued that the city’s only Orthodox church, located in Velența, was too far from other Orthodox areas. In spite of protests, permission was granted.

Bishop of Arad, Petar Petrović, presided over the cornerstone laying. This is recorded in Greek, Romanian and Serbian inscriptions. Construction began in November 1784, during the Revolt of Horea, Cloșca and Crișan. Éder Jakab (Jakob Eder), a Nagyvárad (Oradea) local, was the architect, and Johann Lins the building engineer. In the summer of 1786, following several days of torrential rain, the structure partly collapsed. Work was completed in 1790, with the first services taking place in November. Once the interior painting was finished in 1832, the church was consecrated.

== Description ==
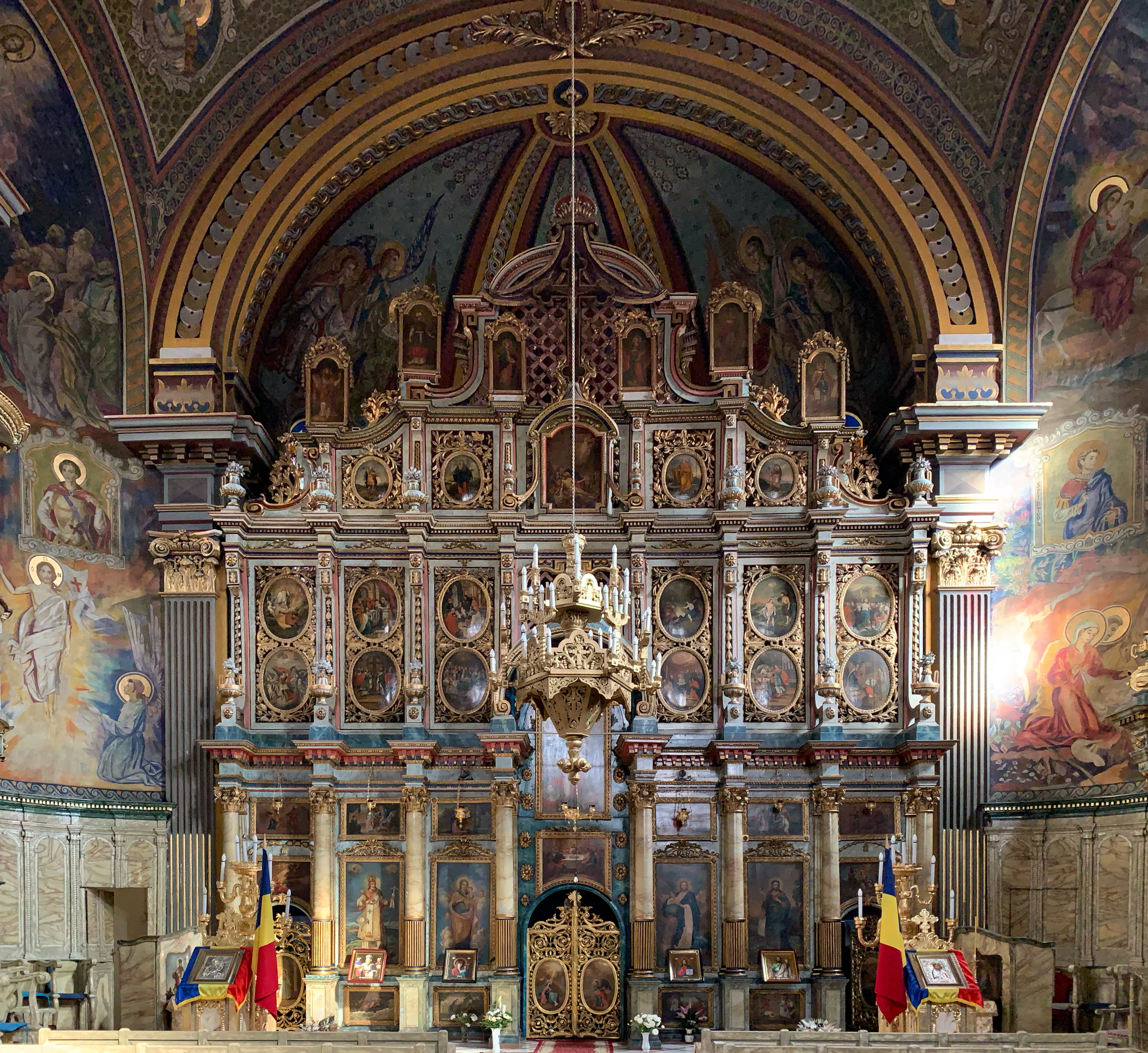
Iconostasis of the church

The style is late Baroque with clear classicizing elements, as well as a decided provincial stamp. The interior strictly adheres to the norms of Byzantine architecture. The keystone above the iconostasis used to feature a portrait of Vasile Ursu Nicola, better known as the revolt leader Horea and usually considered the only authentic depiction of his face. Today, a copy stands in its stead; the original is at the Oradea Diocese museum.

The nickname derives from a mechanism installed in the spire in 1793. The clock and moon are the work of an innovative Viennese hobby astronomer and clockmaker, Georg Rüppe. The mechanism that turns the moon is designed to complete a whole rotation around its axis every 28 days, thus indicating the phases of the moon, based on the daily cycle marked by the clock mechanism. The anchoring wheel of the clock is engraved in German with the designer’s name and hometown.

The church served as a cathedral from 1920, when the Oradea Diocese was revived, until 2012, when a new cathedral opened. The church was repainted in 1977-1979. It is listed as a historic monument by Romania's Ministry of Culture and Religious Affairs.

== See also ==
- Greeks in Romania
- Serbs of Romania
- Prague astronomical clock
- Sighișoara Clock Tower
