= Olar =

Olar, meaning "potter", is a Romanian surname and may refer to:

- Corina Olar, Romanian footballer
- Corneliu Olar, Romanian politician
- Florentina Spânu Olar, Romanian footballer
