= IJJ =

IJJ or ijj may refer to:

- ijj, ISO 639-3 code for the Ije variant of the Ede language
- Italian jiu-jitsu, martial art related to traditional Japanese Jujutsu
- IJJ, NYSE Arca code for iShares S&P MidCap 400 Value Index, an American exchange-traded fund
- IJJ Cluj, dispatch center responding to the Școala Superioară de Aviație Civilă Flight 111 crash
