= Rădești, Alba =

Rădești
- Commune
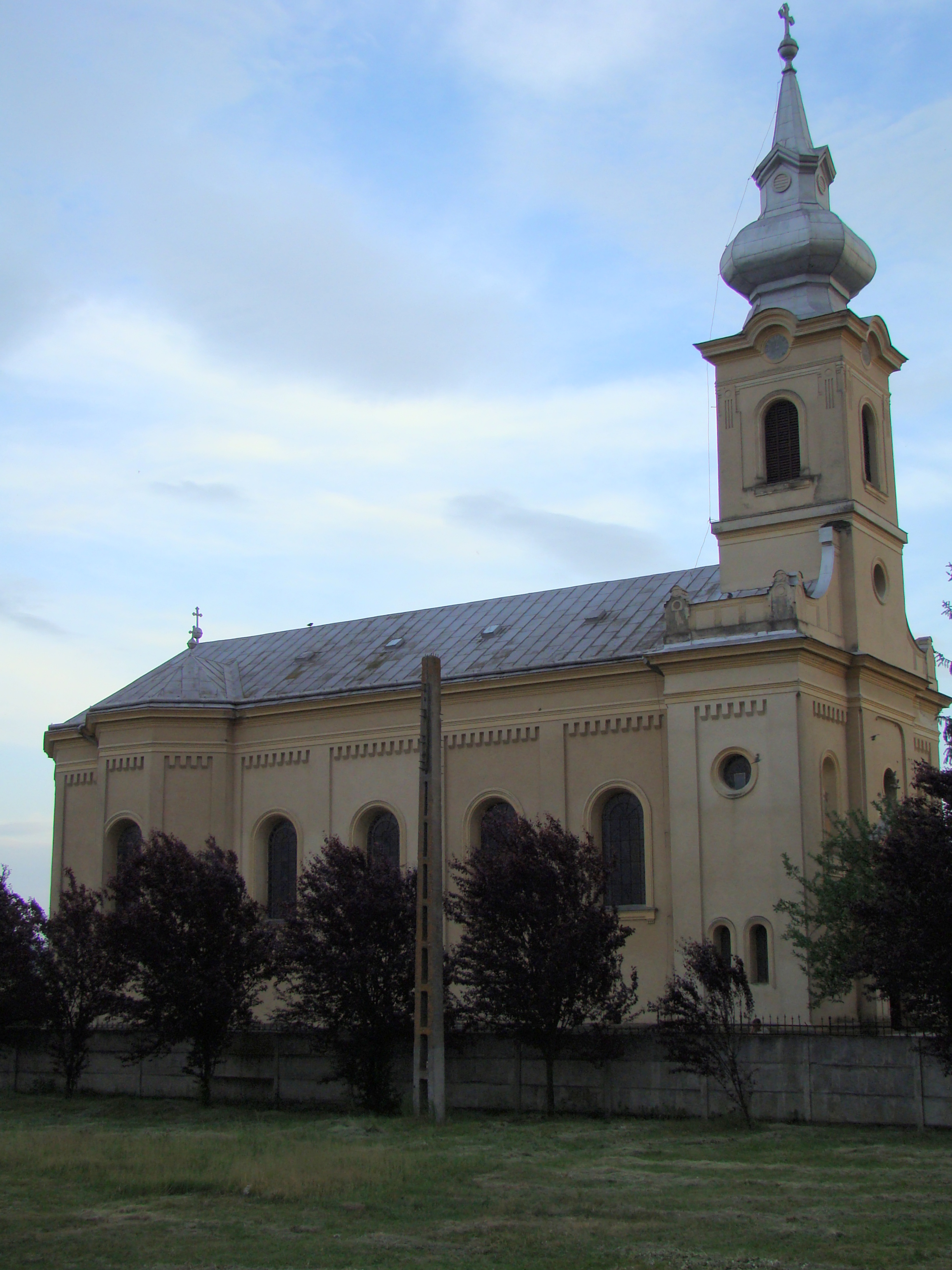
- Greek-Catholic church in Rădești

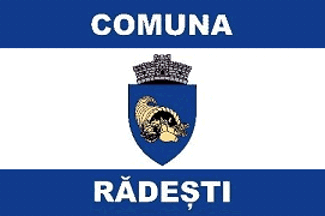
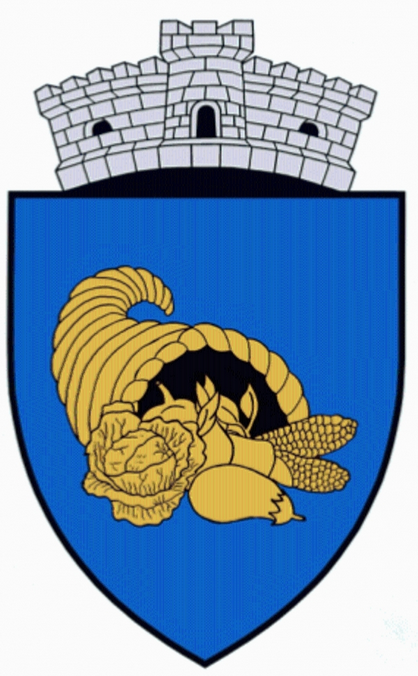
- Flag Coat of arms

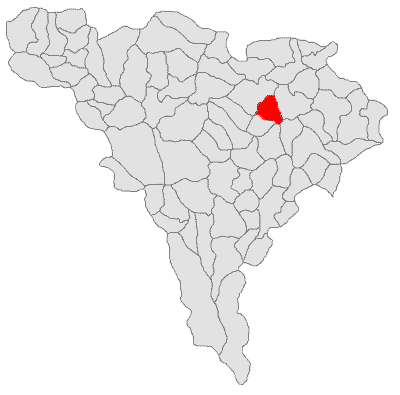
- Location in Alba County

- Location in Romania
- Coordinates: 46°16′N 23°43′E
- Country: Romania
- County: Alba

Government
  - Mayor (2020–2024): Alin-Teodor Nicula (PNL)
- Area: 29.76 km^{2} (11.49 sq mi)
- Elevation: 221 m (725 ft)
- Population (2021-12-01): 1,175
  - Density: 39.48/km^{2} (102.3/sq mi)
- Time zone: UTC+02:00 (EET)
  - Summer (DST): UTC+03:00 (EEST)
- Postal code: 517585
- Area code: (+40) 02 58
- Vehicle reg.: AB
- Website: www.primariaradesti.ro

Rădești (formerly Tâmpăhaza; German: Thomaskirch; Hungarian: Tompaháza) is a commune located in Alba County, Transylvania, Romania. It is composed of four villages: Leorinț (Laurentzi; Lőrincréve), Meșcreac (Weichseldorf; Meggykerék), Rădești, and Șoimuș (Magyarsolymos).

== Demographics ==
Historical population
Year	Pop.	±%
2002	1,398	—
2011	1,200	−14.2%
2021	1,175	−2.1%
Source: Census data

At the 2011 census, the commune had a population of 1,200, of which 78.1% were Romanians, 19.3% Hungarians, and 2.4% Roma. Furthermore, 63.7% were Romanian Orthodox, 21.4% Reformed and 14% Greek-Catholic. At the 2021 census, there were 1,175 inhabitants, of which 80.6% were Romanians and 14.55% Hungarians.

== Natives ==
- Augustin Lazăr (born 1956), academic and magistrate
- Demetriu Radu (1861 – 1920), Greek Catholic bishop
