= Obelisk of Horea, Cloșca, and Crișan =

Monument in Alba Iulia, Romania

- Obeliscul lui Horea, Cloșca și Crișan
- Interactive map of Obelisk of Horea, Cloșca, and Crișan
- Location: Alba Iulia, Alba County, Romania
- Coordinates: 46°04′02″N 23°34′35″E
- Designer: Iosif Fekete, Octavian Mihălțan
- Inauguration date: 14 October 1937

The Obelisk of Horea, Cloșca, and Crișan is a historical monument located in Alba Iulia, Alba County, Romania.

== Description ==
The Obelisk of Horea, Cloșca, and Crișan is located in Alba Iulia on Str. Mihai Viteazul ("Michael the Brave Street"), in front of the third gate of the Alba Carolina Citadel.

It commemorates the Revolt of 1784–1785 in the Apuseni Mountains, led by the peasants Horea (Vasile Ursu Nicola, 1731–1785), Cloșca (Ion Oarga, 1747–1785) and Crișan (Marcu Giurgiu, 1733–1785), in protest of the poor living and working conditions of feudal serfs in the Principality of Transylvania. The revolt was crushed by Emperor Joseph II, with Horea and Cloșca executed by Hungarian authorities on the breaking wheel in Alba Iulia (then called Gyulafehérvár), and Crișan hanging himself before the execution.

The northwest side of the monument faces the Citadel gate and features a tableau of Horea, Cloșca, and Crișan. They are flanked by onlookers and greenery that forms a shape reminiscent of the border of Greater Romania. The southeast side of the monument faces the lower town of Alba Iulia and depicts the winged goddess Victoria, holding a wreath in her right hand. At the base of the monument is a jail cell with wrought iron doors, symbolizing the repression of the revolt. The obelisk is approximately 20 metres (66 feet) tall. It is an example of Art Deco architecture and design. As of 2023, the obelisk is tilting; this could be due to the fact that its foundation is made of oak trunks, which may be rotting after almost 90 years.

== History ==
The monument was designed by Iosif Fekete, an ethnic Hungarian sculptor from Hunedoara, Romania who had previously designed the Monument to the Heroes of the Air in Bucharest. The architectural elements were designed by Octavian Mihălțan.

The monument was inaugurated on 14 October 1937 in the presence of King Carol II and Mihai, Voivode of Alba Iulia (later King Michael I). with some 70,000 people in attendance.

The monument is registered on the List of Historical Monuments in Alba County under the LMI Code AB-III-m-B-00401.

== Gallery ==
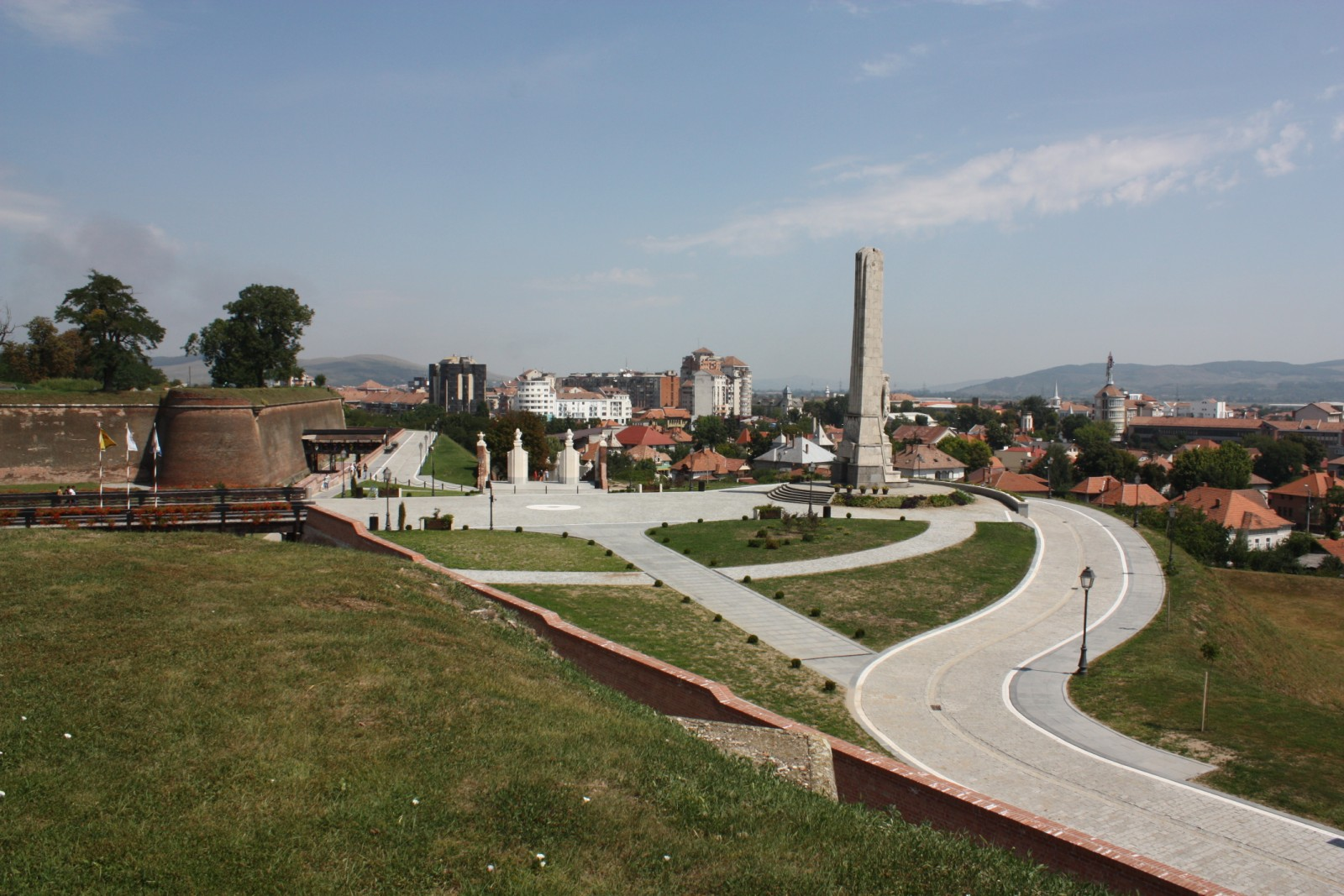
The monument as seen from the Citadel
