= Horea, Alba =

Horea
- Commune
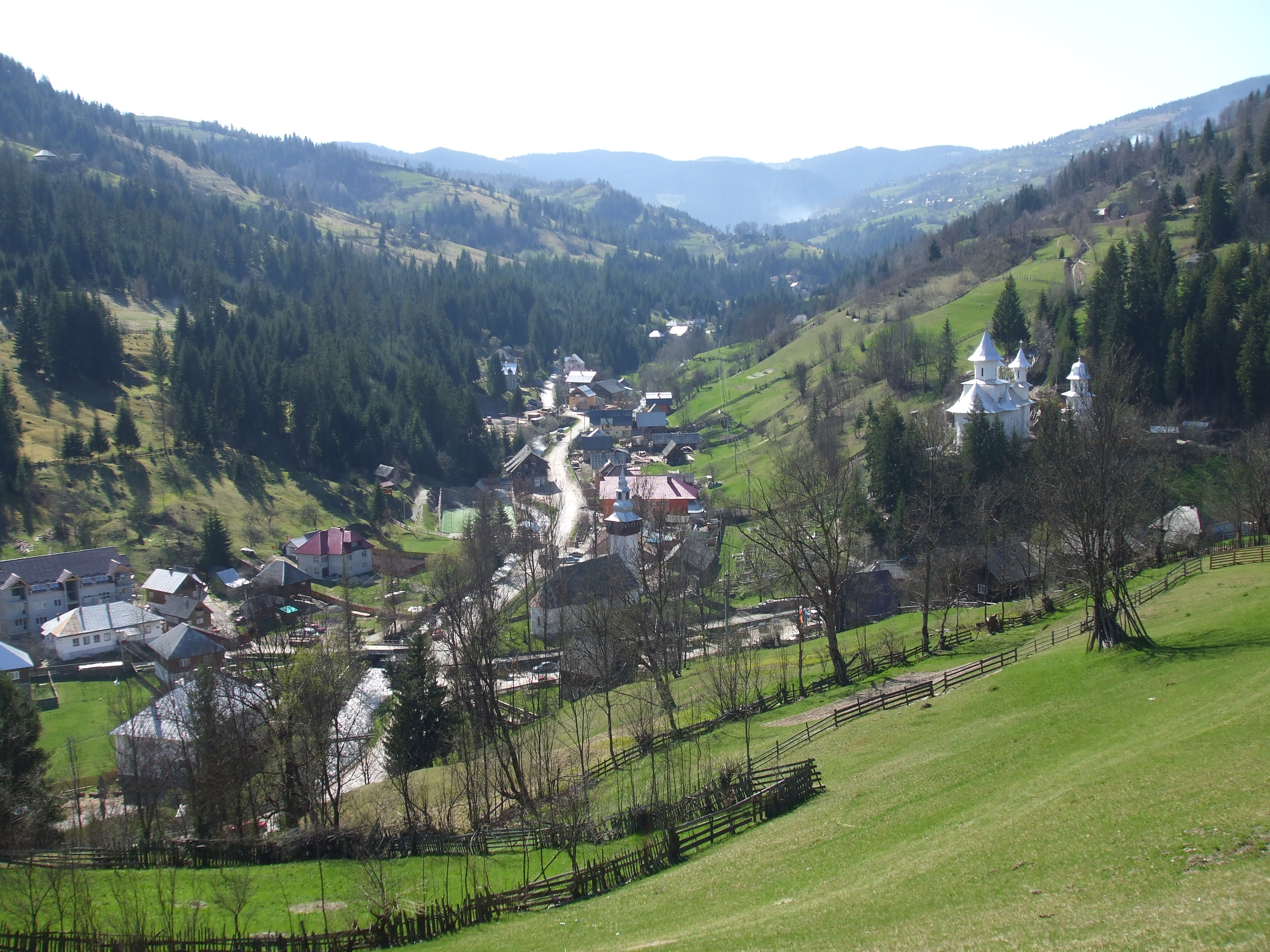
- View of Horea

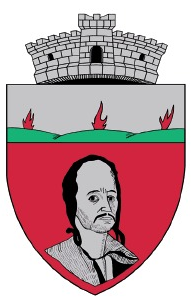
- Coat of arms

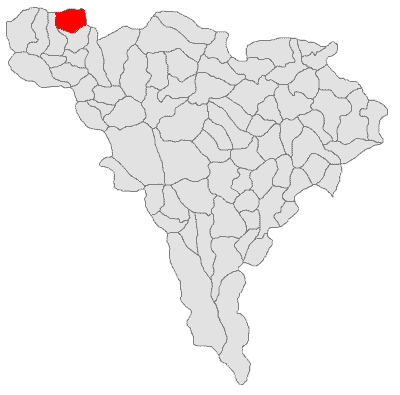
- Location in Alba County

- Location in Romania
- Coordinates: 46°27′N 22°58′E
- Country: Romania
- County: Alba

Government
  - Mayor (2020–2024): Marin Nicola (PNL)
- Area: 60.41 km^{2} (23.32 sq mi)
- Elevation: 711 m (2,333 ft)
- Population (2021-12-01): 1,774
  - Density: 29.37/km^{2} (76.06/sq mi)
- Time zone: UTC+02:00 (EET)
  - Summer (DST): UTC+03:00 (EEST)
- Postal code: 517340
- Area code: (+40) 02 58
- Vehicle reg.: AB
- Website: comunahorea.ro

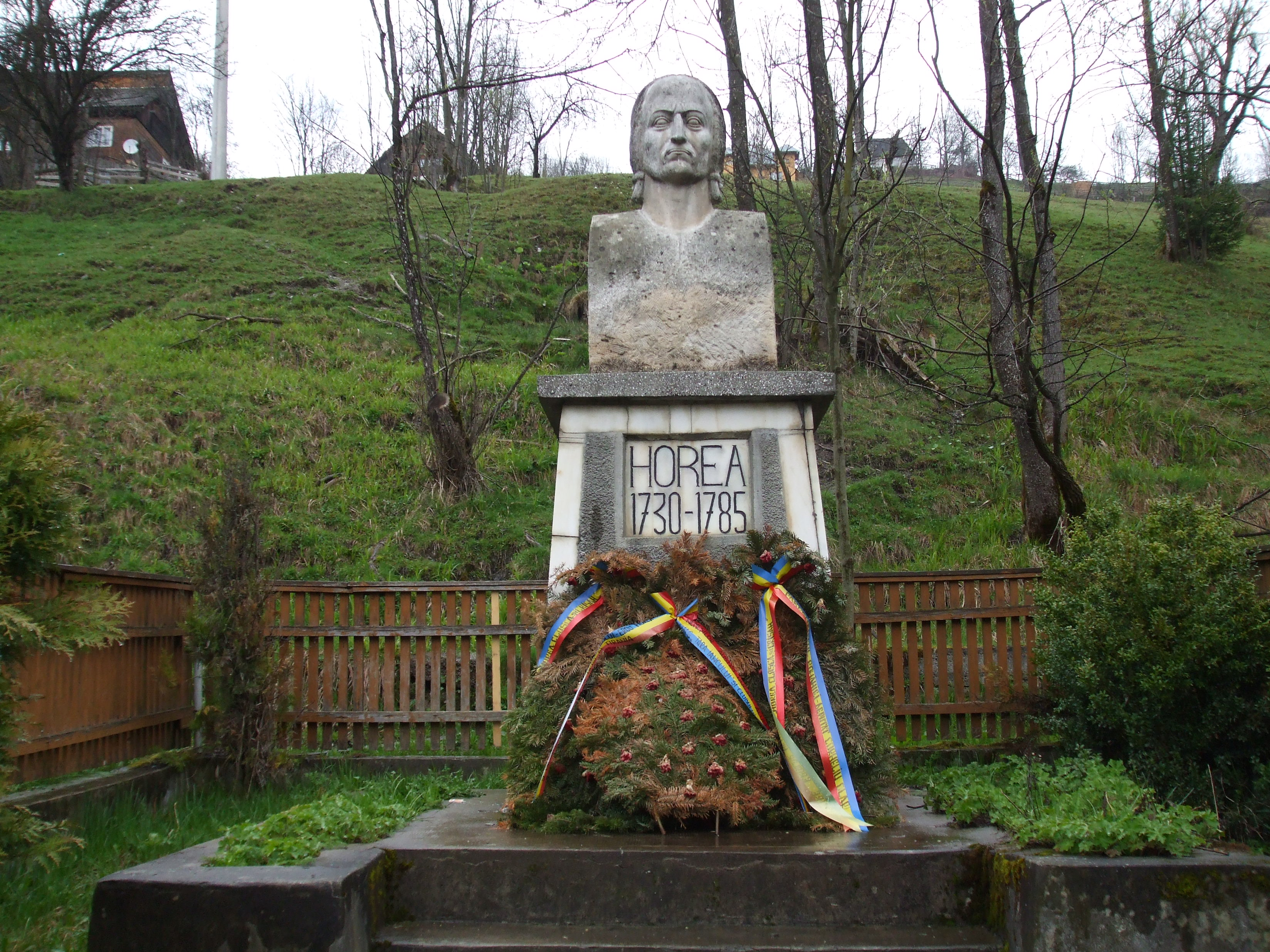
Bust of Horea in the commune that bears his name

Horea (formerly Arada; German: Arroden; Hungarian: Arada) is a commune located in Alba County, Transylvania, Romania. It has a population of 1,774 as of 2021, and is made up of fifteen villages: Baba, Butești, Dârlești, Fericet, Giurgiuț, Horea, Măncești, Mătișești, Niculești, Pătrușești, Petreasa, Preluca, Teiu, Trifești, and Zânzești.

The commune is named after Vasile Ursu Nicola, commonly known as Horea, who was born in 1731 in the village of Arada (now Horea), on Fericet Hill, and who led in 1784 the two-month-long peasant rebellion known as the Revolt of Horea, Cloșca and Crișan.

Horea commune belongs to the Țara Moților ethnogeographical region. It is nestled within the Apuseni Mountains, between the Bihor Mountains to the west and Muntele Mare to the east. Part of the Apuseni Natural Park lies on the administrative territory of the commune.

Horea is situated in the northwestern corner of Alba County, on the border with Cluj County, 26 km (16 mi) from the town of Câmpeni and 102 km (63 mi) from the county seat, Alba Iulia. It is crossed by national road DN1R, which joins Albac, 7.3 km (4.5 mi) to the south, to the town of Huedin, 73 km (45 mi) to the north.

In 2014, Școala Superioară de Aviație Civilă Flight 111 crashed in deep snow, on a hillside 3.6 km (2.2 mi) northeast of the village of Petreasa, at an altitude of approximately 1,400 m (4,600 ft).

== Natives ==
- Corneliu Olar (1959–2022), politician
