= Mission control centre (Cospas-Sarsat) =

Within the International Cospas-Sarsat Programme, Mission control centres (MCCs) are responsible for receiving and distributing distress signal alerts from emergency position-indicating radiobeacon stations. MCCs are a core component of the international satellite based search and rescue system.

The functions of an MCC are:

- to collect, store and sort the data from local user terminals (LUTs) and other MCCs;
- to provide international and national data exchange within the Cospas-Sarsat system; and
- to distribute alert and location data to associated rescue coordination centres (RCCs) or SAR points of contact (SPOCs)

As of September 2024, there are 34 MCCs active or in development around the world.

== List of Mission Control Centres ==
Code	Name
AEMCC	United Arab Emirates
ALMCC	Algiers, Algeria
ARMCC	El Palomar, Argentina
ASMCC	Cape Town, South Africa
AUMCC	Canberra, Australia
BRMCC	Brasilia, Brazil
CHMCC	Santiago, Chile
CMC	Moscow, Russia
CMCC	Trenton, Canada
CNMCC	Beijing, P. R. of China
CYMCC	Larnaca, Cyprus
FMCC	Toulouse, France
GRMCC	Athens, Greece
HKMCC	Hong Kong, China
IDMCC	Jakarta, Indonesia
INMCC	Bangalore, India
ITMCC	Bari, Italy
JAMCC	Tokyo, Japan
KOMCC	Incheon, Rep. of Korea
MYMCC	Malaysia (under development)
NIMCC	Abuja, Nigeria*
NMCC	Bodoe, Norway
PAMCC	Karachi, Pakistan
PEMCC	Callao, Peru
QAMCC	Doha, Qatar
SAMCC	Jeddah, Saudi Arabia
SIMCC	Singapore, Singapore
SPMCC	Maspalomas, Spain
TAMCC	Taipei, ITDC
TGMCC	Lomé, Togo (under development)
THMCC	Bangkok, Thailand
TRMCC	Ankara, Turkey
UKMCC	Fareham, UK
USMCC	Suitland, USA
VNMCC	Haiphong, Vietnam

*This MCC is not operational. NIMCC currently configured as a SPOC of the SPMCC

== See also ==
- Cospas-Sarsat
