= Corneliu Olar =

Romanian politician

Member of the Chamber of Deputies
- In office 2016–2022
- Succeeded by: Ion-Alin-Dan Ignat
- In office 2008–2012

Personal details
- Born: 18 April 1959 Horea, Alba, Romania
- Died: 15 February 2022 (aged 62)
- Party: National Liberal Party

Corneliu Olar (18 April 1959 – 15 February 2022) was a Romanian politician who is member of the Chamber of Deputies from 2008 to 2012, and from 2016 to his death in 2022.

== Biography ==
He was born in Horea, Alba County. A member of the National Liberal Party, he served from 2008 to 2012, and later was elected in 2016 and 2020. He died in 2022, and was succeeded by Ion-Alin-Dan Ignat.
