= Serviciul de Telecomunicații Speciale =

Romanian intelligence agency

Special Telecommunications Service
- Serviciul de Telecomunicaţii Speciale
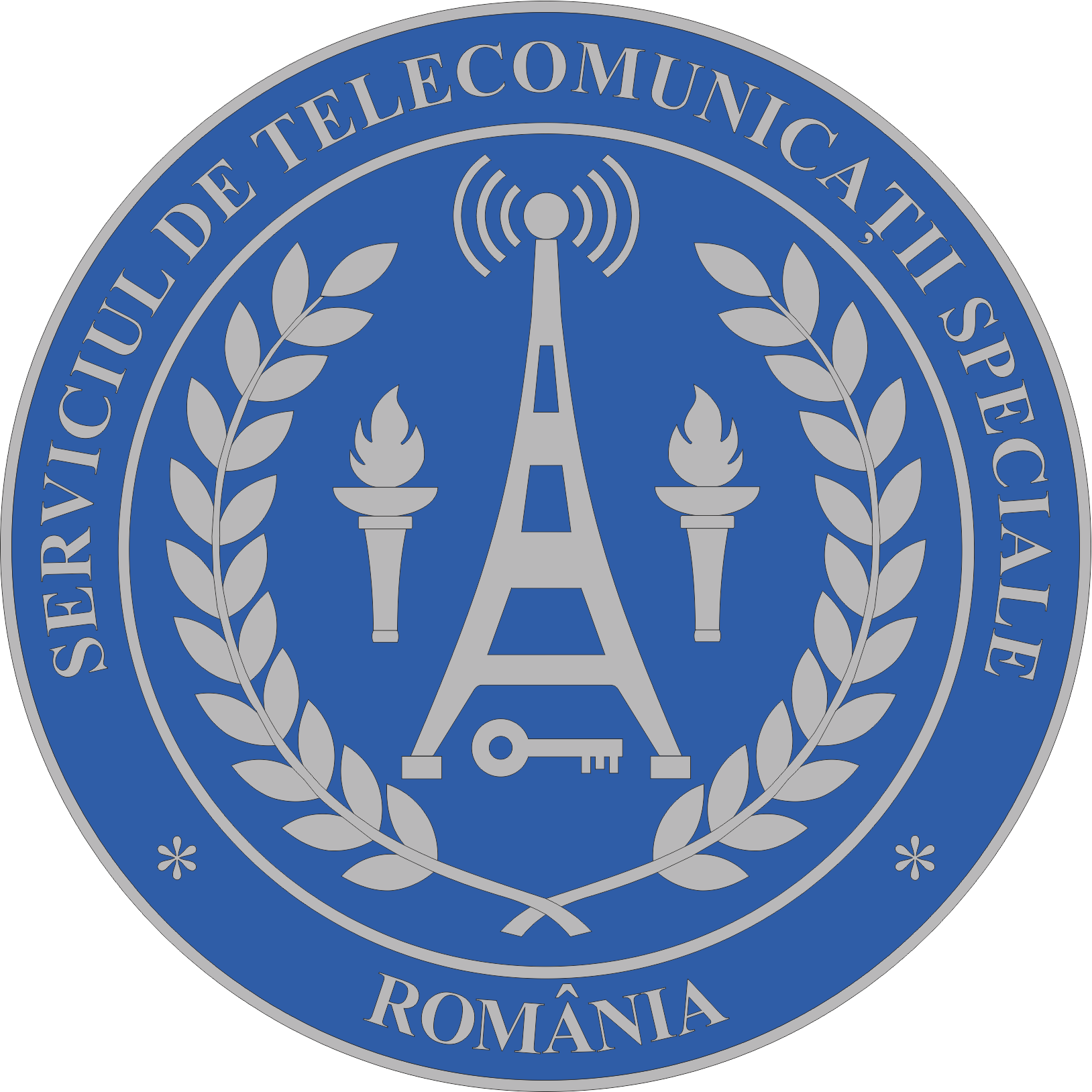

Agency overview
- Formed: 18 December 1992
- Employees: Classified
- Annual budget: EUR 132 million (2020)
- Agency executive: General Ionel-Sorin Bălan, Director
- Website: www.sts.ro

Special Telecommunications Service (Serviciul de Telecomunicații Speciale in Romanian, abbreviated STS) is the Romanian institution that coordinates the activities in the field of special secure communications. STS is an agency with military status.

== Activity ==
The service provides special communication facilities to all of the institutions accredited by law (such as the Presidency, Government and other bodies of national interest). STS is in charge of "transmissions, emissions or receptions of signs, signals, writings, images, sounds or information of any kind, transmitted through wire, radio, optic system or other electromagnetic systems".

STS is also in charge of the Single National Emergency Call System (abbreviated SNECS), which operates the emergency telephone number, 112. SNECS, including its infrastructure, falls under the direct command of STS.

== Projects of public interest ==
In June 2011, STS announced that it would establish a nationwide intranet network. This network is designed to ensure secure and reliable communications between different state institutions. The project will be financed by the Romanian Government, but the costs are unknown. The network will be free-of-charge, and all the important state ministries and agencies will be given a free connection to the network.

== History ==
STS was created on 18 December 1992. The agency's original purpose was to provide communication between the executive and the legislative of Romania, but it has since expanded to other bodies of national interest.

In 2003, the Single National Emergency Call System project was started. In July 2005, the emergency telephone number (112) became operational, under the supervision and lead of STS.
