= Augustin Lazăr =

Romanian university professor

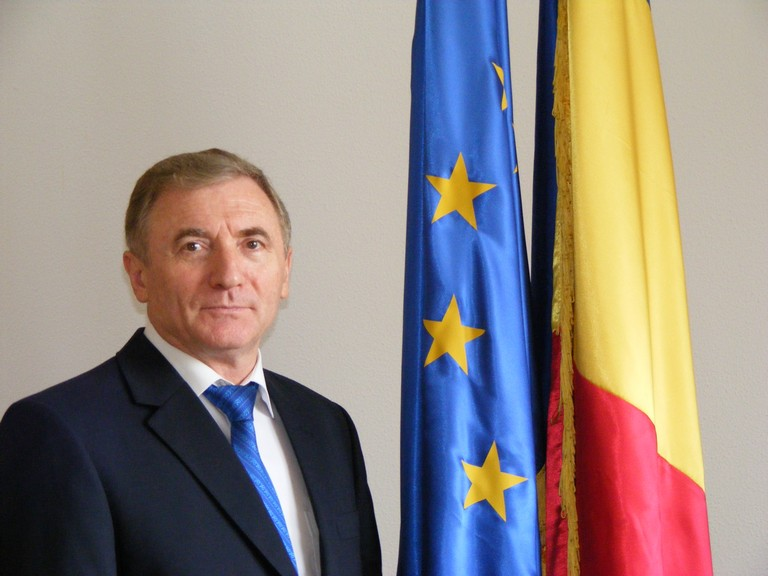

Prosecutor General of Romania
- In office 28 April 2016 – 27 April 2019
- President: Klaus Iohannis
- Preceded by: Tiberiu Nițu

Personal details
- Born: 25 October 1956 (age 69) Rădești, Alba County, Romania
- Education: Babeș-Bolyai University

Augustin Lazăr (born 25 October, 1956, Rădesti, Alba County, Romania) is a university professor and author of legal publications, career magistrate. Lazăr served as the Prosecutor General of the Prosecutor's Office attached to the High Court of Cassation and Justice of Romania from April 28, 2016, until 27 April, 2019.

== Education ==
In 1981, Augustin Lazăr graduated from the Faculty of Law of Babeș-Bolyai University of Cluj-Napoca and then he attended educational courses in the EU and in the United States. In 2003, he obtained a Doctor of Law degree from the same university in the field of investigation of business related offenses.

== Professional activity ==
After graduation, he served as a lawyer of the Bar in Alba County (1981 – February 1982). From 1 March 1982 until December 1997, he successively occupied the following positions: trainee prosecutor, prosecutor at Alba Iulia Prosecutor's Office and the Prosecutor's Office attached to Alba Iulia Tribunal. During the interval January 1998 and August 1998, he served as a Chief Prosecutor at the Prosecutor's Office attached to the Alba Iulia Court of Appeal. In September 1998, he was appointed Chief Prosecutor of the Anticorruption, Criminal Investigation and Forensic Section of the Prosecutor's Office attached to the High Court of Cassation and Justice, and he kept this capacity until 28 February 2001. From 1 March 2001 and 31 December 2012, Augustin Lazăr served as Deputy Prosecutor General of the Prosecutor's Office attached to the Alba Iulia Court of Appeal, and from 1 January 2013 until 27 April 2016, he was General Prosecutor of the same Prosecutor's Office. From 28 April 2016 until 27 April 2019, Lazăr served as the Prosecutor General of the Prosecutor's Office attached to the High Court of Cassation and Justice.

== Selected works ==
- Ancheta antifraudă în mediul afacerilor, Lumina Lex, 2004. ISBN 9789737581426
- Corpus Juris Patrimonii (with Aurel Condruz), Lumina Lex, 2005
- Combaterea criminalității c/a patrimoniului arheologic european, Lumina Lex, Bucharest, 2008, (co-author)
- Combaterea criminalității c/a patrimoniului cultural european, Mega, 2009 (co-author)
- Combaterea traficului cu bunuri culturale (with Sorin Alămoreanu, Corina Borş, Iuliana Lucreţia Roşian, Petru Ionescu), Universul Juridic, Bucharest, 2013. ISBN 9789731278964
- Toward a Prosecutor for the European Union (co-author of the chapter on the Romanian system), Hart/Beck, Oxford, 2012. ISBN 9781782250449
- "Illicit Trafficking in Cultural Goods in South East Europe: Fiat Lux!" in Countering Illicit Traffic in Cultural Goods, The Global Challenge of Protecting the World Heritage, ICOM, Paris, 2015. ISBN 978-92-9012-415-3
- Ministerul Public – istorie și perspective (with Ovidiu Predescu and Mircea Dutu), Universul Juridic, Bucharest, 2017. ISBN 9786063900112
- Conflictul de interese. Teorie si jurisprudenta. Studii de drept comparat, Universul Juridic, Bucharest, 2016. ISBN 978-606-673-925-2
- Procurorul European – retrospectiva cercetării științifice premergătoare propunerilor Comisiei Europene, Revista Pro Lege, no. 4/2016.

== Academia ==
Since 1993, Augustin Lazăr is a lecturer and associate professor at "1st December 1918" University of Alba Iulia. Since 2009, he is also a professor of criminal sciences at the same institution.

== Professional associations ==
Augustin Lazăr is a member of the Romanian Society of Criminology and Criminalistics, a member of the International Association of Prosecutors, and a member of the Association "Amici dell'Accademia di Romania" in Rome.

== Honors and awards ==
- The National Order "Faithful Service" in the rank of Officer, Decree no. 528 / 1 December 2000 of the President of Romania
- United States Department of Justice Appreciation, for the activity in the Overseas Prosecutorial Development, Assistance and Training Program, 2001
- "Judicial merit" diploma awarded by Decree no. 23/28 June 2002 of the President of Romania
- Certificate of Award, Who is Who World Society Corp., Encyclopedia of Personalities in Romania, December 6, 2011
- Honorary Member of European Lawyers Union, Luxembourg, 2016

== Personal life ==
Lazăr is married with two children.
