= International Cospas-Sarsat Programme =

International satellite-aided search and rescue initiative

Coordinates: 41°08′04″N 16°50′04″E

- Established: 1 July 1988; 38 years ago (date definitive agreement was signed; preceding memoranda of understanding signed 23 November 1979 and 5 October 1984)
- Type: Intergovernmental organization
- Legal status: Active
- Headquarters: Montreal, Quebec, Canada
- Members: 45 formally associated "participant" states and agencies: Algeria**; Argentina**; Australia**; Brazil**; Canada*; Chile**; China***; Cyprus**; Denmark; Finland; France*; Germany; Greece**; India***; Indonesia**; Italy**; Japan**; Korea**; Malaysia**; Netherlands; New Zealand**; Nigeria; Norway**; Pakistan**; Peru**; Poland; Qatar**; Russia*; Saudi Arabia**; Serbia; Singapore**; South Africa**; Spain**; Sweden; Switzerland; Thailand**; Togo**; Tunisia; Turkey**; United Arab Emirates**; United Kingdom**; United States*; Vietnam**; Hong Kong, China, Marine Department**; International Telecommunication Development Company (Taiwan)**; *Party state, and space- and ground-segment provider; **Ground-segment provider; ***Space- and ground-segment provider Additionally, although not state participants, the European Union, through its Galileo programme, is a space- and ground-segment provider, and EUMETSAT is a space-segment provider
- Official languages: English; French; Russian
- Head: Shefali Juneja (Head of secretariat)
- Council chair (rotating): Andrey Kuropyatnikov (Russian Federation)
- Website: www.cospas-sarsat.int; www.406.org

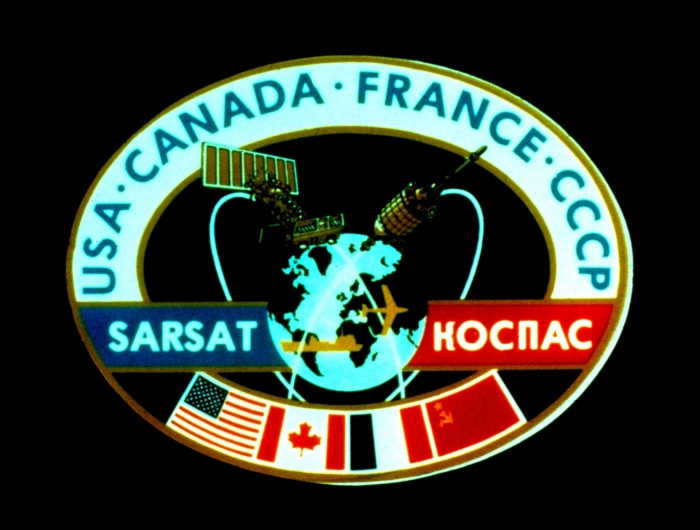
Logo as used until 1992

The International Cospas-Sarsat Programme is a satellite-aided search and rescue (SAR) initiative. It is organized as a treaty-based, nonprofit, intergovernmental, humanitarian cooperative of 45 nations and agencies (see infobox). It is dedicated to detecting and locating emergency locator radio beacons activated by persons, aircraft or vessels in distress, and forwarding this alert information to authorities that can take action for rescue. Member countries support the distribution of distress alerts using a constellation of around 65 satellites orbiting the Earth which carry transponders and signal processors capable of locating an emergency beacon anywhere on Earth transmitting on the Cospas-Sarsat frequency of 406 MHz.

Distress alerts are detected, located and forwarded to over 200 countries and territories at no cost to beacon owners or the receiving government agencies. Cospas-Sarsat was conceived and initiated by Canada, France, the United States, and the Soviet Union in 1979. The first rescue using the technology of Cospas-Sarsat occurred on 10 September 1982; 44 years ago. The definitive agreement of the organization was signed by those four states as the "parties" to the agreement on 1 July 1988.

The term Cospas-Sarsat derives from COSPAS (КОСПАС), an acronym from the transliterated Russian "Космическая Система Поиска Аварийных Судов" (Latin script: "Cosmicheskaya Sistema Poiska Avariynyh Sudov"), meaning "Space-based System for Locating Vessels in Distress", and SARSAT, an acronym for "Search and Rescue Satellite-Aided Tracking".

== Background ==
Cospas-Sarsat is best known as the system that detects and locates emergency beacons activated by aircraft, ships and people engaged in recreational activities in remote areas, and then sends these distress alerts to search-and-rescue (SAR) authorities. Distress beacons capable of being detected by the Cospas-Sarsat System (currently 406-MHz beacons) are available from several manufacturers and vendor chains. Cospas-Sarsat does not make or sell beacons.

Between September 1982 and December 2023 the Cospas-Sarsat System provided assistance in rescuing at least 63,745 people in 19,883 SAR events. In 2023 Cospas-Sarsat on average assisted in the rescue of almost nine persons each day. In 2021, 2022 and 2023 (the latest years for which statistics have been compiled), Cospas-Sarsat assistance included the following:

Cospas-Sarsat assistance events by year
Year	People rescued	SAR events	Aviation	Land	Maritime
2023	3,109	1,076	20%	44%	36%
2022	3,223	1,144	20%	39%	41%
2021	3,623	1,149	18%	45%	37%

These statistics under-count the number of events where Cospas-Sarsat assisted, because they only include cases when an accurate report from SAR personnel is provided back through reporting channels to the Cospas-Sarsat Secretariat.

Cospas-Sarsat does not undertake search-and-rescue operations. This is the responsibility of national administrations that have accepted responsibility for SAR in various geographic regions of the world (typically the same geographic area as their flight information region). Cospas-Sarsat provides alert data to those authorities.

Cospas-Sarsat cooperates with United Nations-affiliated agencies, such as the International Civil Aviation Organization (ICAO), the International Maritime Organization (IMO), and the International Telecommunication Union (ITU), among other international organizations, to ensure the compatibility of the Cospas-Sarsat distress alerting services with the needs, the standards and the applicable recommendations of the global community. Cospas-Sarsat is an element of the IMO's Global Maritime Distress Safety System (GMDSS), and is a component of ICAO's Global Aeronautical Distress and Safety System (GADSS). The IMO requires automatic-activating Cospas-Sarsat beacons (EPIRBs, see below) on all vessels subject to requirements of the International Convention for the Safety of Life at Sea (so-called SOLAS-class vessels), commercial fishing vessels, and all passenger ships in international waters. Similarly, ICAO requires Cospas-Sarsat beacons aboard aircraft on international flights, as well as the ability to track such aircraft when in distress (see "Beacons" under "System architecture" below). National administrations often impose requirements in addition to the international requirements of those agencies.

Cospas-Sarsat only monitors for alerts from digital distress beacons that transmit on 406 MHz (so-called 406 beacons). Older beacons that transmit using the legacy analog signal on 121.5 MHz or 243 MHz rely on being received only by nearby aircraft or rescue personnel. For satellite reception of alerts by Cospas-Sarsat the beacon must be a model that transmits at 406 MHz.

Cospas-Sarsat has received many honors for its humanitarian work, including induction into the Space Foundation's Space Technology Hall of Fame for space technologies improving the quality of life for all humanity.

== System operation ==
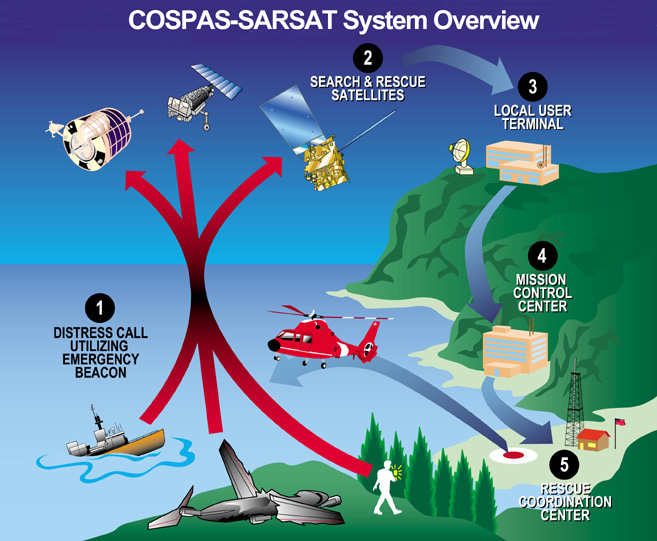
The components and operation of the Cospas-Sarsat system

The system consists of a ground segment and a space segment that include:

- Distress radio-beacons to be activated in a life-threatening emergency
- SAR signal repeaters (SARR) and SAR signal processors (SARP) aboard satellites
- Satellite downlink receiving and signal processing ground stations called LUTs (local user terminals)
- Mission control centres (MCCs) that distribute to rescue coordination centres distress alert data (particularly beacon location data) generated by the LUTs
- Rescue coordination centres (RCCs) that facilitate coordination of the SAR agency and personnel response to a distress situation.

=== Beacons ===
A Cospas-Sarsat distress beacon is a digital 406-MHz radio transmitter that can be activated in a life-threatening emergency to summon assistance from government authorities. Beacons are manufactured and sold by dozens of vendors. They are classified in three main types. A beacon designed for use aboard an aircraft is known as an emergency locator transmitter (ELT). One designed for use aboard a marine vessel is called an emergency position-indicating radio beacon (EPIRB). And one that is designed to be carried by an individual is known as a personal locator beacon (PLB). Sometimes PLBs are carried aboard aircraft or vessels, but whether this satisfies safety requirements depends on local regulations. A Cospas-Sarsat beacon does not transmit until it is activated in an emergency (or when certain testing features are activated by the user). Some beacons are designed to be manually activated by a person pressing a button, and some others are designed for automatic activation in certain circumstances (e.g., ELTs may be automatically activated by a physical shock, such as in a crash, and EPIRBs may be automatically activated by contact with water). There are no subscription or other costs imposed by Cospas-Sarsat for beacon ownership or use. (Some countries may impose licensing and/or registration charges for beacon ownership, and some jurisdictions may assess costs for rescue operations.) See below for recent beacon innovations.

=== Space segment ===
The Cospas-Sarsat system operational space segment consists of SARR and/or SARP instruments aboard:

- Three satellites in polar low-altitude Earth orbit with LEOSAR (low-altitude Earth orbit search-and-rescue) payloads,
- 13 satellites in geostationary Earth orbit with GEOSAR (geostationary Earth orbit search-and-rescue) payloads (two other, highly-elliptical-orbit, satellites are in preparation for use),
- 49 satellites in medium-altitude Earth orbit with MEOSAR (medium-altitude Earth orbit search-and-rescue) payloads (six others available for ground-segment testing and five others in preparation for use).

A SARR or SARP instrument is a secondary payload and associated antennas attached to those satellites as an adjunct to the primary satellite mission. A SARR instrument retransmits a beacon distress signal to a satellite ground station in real time. A SARP instrument records the data from the distress signal so that the information can later be gathered by a ground station when the satellite passes overhead.

=== Ground segment ===
The satellites are monitored by receiving ground stations (LUTs) equipped to track (point at and follow) the satellites using satellite dishes or phased antenna arrays. LUTs are installed by individual national administrations or agencies. The distress messages received by a LUT are transferred to an associated mission control centre which uses a detailed set of computer algorithms to route the messages to rescue coordination centres worldwide.

== System architecture ==
When a distress beacon is activated, the Cospas-Sarsat system:

- decodes the binary coded message of the beacon, which contains information such as the identity of the vessel/aircraft and, for beacons equipped with the feature, the location of the beacon derived from a local navigation source (such as a GPS receiver incorporated into the beacon's design), and
- performs a mathematical analysis of the signal to calculate the location of the beacon, even if the beacon's location is not reported in the distress message.

The Cospas-Sarsat system is the only satellite distress alerting system that is capable of this dual, redundant means of locating an activated distress beacon.

The SARR and/or SARP instrument typically is attached to a satellite that is being launched primarily for another purpose. The primary mission of all of the LEOSAR and GEOSAR satellites is meteorological (gathering of weather data). The primary mission of all of the MEOSAR satellites is navigation.

=== LEOSAR ===
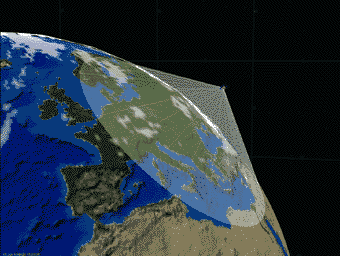
Example of LEOSAR signal footprint

LEOSAR was the original Cospas-Sarsat space segment architecture. The complementary LEOSAR-satellite orbits provide periodic coverage of the entire Earth. Because of their relatively low altitude (and therefore, relatively small "footprint" of visibility of any particular part of the Earth at any given time), there are intervals of time when a LEOSAR satellite may not be over a particular geographic location. So there can be a delay in receiving an alert signal, and a delay in relaying that signal to the ground. For this reason, LEOSAR satellites are equipped with the "store-and-forward" SARP modules in addition to "real-time" SARR modules. The satellite can pass over a remote area of the Earth and receive a distress message, and then forward that data later when it passes into view of a ground station (that typically are located in less remote areas). The three satellites in the LEOSAR constellation have approximately 100 minute orbits. Because of their polar orbits the latency between satellite passes overhead is smallest at the poles and higher at the equator. Reliance on the LEOSAR system is gradually being reduced in favor of the GEOSAR and MEOSAR systems described below.

The Cospas-Sarsat LEOSAR system was made possible by Doppler processing. LUTs detecting distress signals relayed by LEOSAR satellites perform mathematical calculations based on the Doppler-induced frequency shift received by the satellites as they pass over a beacon transmitting at a fixed frequency. From the mathematical calculations, it is possible to determine both bearing and range with respect to the satellite. The range and bearing are measured from the rate of change of the received frequency, which varies both according to the path of the satellite in space and the rotation of the Earth. This allows a computer algorithm to trilaterate the position of the beacon. A faster change in the received frequency indicates that the beacon is closer to the satellite's ground track. When the beacon is moving toward or away from the satellite track due to the Earth's rotation, the Doppler shift induced by that motion also can be used in the calculation.

=== GEOSAR ===
Because their geostationary orbit does not provide a relative motion between a distress beacon and a GEOSAR satellite, there is no opportunity to use the Doppler effect to calculate the location of a beacon. Therefore, the GEOSAR satellites only can relay a beacon's distress message. If the beacon is a model with a feature to report its location (e.g., from an on-board GPS receiver) then that location is relayed to SAR authorities. While the inability to independently locate a beacon is a drawback of GEOSAR satellites, those satellites have an advantage in that the present constellation well covers the entire Earth in real time, except for the polar regions.

=== MEOSAR ===
The most recent space segment augmentation for Cospas-Sarsat is MEOSAR. MEOSAR blends the advantages of the LEOSAR and GEOSAR systems, while avoiding their drawbacks. The MEOSAR system is becoming the dominant capability of Cospas-Sarsat. In addition to the large number of satellites, the MEOSAR system benefits from relatively large satellite footprints and sufficient satellite motion relative to a point on the ground to allow the use of Doppler measurements as part of the method of calculating a distress beacon's location. MEOSAR consists of SARR transponders aboard the following navigation-satellite constellations: the European Union's Galileo, Russia's Glonass, and the United States' Global Positioning System (GPS). In November 2022, China became the newest MEOSAR space-segment provider, with Cospas-Sarsat SAR payloads aboard six of its BeiDou (BDS) navigation spacecraft. The first SAR-equipped BDS spacecraft was launched on 19 September 2018, and the last on 23 November 2019.

Operational distribution of MEOSAR alert data began at 1300 UTC on 13 December 2016. Following continued testing and adjustment, a declaration of initial operational capability (IOC) was made by the Cospas-Sarsat Council effective from 25 April 2023. The MEOSAR system advances the ability to provide near-instantaneous detection, identification, and location-determination of 406-MHz beacons. Prior to the operational introduction of MEOSAR, MEOSAR data was successfully used to assist in determining the crash location of EgyptAir flight 804 in the Mediterranean Sea. The location of a distress beacon is calculated by the receiving LUT by analyzing the frequency-difference-of-arrival (related to Doppler-induced variations), and/or the time-difference-of-arrival of a beacon's radio signal due to the differences in distance between the beacon and each MEOSAR satellite that may be in view.

With respect to GPS-hosted payloads, experimental S-band payloads aboard 18 GPS Block IIR and GPS Block IIF satellites, and four payloads aboard GPS Block IIIA satellites are used operationally by the Cospas-Sarsat System. GPS Block IIIF satellites are planned to have dedicated, operational L-band SAR payloads provided by Canada, with launches beginning around 2026. The GPS SAR system is known as the Distress Alerting Satellite System (DASS) by NASA.

Additionally, the Galileo component of the MEOSAR system is able to download information back to the distress radio-beacon by encoding "Return Link Service" messages into the Galileo navigation data stream. It can be used to activate an indicator on the beacon to confirm receipt of the distress message.

=== Ground segment ===
As of December 2022 the LEOSAR satellites are tracked and monitored by 55 commissioned LEOLUT (low-altitude Earth-orbit local user terminals) antennas, the GEOSAR satellites by 27 commissioned GEOLUT antennas and the MEOSAR satellites by 26 commissioned MEOLUT stations, each having multiple antennas. The data from these earth stations is transferred to and distributed by 32 MCCs established globally, 14 of which are commissioned to process data from all three constellation types. (See infobox for the countries and agencies that are ground-segment providers.)

=== Beacons ===
==== Current beacon technologies ====
Most Cospas-Sarsat-compatible 406-MHz beacons also transmit distress or tracking signals on additional frequencies. Most commonly, Cospas-Sarsat beacons have a 121.5-MHz transmitter to provide a signal that can be received by local search crews (airborne, on ground or at sea) using direction-finding equipment. Additionally, the latest EPIRBs include an automatic identification system (AIS) transmitter in the marine VHF band that allows the beacon to be easily tracked from nearby vessels. Recent PLB models designed for attachment to marine life vests transmit an AIS signal to act as a maritime survivor locating system, also known as a man overboard (MOB) system, that activates alarms on nearby vessels and allows the beacon to be tracked by properly equipped vessels.

Beacons with such combinations of signals simultaneously allow for global alerting through the 406-MHz transmission to satellites and the swiftest local response from the 121.5-MHz and AIS transmissions (particularly in the maritime environment by nearby vessels).

In response to recent commercial aviation disasters and subsequent ICAO requirements for autonomous tracking of aircraft in distress, Cospas-Sarsat established specifications for ELTs for distress tracking (ELT(DT)s) to meet the ICAO requirements (amended Annex 6, Part I of the Convention on International Civil Aviation). Whereas conventional ELTs are designed to activate on impact or by manual activation by the flight crew, ELT(DT)s activate autonomously when an aircraft enters threatening flight configurations that have been predetermined by expert agencies. In this way, ELT(DT)s allow a plane in distress to be tracked in-flight, prior to any crash, without human intervention aboard the aircraft. ELT(DT)s have been specified using both the existing beacon transmission method (narrowband BPSK) and the second-generation (spread-spectrum QPSK) modulation schemes (see transmission technologies below). Cospas-Sarsat capability for receiving and processing distress messages from ELT(DT)s using the narrowband BPSK transmission method was declared operational effective 1 January 2023. In October 2023 capability for receiving and processing distress messages from ELT(DT)s using the spread-spectrum QPSK modulation method was declared with an effective date of 1 January 2024.

==== Beacon transmission technologies ====
There has been one transmission modulation method used by Cospas-Sarsat 406-MHz digital beacons since their inception more than 30 years ago, binary phase-shift keying (BPSK), with two allowed bit-string lengths: 112 (with 87 bits of message information) and 144 (with 119 bits of message information). Several message protocols are allowed in the available message-bit string to accommodate different kinds of beacons (ELTs, EPIRBs and PLBs), different vessel/aircraft identifiers, and different national requirements. The time length of these transmissions is approximately one-half second. These narrowband transmissions occupy approximately 3 kHz of bandwidth in a channelized scheme across the assigned 406.0 to 406.1 MHz band.

Cospas-Sarsat has recently specified a new, additional beacon modulation and message scheme based on spread spectrum technology with quadrature phase-shift keying (QPSK). Presently beacons that use this scheme are termed "second generation" beacons. It allows the use of battery-saving lower-power transmissions, improves the accuracy of the determination of the beacon location by the Cospas-Sarsat System, and avoids the need for discrete channelization in the assigned 406.0 to 406.1 MHz band (e.g., avoiding the need for periodic closing and opening of channels by Cospas-Sarsat for use by beacon manufacturers based on narrowband channel loading). Second-generation beacons have a longer transmission period of one second, with 250 transmitted bits, 202 of those being message bits. Additionally, the information sent in the message bits from one transmission to the next can be changed on a rotating transmission schedule ("rotating message fields") to allow significantly more information to be communicated over the course of a series of transmission bursts. Deployment of this technology in ELT(DT)s was to begin in January 2024. Cospas-Sarsat readiness for deployment of the technology in other types of beacons was expected later in 2024.

== History ==
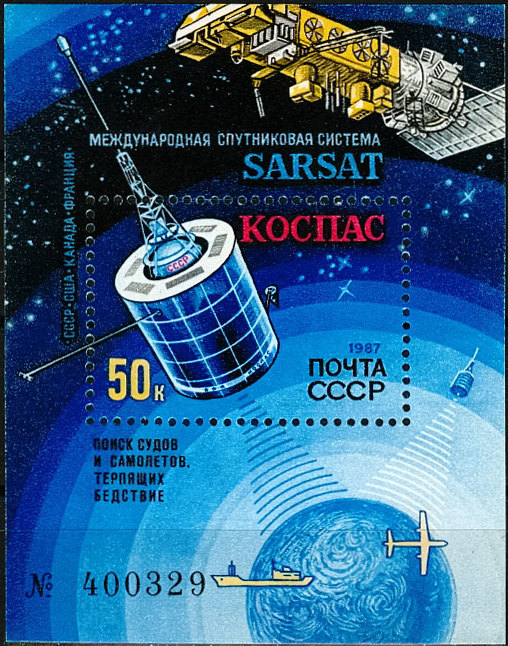
COSPAS-SARSAT international satellite system, search for ships and aircraft in distress. Stamp of USSR, 1987

=== Conception and demonstration ===
In the early 1970s, the Space System Group at Communications Research Centre Canada (CRC) began investigating whether an ELT could be detected and located from space. They realized that this could be accomplished through the Doppler shift of an ELT signal received by an orbiting satellite. CRC contacted AMSAT and was granted use of an OSCAR amateur radio satellite, through which they located an ELT modified to the satellite's uplink frequency. NASA contacted CRC over its success and the United States later agreed to a joint project.

=== First legal framework ===
On 23 November 1979, a "memorandum of understanding concerning cooperation in a joint experimental satellite-aided search and rescue project" was signed in Leningrad, USSR, among the US National Aeronautics and Space Administration, the USSR Ministry of Merchant Marine, the Centre National d'Etudes Spatiales of France, and the Department of Communications of Canada. Under Article 3 of the memorandum, it was stated that:

"Cooperation will be achieved through effecting interoperability between the SARSAT project and the COSPAS project at 121.5MHz, 243MHz and in the 406.0 – 406.1 MHz band and conducting of tests, mutual exchange of test results and preparation of a joint report. The objective of this cooperation is to demonstrate that equipment carried on low-altitude, near polar-orbiting satellites can facilitate the detection and location of distress signals by relaying information from aircraft and ships in distress to ground stations, where the information processing is completed and passed to rescue services."

"This joint Project will permit the Parties to make recommendations on follow-on global applications."

=== Development ===
The first system satellite, "COSPAS-1" (Kosmos 1383), was launched from Plesetsk Cosmodrome on 29 June 1982. Cospas-Sarsat began tracking the two original types of distress beacons, EPIRBs and ELTs, in September 1982. While the satellite's operation was being verified on September 9, COSPAS-1 detected an ELT signal in British Columbia and relayed the information to a then-experimental ground station at Defence Research Establishment Ottawa (DREO). The Canadians calculated the position of the small aircraft, which was 90 km (56 mi) off course, and within hours the crash survivors were rescued via airlift. These were the first persons rescued with the assistance of Cospas-Sarsat, and authorities judged that pilot Jonathan Ziegelheim would likely have died of his injuries if not for the swift rescue made possible by satellite detection.

Prior to the founding of Cospas-Sarsat, the civilian aviation community had already been using the 121.5 MHz frequency for distress, while the military aviation community utilized 243.0 MHz as the primary distress frequency with the 121.5 MHz frequency as an alternate. In each case, detection of the distress signal relied on reception by aircraft passing nearby, and localization of the signal was done with Earth-based direction finding equipment. Satellites made it possible to expand this "local" search paradigm into a global capability.

Each of the four founding party states took responsibility for one of the major tasks in the project. The United States (with project leadership from NASA's Goddard Space Flight Center in Greenbelt, Maryland) directed Datron Systems in Chatsworth, California, to design and build LUT ground stations to receive the downlink from the satellites. At Datron, a team designed a LUT with a five horn monopulse antenna for tracking the fast moving satellite across the sky. Jeffrey Pawlan designed the downconverter and the highly specialized receiver capable of locking onto the downlink from the satellites. Jeffrey Pawlan started with a Microdyne receiver and highly modified it with additional circuitry he designed that was capable of finding the suppressed carrier and staying locked onto it while receiving all three subcarriers. He accomplished this with a quadricorrelator discriminator that included three switchable phaselocked loops of different bandwidths. France and Canada were responsible for the data generation and decoding. They designed the computer that determined the approximate position of the beacon from the Doppler shift of the beacon's signal caused by the relative motion of the beacon and the receiving satellite. The former Soviet Union was responsible for the design and construction of the first satellite to be launched. Engineers from all four countries met in Moscow in February 1982 to successfully test the operational functionality of all of the equipment together in the same laboratory.

The party states led development of the 406-MHz marine EPIRB, which used a digital messaging scheme for detection by the system. The EPIRB was seen as a key advancement in SAR technology in the perilous maritime environment. The digital message allowed the beacon and its associated vessel to be uniquely identified. Early in its history, the Cospas-Sarsat system was engineered to detect beacon-alerts transmitted at 406 MHz, 121.5 MHz and 243.0 MHz. Because of a large number of false alerts, and the inability to uniquely identify such beacons because of their old, analogue technology (that provided no message, only a tone indicating distress), the Cospas-Sarsat system beginning in 2009 stopped receiving alerts from beacons operating at 121.5 MHz and 243.0 MHz, and now receives and processes alerts only from modern, digital 406-MHz beacons.

In the early 2000s (in 2003 in the US) a new type of distress beacon, the personal locator beacon (PLB), became available for use by individuals who cannot contact emergency services through normal telephone-originated services, such as 1-1-2 or 9-1-1. Typically PLBs are used by people engaged in recreational activities in remote areas, and by small-aircraft pilots and mariners as an adjunct to (or, when permitted, a substitute for) an ELT or EPIRB.

The design of distress beacons as a whole has evolved significantly since 1982. The newest 406-MHz beacons often incorporate global navigation satellite system (GNSS) receivers (such as those using GPS). Such beacons determine their location using the internal GNSS receiver (or a connection to an external navigation source) and transmit in their distress message highly accurate position reports. This provides a second method for Cospas-Sarsat to know the location of the distress, in addition to the calculations independently done by Cospas-Sarsat LUTs to determine the location. The distress alert received by the satellites and the beacon location contained in the message and/or calculated from the distress signal are forwarded almost instantly to SAR agencies by Cospas-Sarsat's extensive international data-distribution network. This two-tiered reliability and global coverage of the system has inspired the current motto of SAR agencies: "Taking the 'Search' out of Search and Rescue."

== See also ==
- Mission control centre (Cospas-Sarsat)
