= Revolt of Horea, Cloșca, and Crișan =

1784 peasant revolt in Transylvania

- Date: 31 October – 14 December, 1784
- Location: Metaliferi Mountains to Apuseni Mountains, Transylvania
- Methods: Serf revolt
- Result: Habsburg victory

Parties
Habsburg Monarchy	Romanian rebels

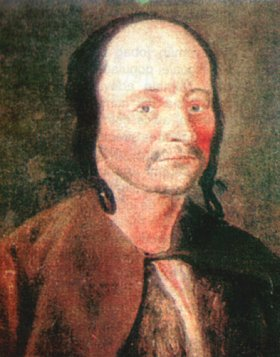
Horea

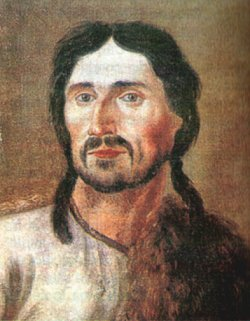
Cloșca

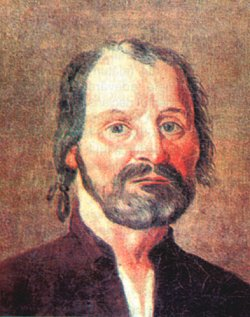
Crișan

The revolt of Horea, Cloșca, and Crișan (Romanian: Răscoala lui Horea, Cloșca și Crișan; 31 October – 14 December, 1784) was a Romanian-led revolt that began in the Metaliferi Mountains, Transylvania, but it soon spread throughout all Transylvania and the Apuseni Mountains. The leaders were Horea (Vasile Ursu Nicola, 1731–1785), Cloșca (Ion Oarga, 1747–1785) and Crișan (Marcu Giurgiu, 1733–1785).

== Background ==
The revolt was directly related to the poor conditions of feudal serfs in the Principality of Transylvania, where Orthodox Romanians lacked political equality with Catholics.

After Holy Roman Emperor Leopold I's incorporation of the principality into the Habsburg domains in 1691, the rights of the Hungarian, Székely, and Saxon nobles were preserved. The peasants, however, still had no representation in politics. In particular, though they were tolerated, the Romanian peasantry lacked guarantees for their Orthodox church institutions.

== The revolt ==
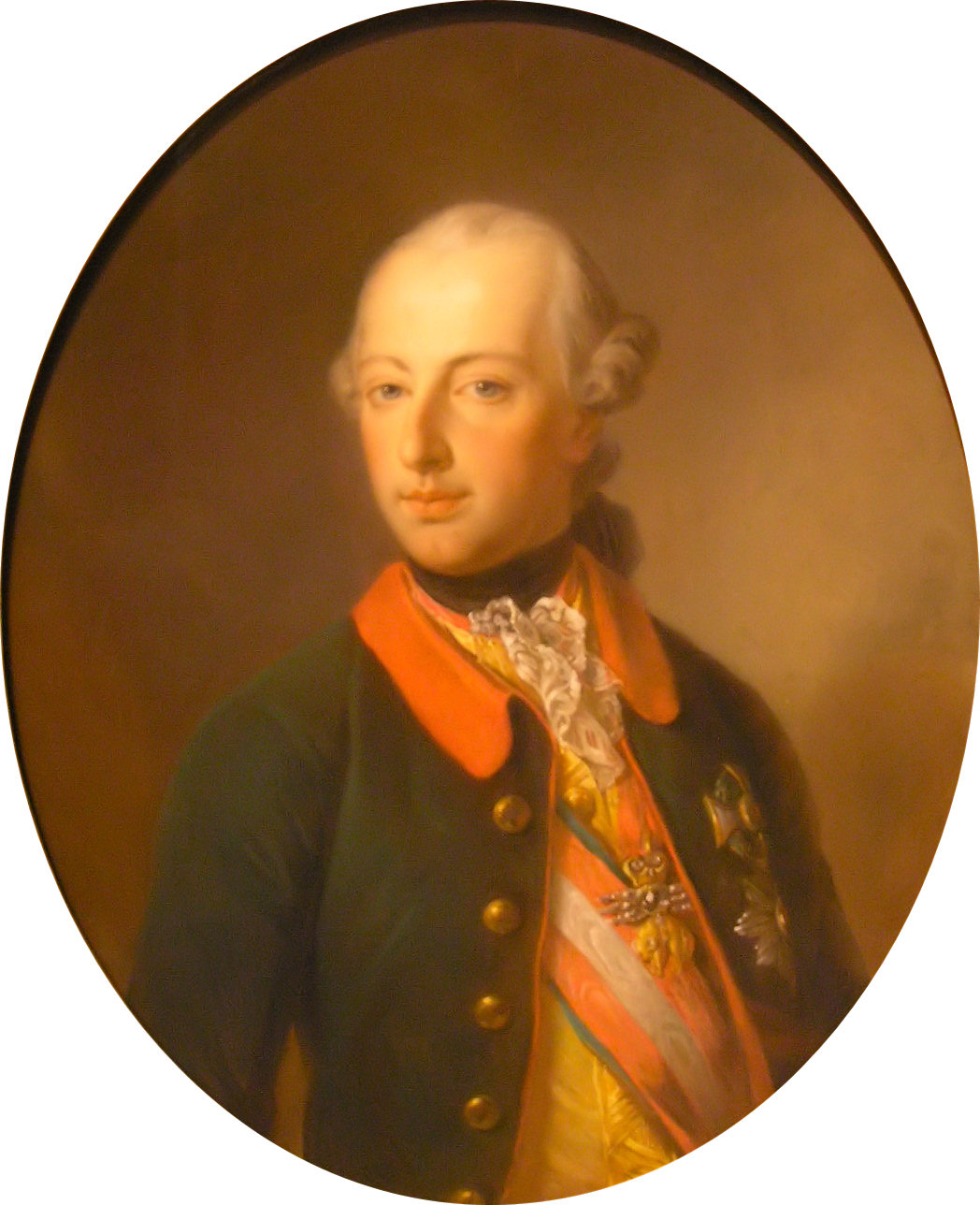
Portrait of Joseph II by Georg Decker

As representative for the Romanian peasants, Horea — whose official name was Vasile Ursu Nicola — traveled to Vienna often in the years from 1779 to 1782 to explain the hardships of the Transylvanian peasantry and lack of representation, without any result. The trigger of the events occurred on 31 January 1784, when Emperor Joseph II issued an order to increase the number of the border guards of Transylvania. Many men from many villages assembled in Alba Iulia (Hungarian: Gyulafehérvár, German: Karlsburg) to enroll in the army as an option to live better instead of the obligatory labor system to their landlords. Most of them were Romanian peasants.

The local authorities tried to slow down the process assuming the Gubernium got around and did not involve them. The people interpreted this action as the "nobility" opposing their chance for a better fate for their families. Horea spread a rumor that Joseph II appointed him as leader of the Romanians who wished to enroll into service, while Crișan called the serfs to revolt in the surrounding areas of the Crișul Alb (Fehér-Kőrös) river. Thereafter, more than ten thousand people united against the "nobility," who in their eyes were oppressors imposing high taxes on them. Shortly, the tensions culminated into a revolt, targeting the nobles and the non-Orthodox common people, mostly the peasantry (regardless of ethnicity), because they unfairly received opportunity for advancement in society. The massacres mostly affected the areas and population of Alsó-Fehér County, Zaránd County, and Hunyad County. Between the autumn of 1784 and the winter up to 1785, civilian casualties numbered about 4,000 people from 133 settlements, mostly Hungarians.

While the Gubernium and the military leadership debated about a possible intervention – awaiting the order from Vienna, the Hungarian nobility took action: they organized a defence; they captured and tried the rioters in Deva (Déva); and they executed 56 peasants.

When Joseph II ordered the army to intervene, the uprising was ended by Horea on 14 December 1784, at Câmpeni (Topánfalva, Topesdorf). In January 1785, the leaders were captured on charges of treason, after a bounty had been placed on their heads. Of the more than 600 captured rebels, 120 were sentenced; 37 death penalties were delivered initially but they were changed to imprisonment as a result of the amnesty of the emperor, with an exception regarding the three leaders. Horea and Cloșca were executed by the Hungarian authorities by breaking on the wheel on 28 February 1785 at Dealul Furcilor (Gabelberg, Forks Hill), Alba Iulia (Gyulafehérvár). Crișan hanged himself on the night before the execution.

== Legacy ==
The uprising shocked Emperor Joseph II and strengthened his conviction that the problems of the serfs required reform. On 2 August 1785, Joseph II abolished the serfs' attachment to the soil, reaffirming the provisions of his decree of 16 July 1783.

The uprising reverberated throughout Western Europe. It upset the feudal system and is considered by many to have inspired the French Revolution. In 1785, Jacques Pierre Brissot, who would become a leader of the French Revolution, published an open letter to Joseph II in which he asserted the right of royal subjects to protest.

In 1937, a monument in the form of an obelisk was erected in Alba Iulia to commemorate the revolt. It was designed by Iosif Fekete and Octavian Mihălțan.

During World War II, the Soviet Union created the Horea, Cloșca și Crișan Division which was named after the revolt. The division was made up of Romanian volunteers mainly drawn from prisoners of war and exiled communist activists.

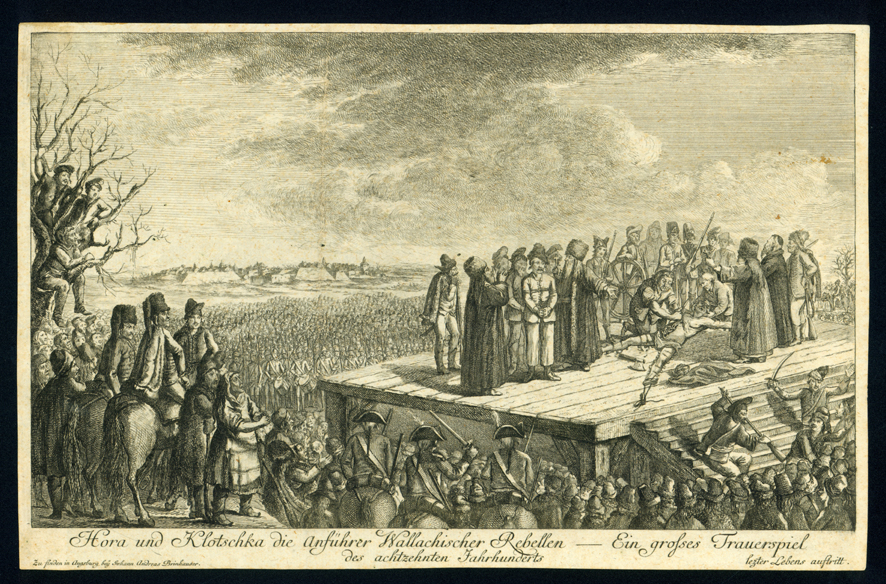
The execution of Horea and Cloșca

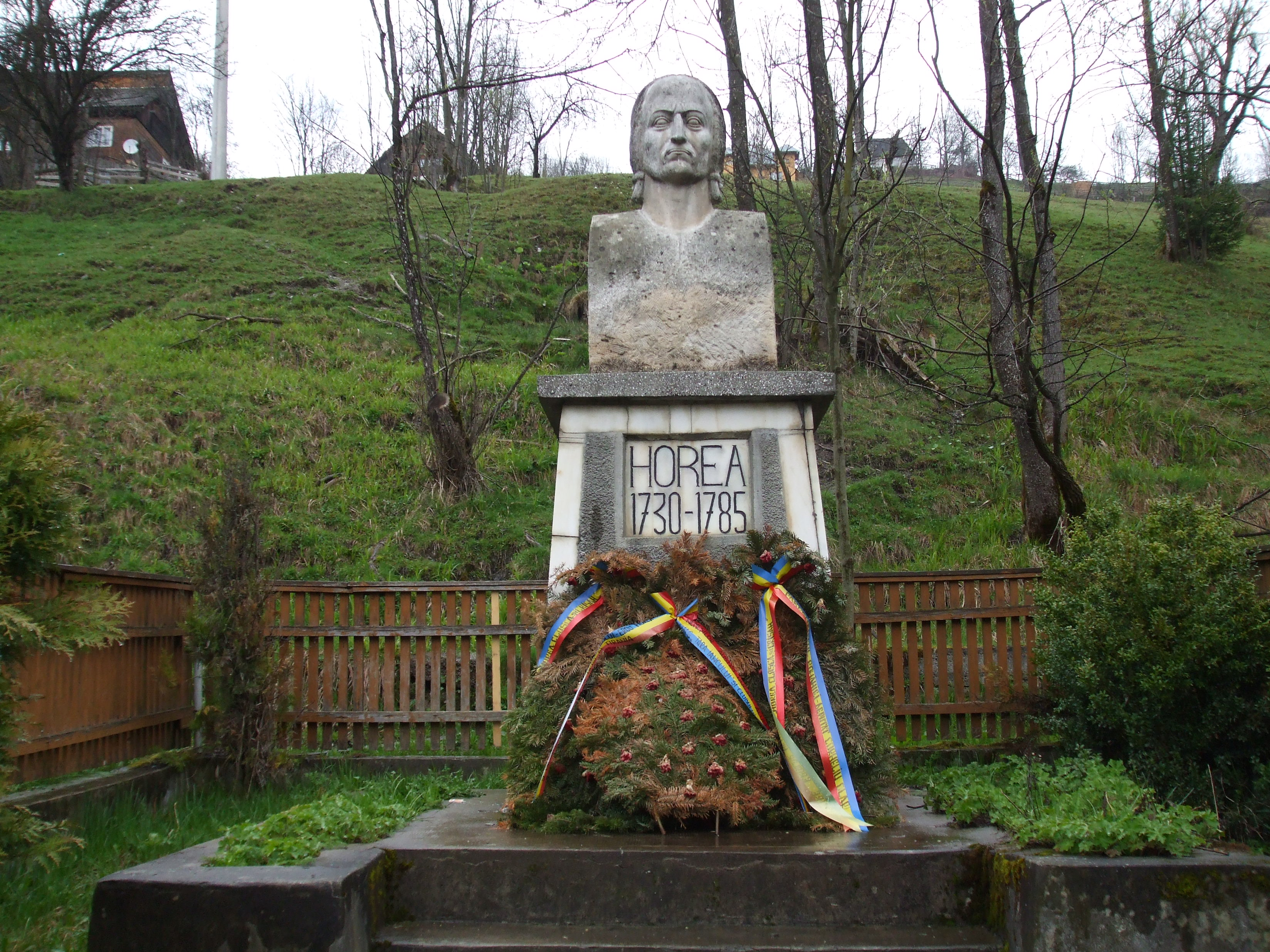
The bust of Horea in Horea Commune, Alba County

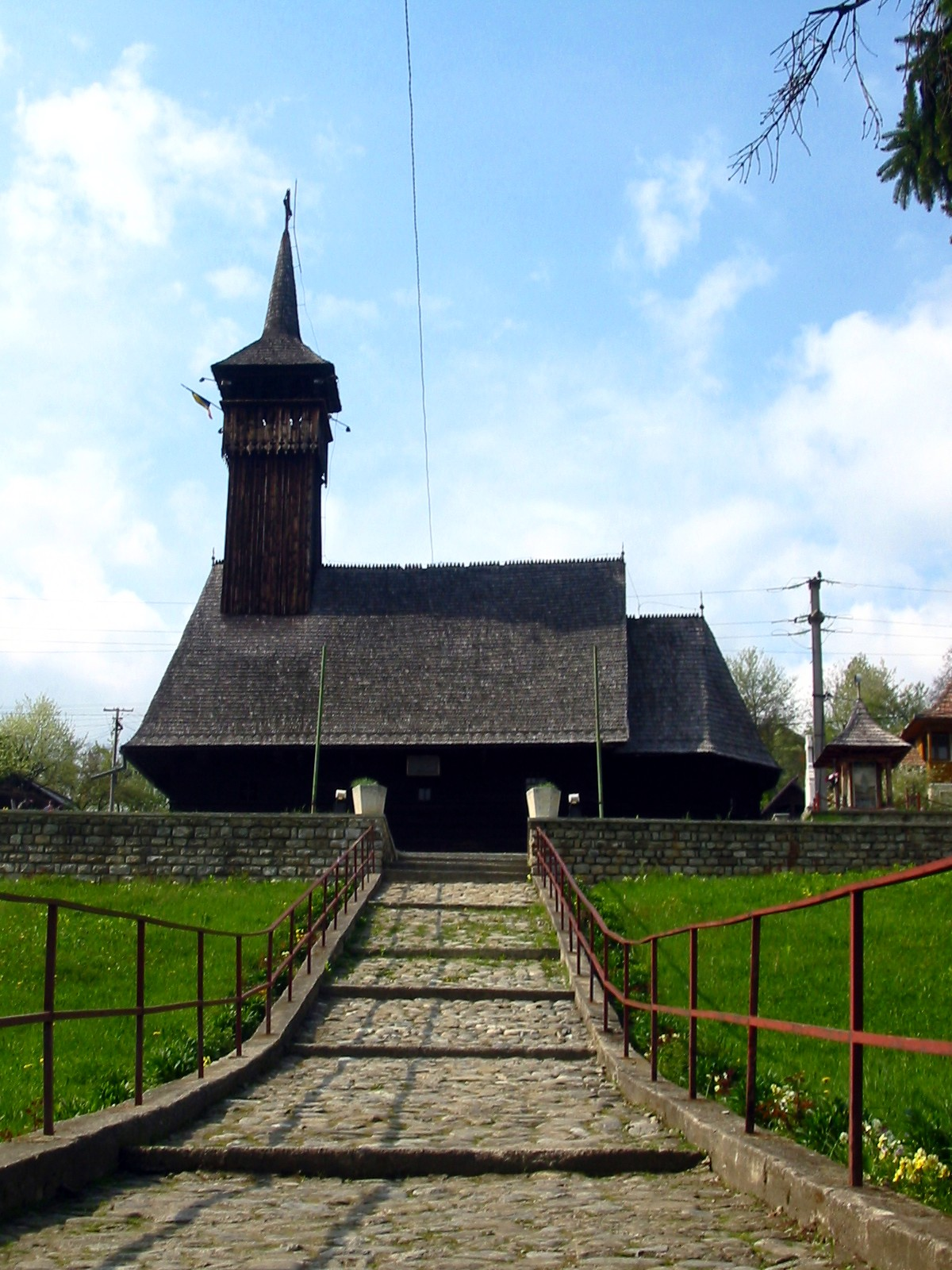
The wooden church in Horea's village

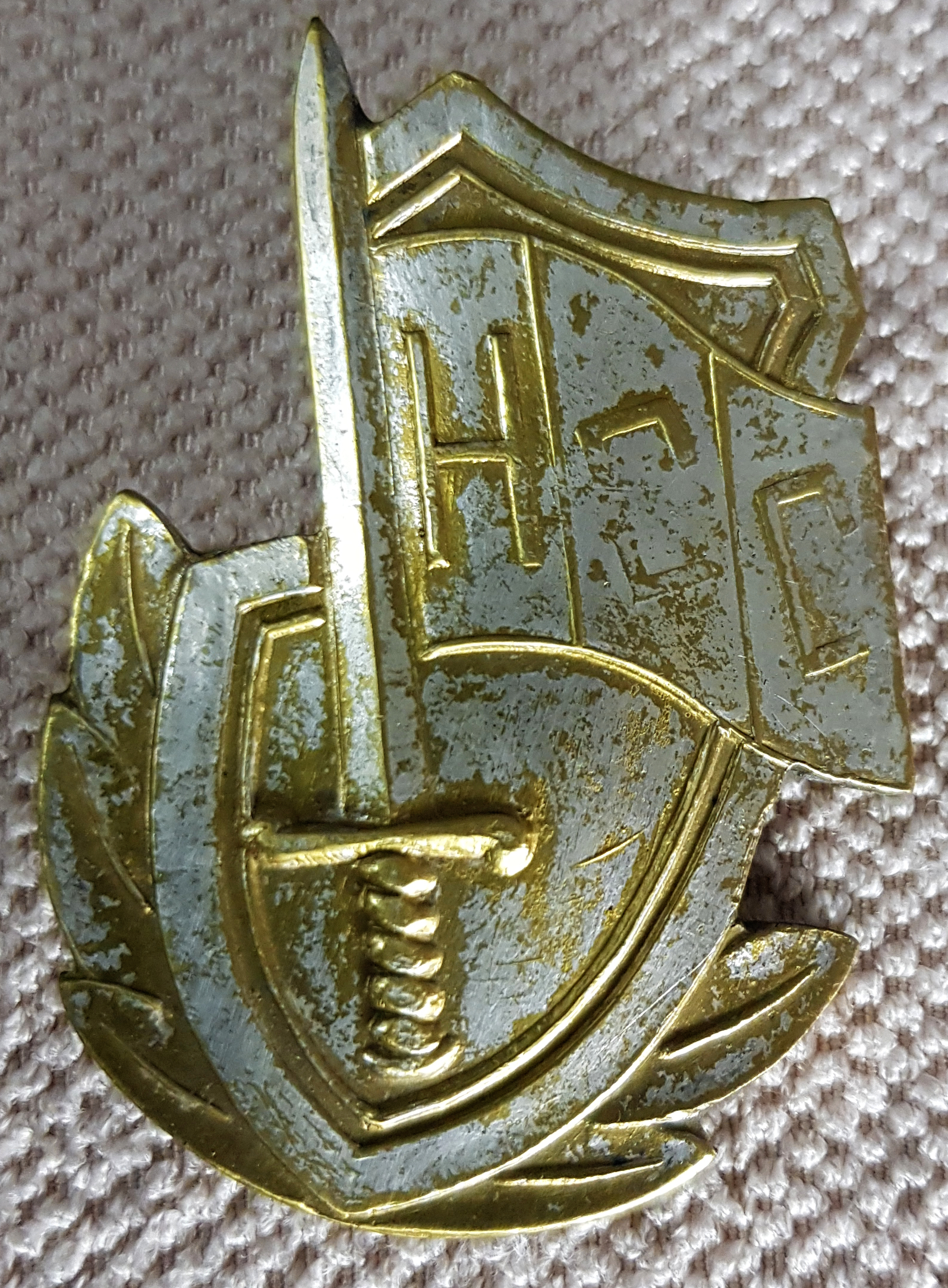
The divisional insignia of the Horea, Cloșca și Crișan Division

== See also ==
- Age of Revolution
- Horea, Cloșca și Crișan Division
- Jacques Pierre Brissot
- List of revolutions and rebellions
- List of rebellions in the Habsburg monarchy

== Sources ==
- Pascu, Ștefan (1984). Revoluția populară de sub conducerea lui Horea (in Romanian). București: Editura Militară. p. 534. OCLC 26020442.
- Prodan, David (1984) [1979]. Răscoala lui Horea. Vols 1 and 2 (in Romanian) (2nd ed.). București: Editura Științifică și Enciclopedică. OCLC 185620334.
- "Joseph II and enlightened absolutism: Policy toward Villeins and the Horea Uprising". mek.oszk.hu.
