= Vasile Ursu Nicola =

Transylvanian peasant and rebellion leader

Horea
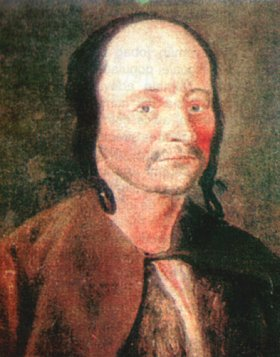
- Born: Vasile Ursu Nicola; 1731; Arada, Principality of Transylvania
- Died: February 28, 1785 (aged 53–54); Karlsburg, Habsburg Empire
- Cause of death: Execution by breaking wheel
- Known for: Revolt of Horea, Cloșca and Crișan
- Spouse: Ilina
- Children: Ion, Luca

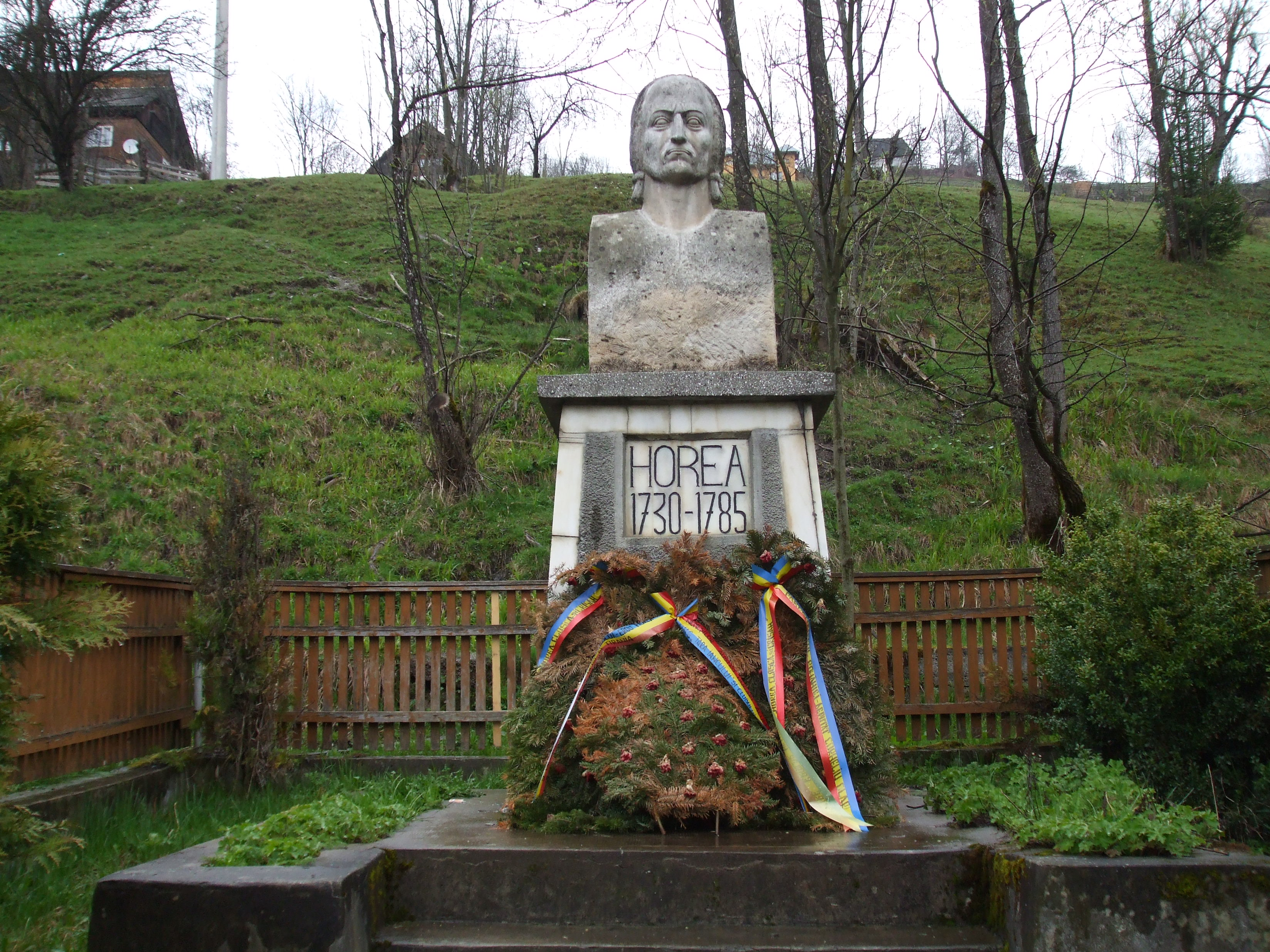
The bust of Horea in Horea Commune, Alba County

Vasile Ursu Nicola (1731 in Arada, Principality of Transylvania (now Horea, Romania) – 28 February 1785 in Karlsburg (now Alba Iulia, Romania)), commonly known as Horea (in Hungarian sometimes Hóra) was a Transylvanian peasant who, with Ion Oarga ("Cloșca") and Marcu Giurgiu ("Crișan"), led the two-month-long peasant rebellion that began in the Metaliferi Mountains villages of Curechiu and Mesteacăn in late 1784 and that was known as the Revolt of Horea, Cloșca and Crișan.

After the rebellion was put down, Crișan hanged himself in prison, and Horea and Cloșca were executed by being publicly broken on the wheel. Horea is a legendary figure and folk hero in Romania.

== Early life ==
Horea was born in Țara Moților, in the village of Arada, Principality of Transylvania (today known as Horea, in Alba County, Romania) on Fericet Hill. He was the son of poor peasants who gave him his baptismal name, Ursu (bear), in accordance with an old pagan custom of naming children after strong animals or vigorous trees. In his youth he acquired the nickname Horea, because he played a flute-like instrument called the horea. One source describes him as having two brothers, Peter and Damian, and a sister, while another source mentions only one brother, Gavrilă. Horea was married to Ilina, with whom he had two sons, Ion and Luca, the former of whom participated alongside his father in the rebellion.

== Career ==
Horea was a craftsman who built wooden churches, some of which still exist, among them the church in Cizer (Csizér) which dates back to 1773 and was moved in 1967 (or 1968) to the National Museum of Transylvanian History in Cluj-Napoca. The words “worked by Ursu H” are carved on the nave's beam in Cyrillic letters. Horea is also said to have taken part in the construction of the Orthodox Moon Church in Oradea (Hungarian: Nagyvárad, German: Großwardein). Although a serf, he is supposed to have been able to read and write. Between 1770 and 1773, he lived with his family in Ciucea (Csucsa, Tschetsch).

Ever since the incorporation of Transylvania — known in German as Siebenbürgen — into the Habsburg domains in 1691, the situation of the Romanian peasants in this region, who were Orthodox Christians, had been particularly precarious. While Hungarians, Székelys, and Germans (Transylvanian Saxons) enjoyed certain rights and privileges, however, the Romanians still had no representation in politics. The Romanian peasants were serfs with no individual freedom, and had no support for their ecclesiastical institutions. Moreover, they paid high taxes to their feudal nobles, who were mostly Hungarian Catholics, as well as to the Emperor.

Probably because he was literate, Horea became the spokesman for the Romanian peasants, traveling to Vienna on four occasions between 1779 and 1784 to present their grievances in personal audiences with Emperor Joseph II. On his first journey to Vienna he was accompanied by Dumitru Todea and Cloșca, and, according to one source, Gavrilă, who is identified as his brother. On his second excursion to Vienna, in 1780, he was accompanied only by Cloșca; it was on this occasion that the Emperor is said to have ordered him to investigate the motives behind the Hungarians’ mistreatment of the Serbs and, particularly, the Romanians. His third trip was in 1782; his final Vienna sojourn, in 1783, lasted a year.

The fact that a serf was received by the Emperor himself suggests that Horea had supporters at court. One source suggests that his sponsor at court was the Austrian geologist Ignatius Born, who had estates in Alba on which Horea worked, and that Horea, when in Vienna, stayed at Born’s home. It is known that Joseph II was, at this time, in conflict with the nobility in Transylvania, because he wished to bring an end to the feudal system and wanted Romanian serfs to be able to join his army, something the nobles forbade because it would deprive them of free labor. Horea is said to have told his fellow Romanian serfs that the Emperor had authorized him to encourage them to wipe out the Hungarian nobility of Transylvania. In any event, during the period when Horea represented them, the Romanian peasants’ situation worsened – their working hours were increased and their right to exploit the forests was taken from them.

On January 31, 1784, Joseph ordered an increase in the number of border guards in Transylvania, and peasants from around the region, including many from Romania, traveled to Alba Iulia (Gyulafehérvár, Karlsburg) to enroll in the army and thus escape the exploitative feudal system. When the Romanian serfs got the impression that officials in Karlsburg were resisting their efforts to enroll, a feeling of having been betrayed spread among them.

== Rebellion ==
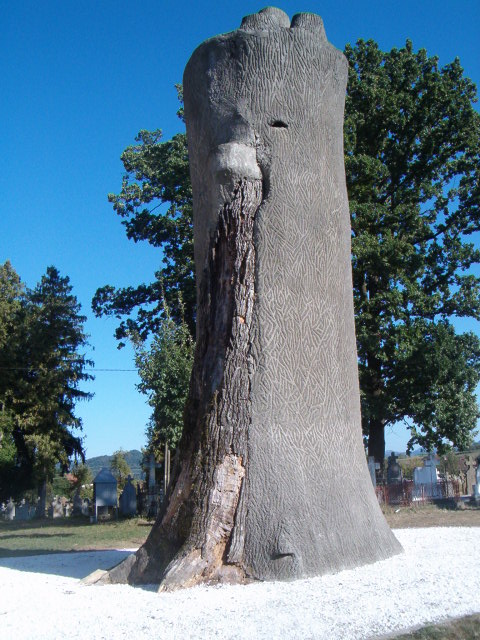
Horea's Sessile Oak in Țebea, the village where the rebellion started

On October 28, 1784, under a bridge at the weekly fair in Brad (Brád, Tannenhof), Crișan met with peasants from villages in the area and told them to send representatives to the village of Mesteacăn (Mesztákon) three days later. On October 31, around 600 peasants gathered there with Crișan and Cloșca, who displayed a golden cross that they said Joseph had given to Horea. The emperor, they claimed, had instructed Horea to enlist peasants in a struggle by the army to eliminate serfdom.

A large number of peasants led by Horea then headed for Alba Iulia to join the army, but on the night of November 1 they were attacked by Hungarian nobility's troops in the village of Curechiu (Kurety). Repelling the attack, the peasants returned to Brad. On October 2, a number of peasants led by Crișan attacked the noble court in Criscior (Kristyór, Kreischquell), and on October 3 they defeated the Hungarian army at Ribița (Ribice). Cloșca and his men went on to conquer Câmpeni (Topánfalva, Topesdorf), Abrud (Abrudbánya, Großschlatten), and the Arieș (Aranyos) valley. By October 5, the revolt had spread to the counties of Alsó-Fehér, Hunyad, Kolozs, Arad, Szilágy, and Maros-Torda.

The number of peasants involved in the revolt eventually numbered in the thousands. The uprising ravaged the whole of Transylvania, and resulted in the destruction of many castles and manor houses, especially those belonging to the Hungarian aristocracy. They brutally massacred nobles and Catholics, most of them Hungarians, and sacked churches. They captured some nobles, but let them go if they agreed to convert to the Orthodox faith. While going after Hungarian targets, they let Austrian soldiers alone and refrained from sacking imperial properties.

On November 11, 1784, Horea dispatched an ultimatum to the nobles in which he demanded that the nobility be abolished, that the nobles abandon their estates, and that the estates be divided among the common folk.

Meanwhile, many of the Hungarian nobles had retreated to the city of Deva (Déva, Diemrich). Fighting resumed, with extensive losses. A truce was agreed to, with Cloșca signing it at Tibru (Tibor, Tiburg) and Horea at Valea Bradului (Vályabrád), and the Austrians agreed to send the rebels’ demands to the emperor. But the local governor refused to accept the arrangement and called off negotiations. Crișan, who did not trust the Habsburgs, continued to fight, defeating a large army at Lupșa (Lupsa) on November 27. When no response from Vienna was forthcoming, Horea called for a resumption of hostilities, whereupon the governor tried to restore calm by offering the rebels a general amnesty. The peasant army won a series of victories against the Austrian army, but on December 7 the Austrians defeated the peasants in a decisive battle in Mihăileni, in which the peasants suffered great losses.

On December 14, at Câmpeni, Horea told the peasants to return to their homes but said that they would resume fighting in the spring. Horea and Cloșca then retreated to the Gilău Mountains, where they were betrayed by locals and arrested by Austrian soldiers on December 27. Crișan was captured on January 30. All three were taken to Alba Iulia (Gyulafehérvár, Karlsburg), where they were interrogated by the Austrians. At first dozens of rebels were sentenced to be killed, but Joseph II granted them amnesties, and ordered that only the three leaders should be executed.

== Execution ==
On February 26, the three men were sentenced to death on the wheel, and several thousand Romanian peasants were brought in to witness their execution. On the night of February 27, 1785, Crișan had hanged himself in prison, taking advantage of the negligence of his guards. The next day, Horea and Cloșca were broken on the wheel at Dealul Furcilor (Gabelberg, Forks Hill), Alba Iulia. Their bodies were then cut into pieces, which were scattered at various villages to serve as a warning to future would-be rebels.

After the suppression of the rebellion, Horea’s son Ion was deported to Banat. He managed several times to escape and return to Transylvania, but he was caught and returned each time.

Horea’s home was preserved until 1898, when it was bought by Ion C. Brătianu and moved to his estate at Florica.

== Legacy ==
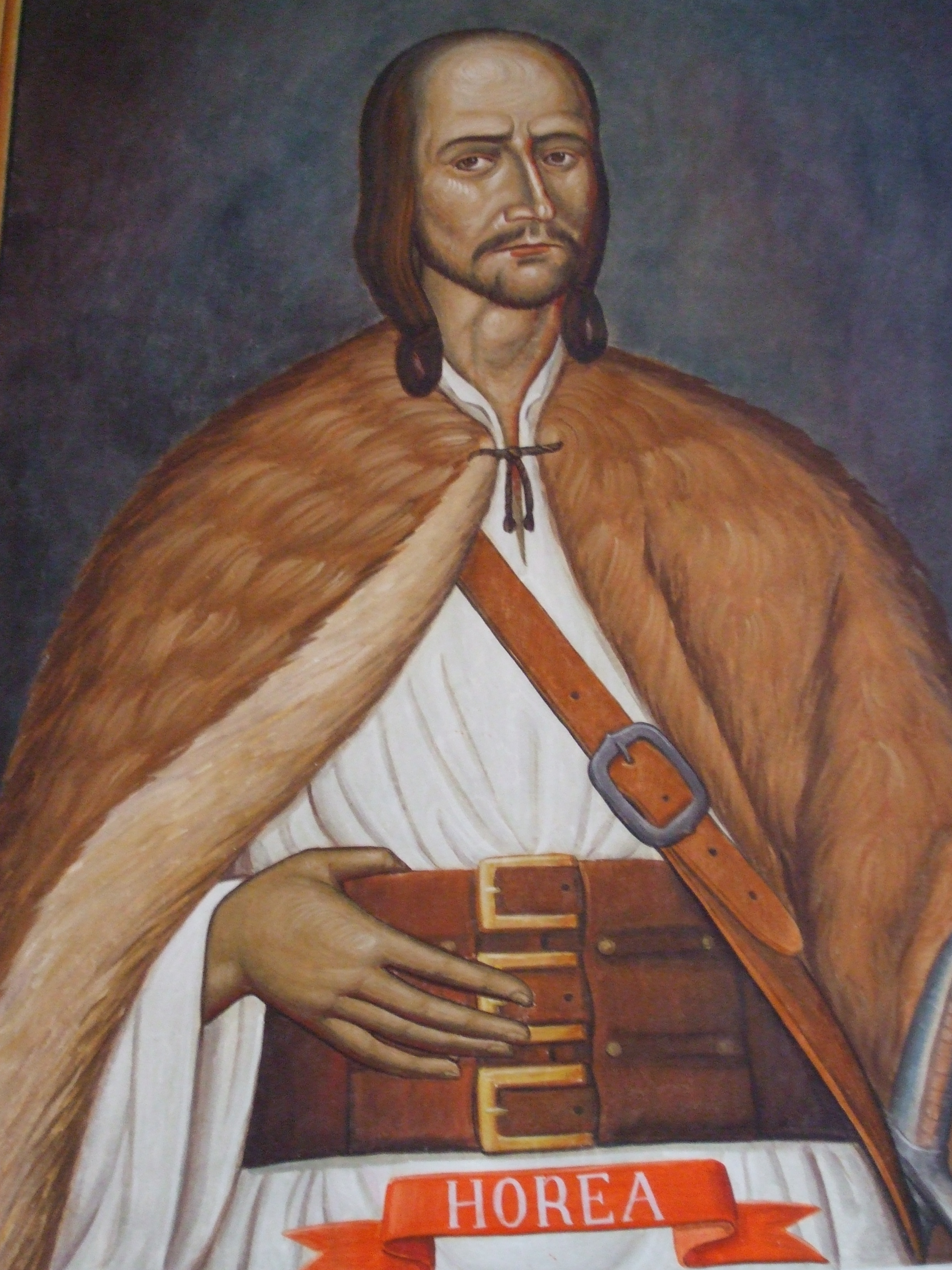
Painting of Horea, from a church in Horea Commune

In 1785, Joseph II ordered an end to serfdom, although the feudal system continued to be practiced for several more decades. The Emperor also ended aristocratic control over peasant marriages and expanded the peasants’ grazing rights.

The peasant rebellion had repercussions throughout Europe. It shook up the feudal system and is considered by many to have inspired the French Revolution. In 1785 Jacques Pierre Brissot, who would become a leader of the French Revolution, published an open letter to Joseph II in which he asserted the right of royal subjects to protest.

Horea is considered a folk hero who helped Romanians to see themselves as a people and a nation deserving of independence and freedom. Many authors have written about him. He was the subject of a 1937 opera, Horia, by Nicolae Bretan.

A film about him was released in 1984. His native village was renamed in his honor, and more than thirty streets all over Romania are named for him, as are at least two churches. Several schools, moreover, are named for all three rebel leaders.
