= Ski mountaineering =

Skiing discipline

Examples of ski mountaineering

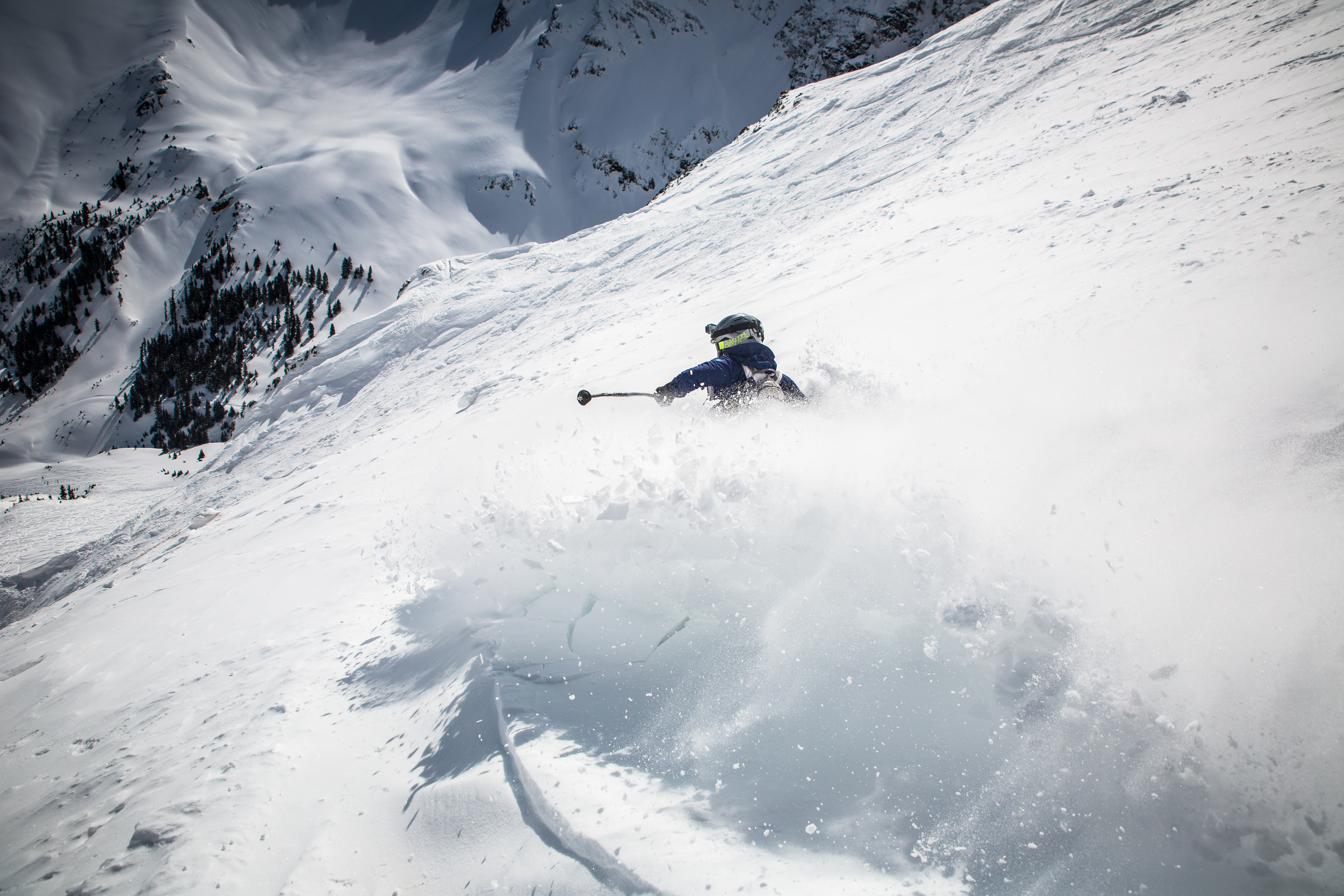
Backcountry, Colorado, United States

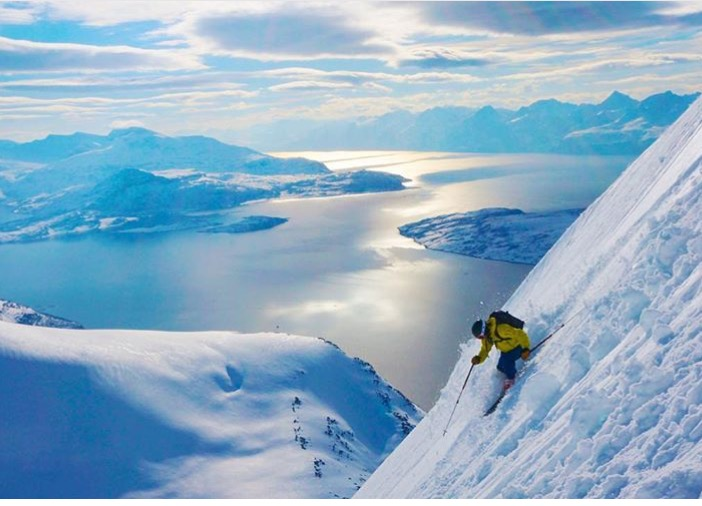
Mountain, Norway

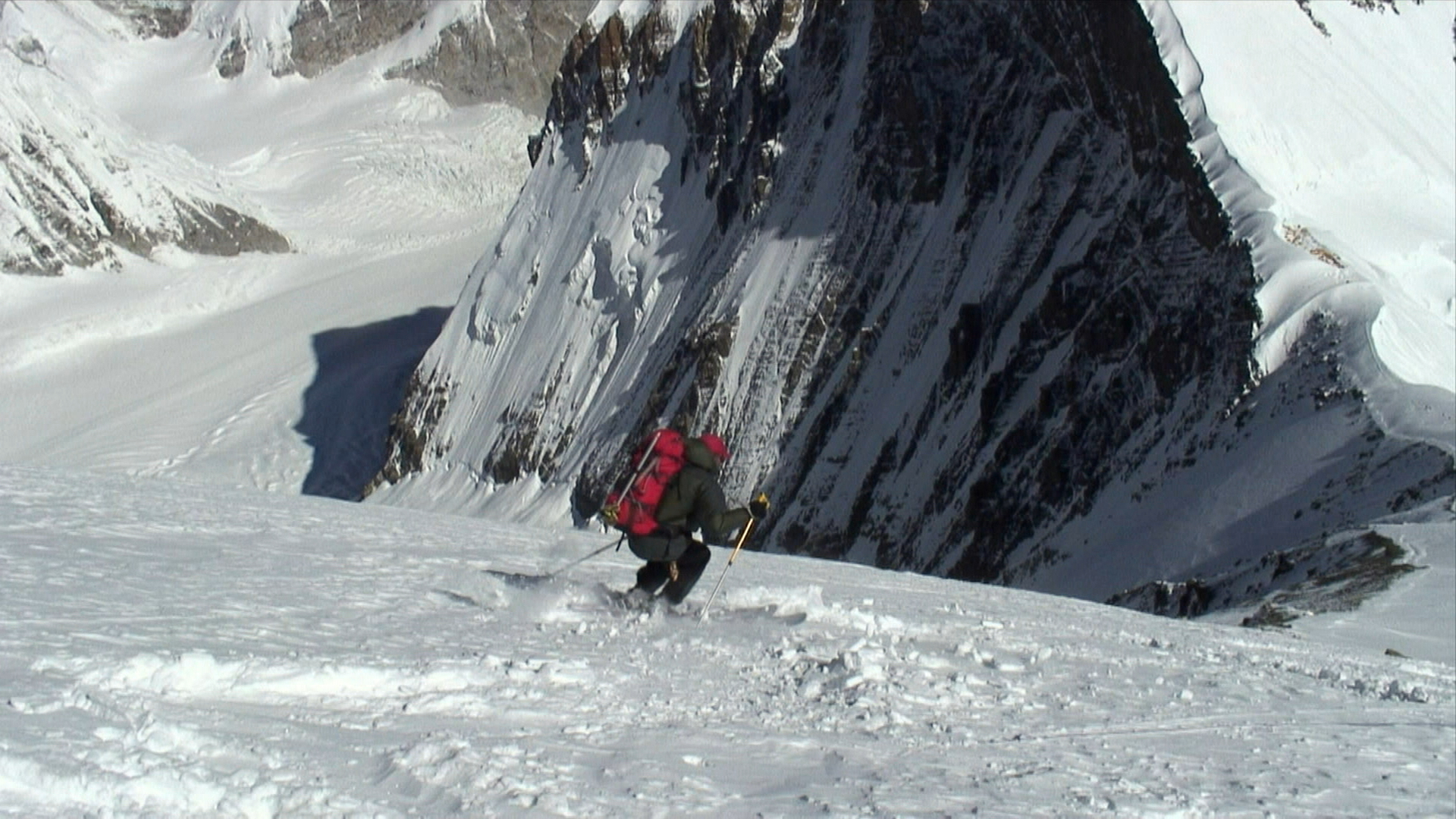
High-altitude, Everest, Nepal

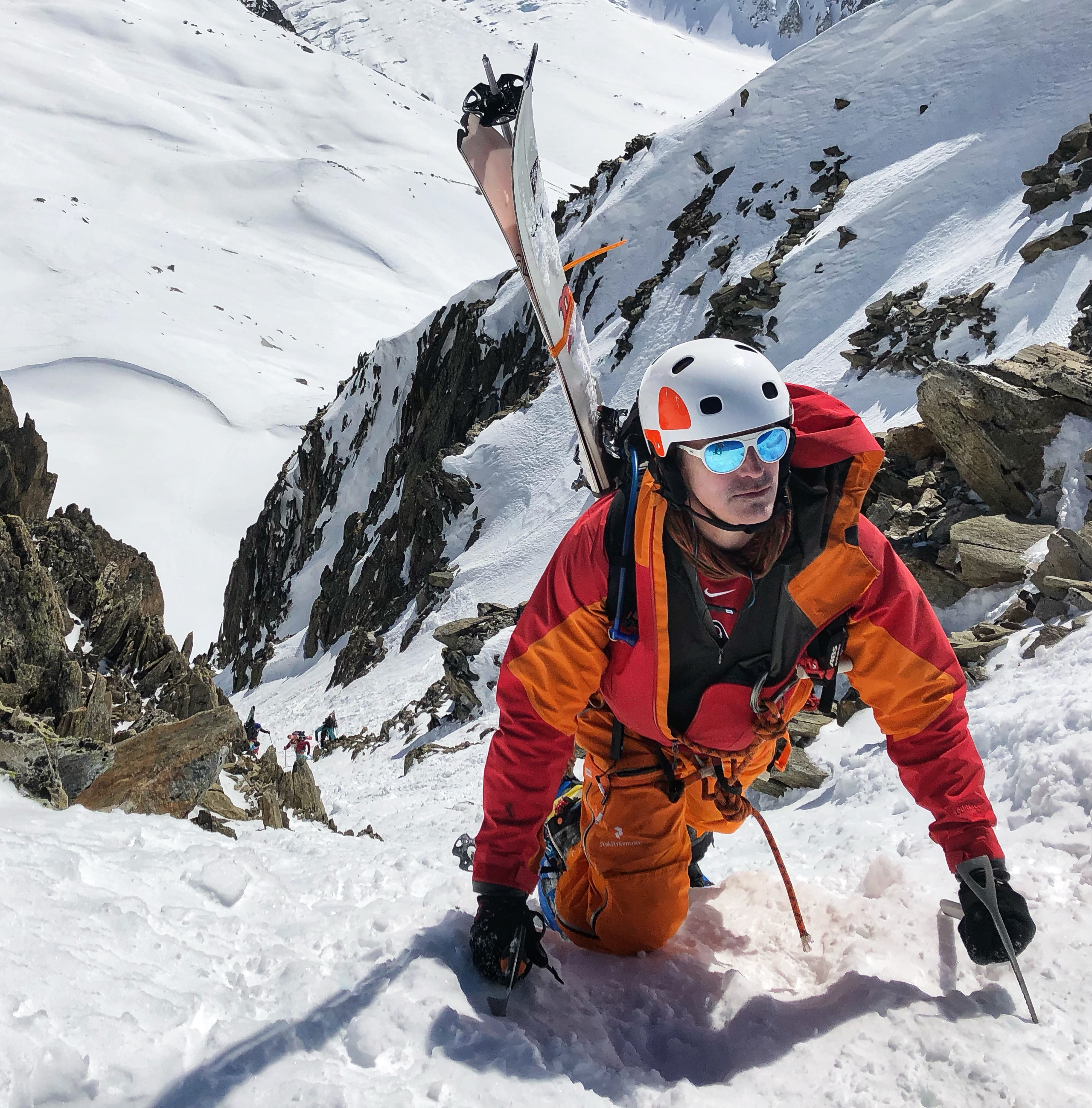
Couloir, Chamonix, France

Ski mountaineering is a skiing discipline that involves climbing mountains either on skis or carrying them, depending on the steepness of the ascent, and then descending on skis. There are two major categories of equipment used: free-heel telemark skis and skis based on alpine skis, where the heel is free for ascents, but is fixed during descent. Ski mountaineering is an activity that variously combines ski touring, telemark, backcountry skiing, and mountaineering.

In 2026, ski mountaineering racing—a distinct sub-discipline—made its debut in the 2026 Winter Olympics.

== Equipment ==
- Bindings: Should be reliable, light, and durable.
- Boots: Should be light and flexible.
- Skis: Width: 60–90 mm to balance performance and weight. Skinnier skis lack performance in softer snow but are lighter while wider skis lack performance in firmer snow and are heavier. Lightweight skis make ascent easier. Length depends on a person's height but going shorter than your normal length will be lighter and will be easier on steep terrain.
- Ski skins: Attached to bottoms of skis, used for walking up slopes.
- Rope: Are not always used in ski mountaineering, but if the approach to the summit or drop-in is treacherous, having a rope can help mitigate risk. When choosing a rope, one needs to make sure it is a proper climbing rope, paracord and ropes found in gas stations (or any rope not intended specifically for mountain climbing), are not suitable. Some popular climbing rope companies are Sterling, Mammut and Black Diamond.
- Crampons: Are used to help walk and climb on hard packed snow and ice. They usually have 10 or 12 spikes and are secured to your boot using three different methods. The first method is strap-on crampons which are attached by stepping into a basket and then securing with webbing and these fit with any type of boot. The second is hybrid or semi-automatic crampons. These use the welt on the back of your boot along with a basket in the front to hold onto your boot, and also use webbing to help secure them; these are made to work with a certain type of boot. The final type of crampon is an automatic or step-in crampon. These use both the back and front welt on a person's boot with webbing to secure them to the boot. These types of crampons are the most secure, but also the most specialized crampon and need specific boots to have them work.
- Touring bindings: Lightweight alpine touring or telemark bindings. For AT, the pin style toes are the lightest and tour the best.
- Avalanche search and rescue equipment: Beacon (transceiver) – digital transceiver, Probe – at least 2 meters in length, Shovel – any snow shovel works but collapsible shovels are more lightweight and packable, Snow kit- used to help examine snow and snow quality.
- Ice axe: Used to assist safety in steep snow and ice. No longer than 60 cm, 50–55 cm is preferred.

== See also ==
- Extreme skiing
- Ski touring
