= Backcountry skiing =

Skiing in unmarked or unpatrolled areas

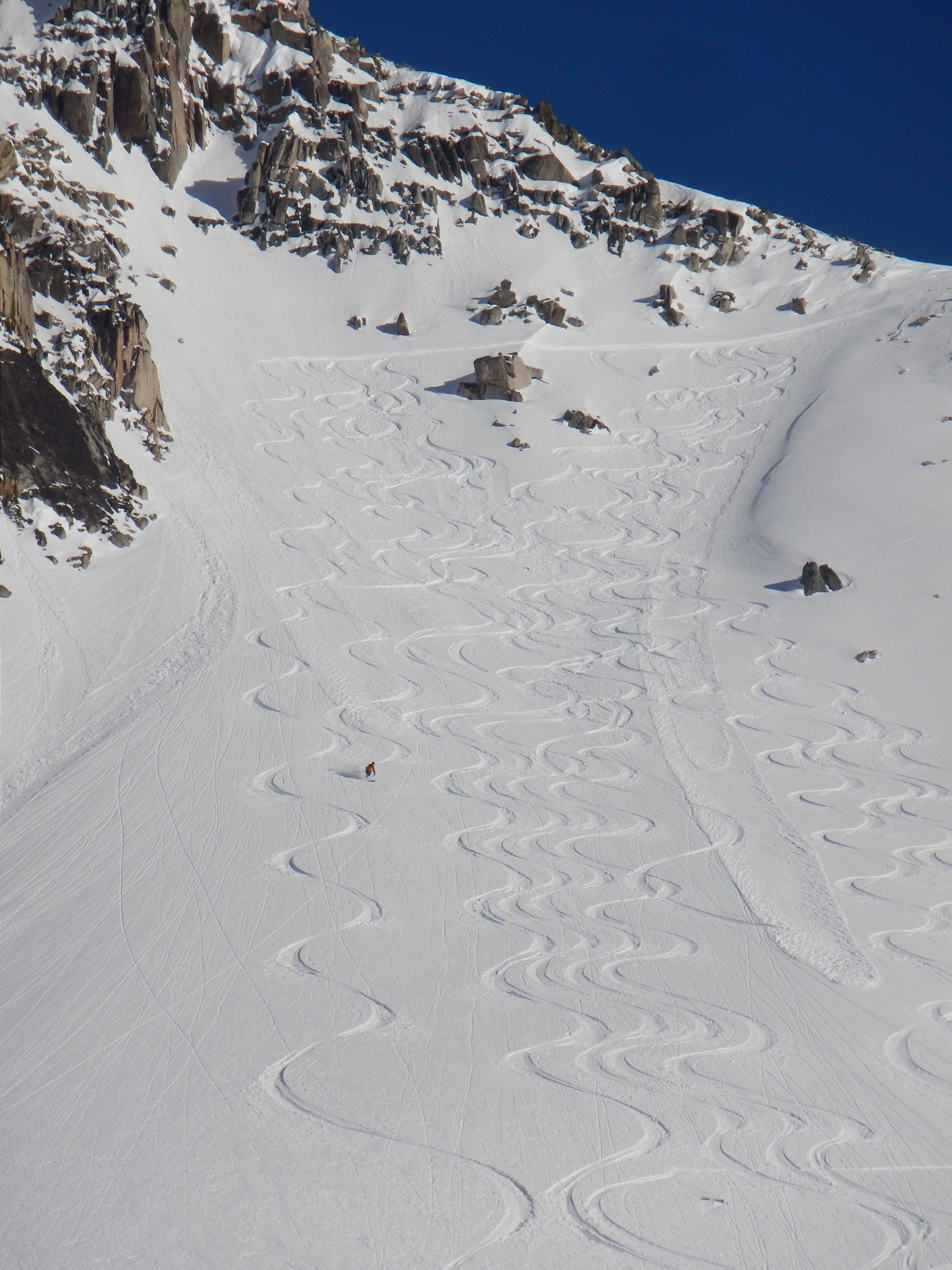
A set of backcountry ski runs in the Battle Range of the Canadian Rocky Mountains. Notice a minor avalanche has occurred at the right of frame.

Backcountry skiing (US), also called off-piste (Europe), alpine touring, freeriding or out-of-area, is skiing in the backcountry on unmarked or unpatrolled areas either inside or outside a ski resort's boundaries. This contrasts with alpine skiing, which is typically done on groomed trails benefiting from a ski patrol. Unlike ski touring, backcountry skiing can – and often does – include the use of ski lifts including snowcats and helicopters. Recent improvements in equipment have increased the popularity of the sport. As the sport does confront the individual practicing it with the dangers of natural, unprepared alpine terrain like avalanches, it is generally recommended to carry standard safety equipment and to learn beforehand how to behave safely under such conditions.

== Terminology ==
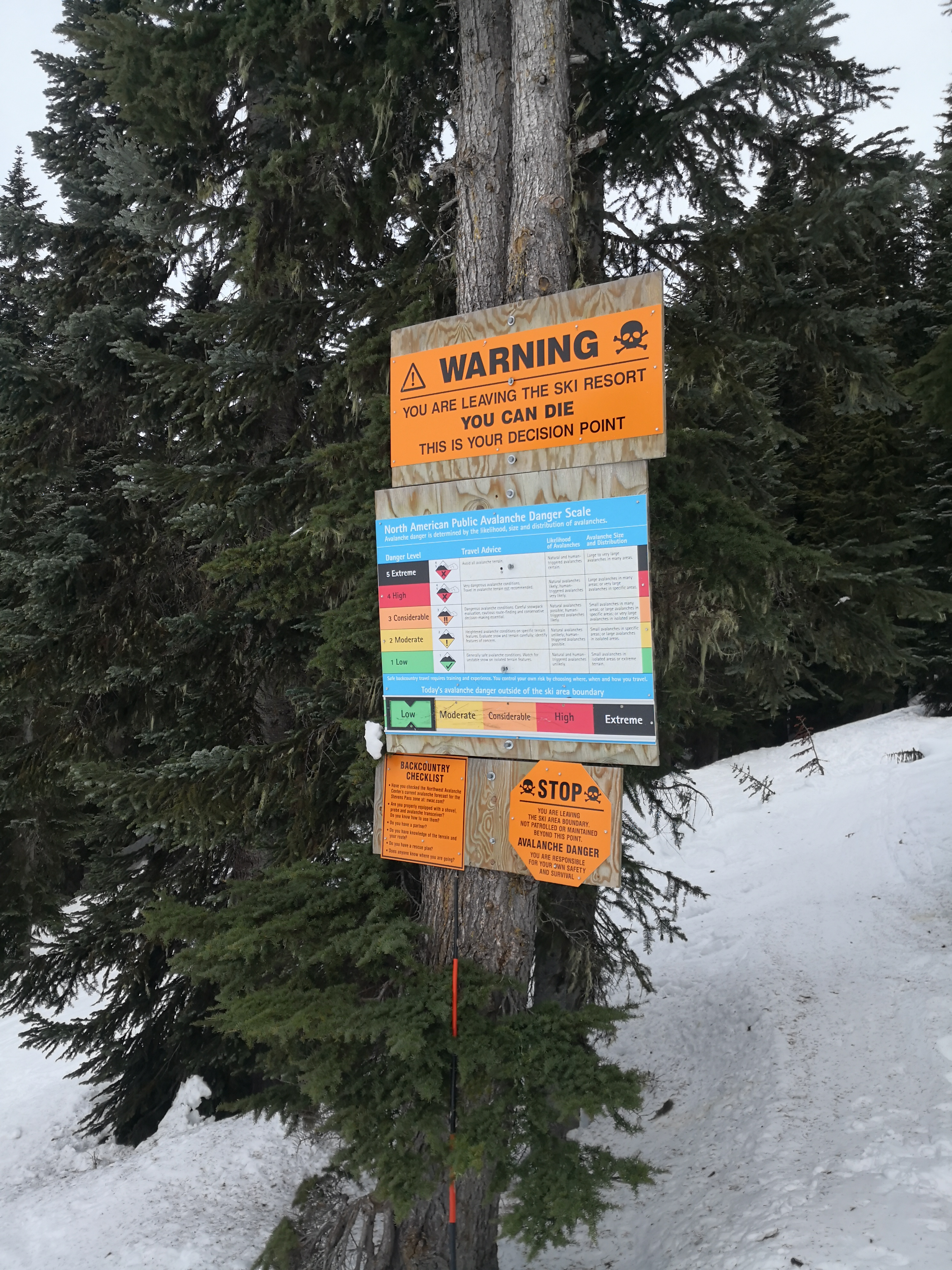
Warning sign at the ski resort boundary of Stevens Pass. Many tracks leaving the ski area nearby indicate people enjoying sidecountry tree skiing.

The terms "backcountry" and "off-piste" refer to where the skiing is being done, while terms like ski touring, ski mountaineering, telemark, freeriding, and extreme skiing describe what type of skiing is being done. Terms for backcountry skiing exist according to how the terrain is accessed, and how close it is to services. Backcountry can include the following:

- Frontcountry: off-trail within ski area boundaries where ski lifts and emergency services are close at hand.
- Slackcountry: terrain outside of the ski area boundary that is accessed from a lift without having to use skins or bootpack. Usually this also includes area with access back to the lift as well. For purists, this could also include where people use a car as a shuttle.
- Sidecountry: terrain outside marked ski area boundaries yet accessible via ski lift. Typically sidecountry requires the skier to hike, skin, or climb within ski area boundaries to reach or return from the sidecountry area, or both.
- Backcountry: skiing in remote areas not within ski area boundaries.

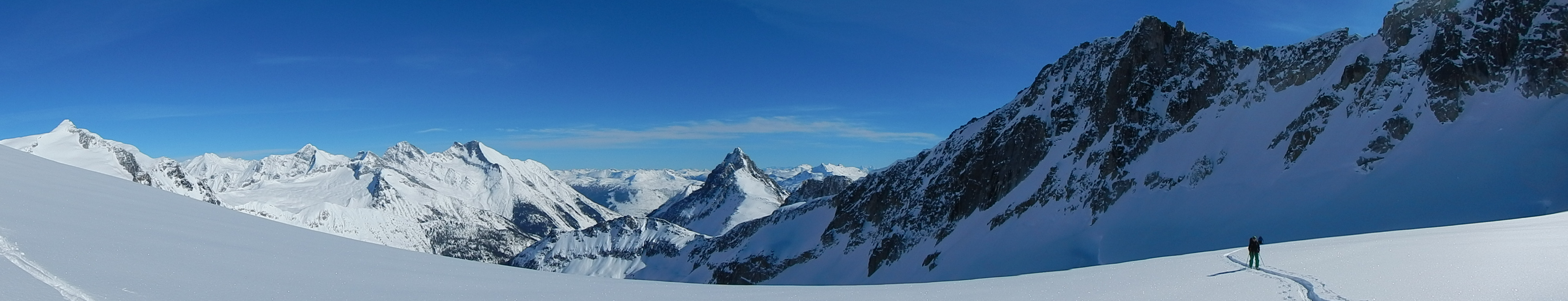
Backcountry skiers skinning up in British Columbia

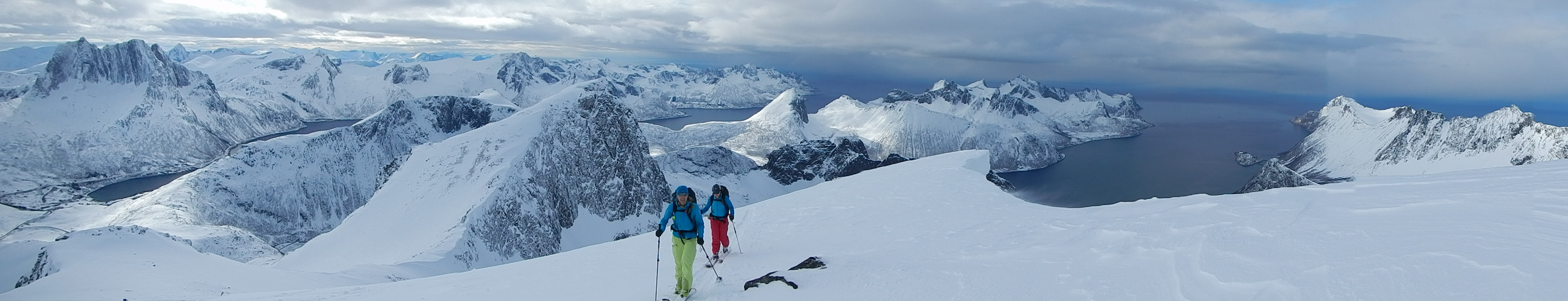
Backcountry skiers skinning up in Norway

== Gear ==
There are two commonly referred to types of gear for backcountry skiing: equipment and education. Traveling on snow in the backcountry requires additional technical and safety equipment to efficiently and safely tour outside of monitored or patrolled areas. Gear choices for skiers and snowboarders depend on a variety of elements including type of skiing or snowboarding that a user will be engaging in, primary terrain and snow conditions, expense, skill level and personal skiing style, and safety concerns.

=== Skis or Snowboard ===
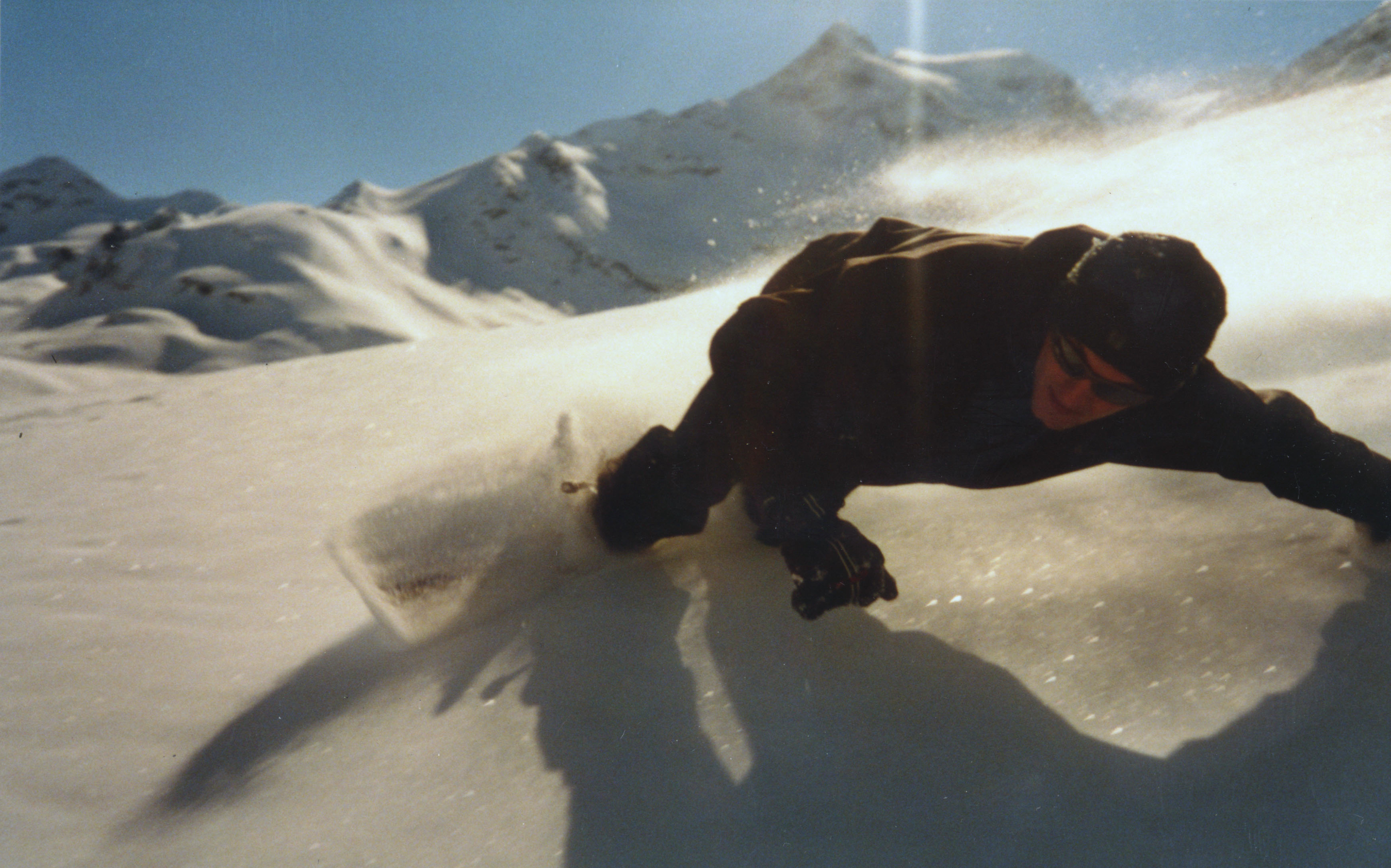
Snowboarding in deep powder is technically easier than skiing and much faster to learn. One reason is that there is naturally no requirement to keep the skis parallel, one of the main difficulties when skiing in deep snow.

Alpine skiers, telemark skiers, and snowboarders all access the backcountry. The type of skis or snowboards that perform well in the backcountry are lightweight and optimized for long-distance uphill traveling. Snowboarders often use splitboards that separate down the middle of the board and allow a rider to hike uphill using skins. If not using a splitboard, snowboarders usually require snowshoes to hike in snow and winter conditions. While nearly any ski will technically suffice for backcountry skiing, a lightweight model is often preferred to reduce the amount of effort it takes to hike uphill. Since a significant portion of touring in the backcountry consists of uphill hiking, increasing comfort in these scenarios makes a tour more enjoyable. Narrower skis are lighter than fat skis, but many skiers prefer lightweight, fatter models that may be heavier but do not sacrifice performance in deep snow, which is a common desire for skiing off-piste. This tradeoff is common in backcountry skis, but manufacturers attempt to narrow this gap each year.

The bindings play a significant role when touring in the backcountry. Ideally, bindings are lightweight and should have a free-pivot touring mode (of particular note for telemark bindings).

=== Skins ===
Ski skins allow skis to travel uphill. A narrow strip of nylon or mohair fabric designed to mimic sealskin and allow skis to slide forward, uphill, but not backwards, downhill. Synthetic skins typically grip better while mohair skins made from Angora Goat hair slide better. Commonly, skins are attached to skis or a splitboard with a loop on the toe of the ski, a reusable adhesive on the base of the skin to stick to the base of the skis, and a clip on the tail. They are usually a few millimeters narrower than the skis to allow the ski edges to still grip the snow. Most skiers purchase skins to closely match the width of their ski and then cut them to a more precise fit, but there are some ski-specific skins that are usually designed to reduce weight as much as possible by optimizing ski and skin elements to fit together perfectly.

=== Bindings ===
Bindings for backcountry skiing are slightly different from alpine skiing in order to accommodate uphill skinning maneuvers. Telemark bindings that leave the heel free to flex off the ski developed in the 1970s contributed to the growth in popularity of skiing in the backcountry. Modern alpine touring, or "A.T." bindings come in two distinct styles: tech and frame bindings. Tech bindings utilize a pin technology that lock into specialized touring ski boots. Frame bindings are compatible with any alpine ski boot. Tech bindings are lighter in weight and the boots are designed for a high degree of comfort. Frame bindings are designed for more aggressive skiing and are more often used in both the front, side, and backcountry.

=== Boots ===
Backcountry skiing boots are different from alpine skiing boots primarily in that they have a "walk mode" and a "ski mode." The walk mode allows for ankle flexion while the ski mode locks the cuff of the boot into place for a ski descent. Tech binding compatible boots are also designed with additional features useful in hiking and mountaineering pursuits including a rockered sole and rubber lugs that aid in bootpacking and climbing.

=== Poles ===
Poles for backcountry skiing do not differ substantially from alpine skiing. There are adjustable poles that can be lengthened and shortened for flatter traverses and steeper uphills, respectively, but they are not crucial.

=== Avalanche beacon ===
A beacon is an essential item for anyone planning on skiing in the backcountry. An avalanche beacon is a battery powered radio transceiver that is used for emergency location. Skiers activate the beacon at the outset of a ski tour. If an avalanche occurs, skiers that have remained safe switch their beacons to "receive" signals from buried victims to begin emergency search and rescue procedures. A beacon is a useless piece of gear without the knowledge to use it properly and ability to conduct an emergency search and rescue. Skiers will practice with members of a touring group to refresh skills and build confidence in the life saving capabilities of their skiing partners. An avalanche beacon is not considered a preventive measure to mitigate avalanche risk, but rather a tool to reduce the amount of time buried should one be caught in an avalanche.

=== Probe ===
An avalanche probe is used in conjunction with a beacon and shovel to physically locate a buried victim. Avalanche probes are collapsible poles about 9–10 feet (2.7–3.0 m) in length that are used to probe the snow for buried avalanche victims. In an avalanche, a beacon will indicate the location of a victim to within a meter or two, and the probe will pinpoint the victim's location. Strong skills and enough practice with both a beacon and probe allow backcountry skiers to more efficiently find victims, thereby increasing their chances at survival.

=== Shovel ===
A small, often collapsible snow shovel is used to dig out a victim in the event of an avalanche or other burial event. Avalanche shovels are also used to dig snow pits and perform stability tests to analyze the history of the snowpack, and they can also be useful for building jumps and other freestyle features in the backcountry. While avalanche shovels can vary in size and length, the one feature they all have in common is a metal blade. This is because when snow debris from an avalanche sets, it hardens into a firm pack resembling concrete and will shatter plastic blades.

=== Miscellaneous gear ===
In addition to the equipment listed above, other pieces of essential gear include the ten essentials, a helmet and goggles, gloves, extra layers for variable weather conditions that can be life-threatening in the backcountry, an ice axe for steeper mountaineering-style tours, ski crampons for steep and icy ascents that skins fail on, a Voile ski strap, duct tape (which can be used for a variety of reasons including gear failures and emergency first aid), and a pack large and comfortable enough to carry all the equipment.

=== Avalanche education ===
Education in how to safely travel in avalanche terrain and how to rescue ski partners in the event of an avalanche or other emergency is widely considered a vital piece of gear. The type and quality of equipment is of limited relevance in the backcountry without knowledge of how to effectively use it. Most regions with popular backcountry skiing areas have training organizations that run courses on how to mitigate avalanche risk in the backcountry. In the United States, the American Institute for Avalanche Research and Education runs avalanche safety courses through a network of over 100 providers in 13 states. In Canada, Avalanche Canada provides similar safety courses.

== Safety ==
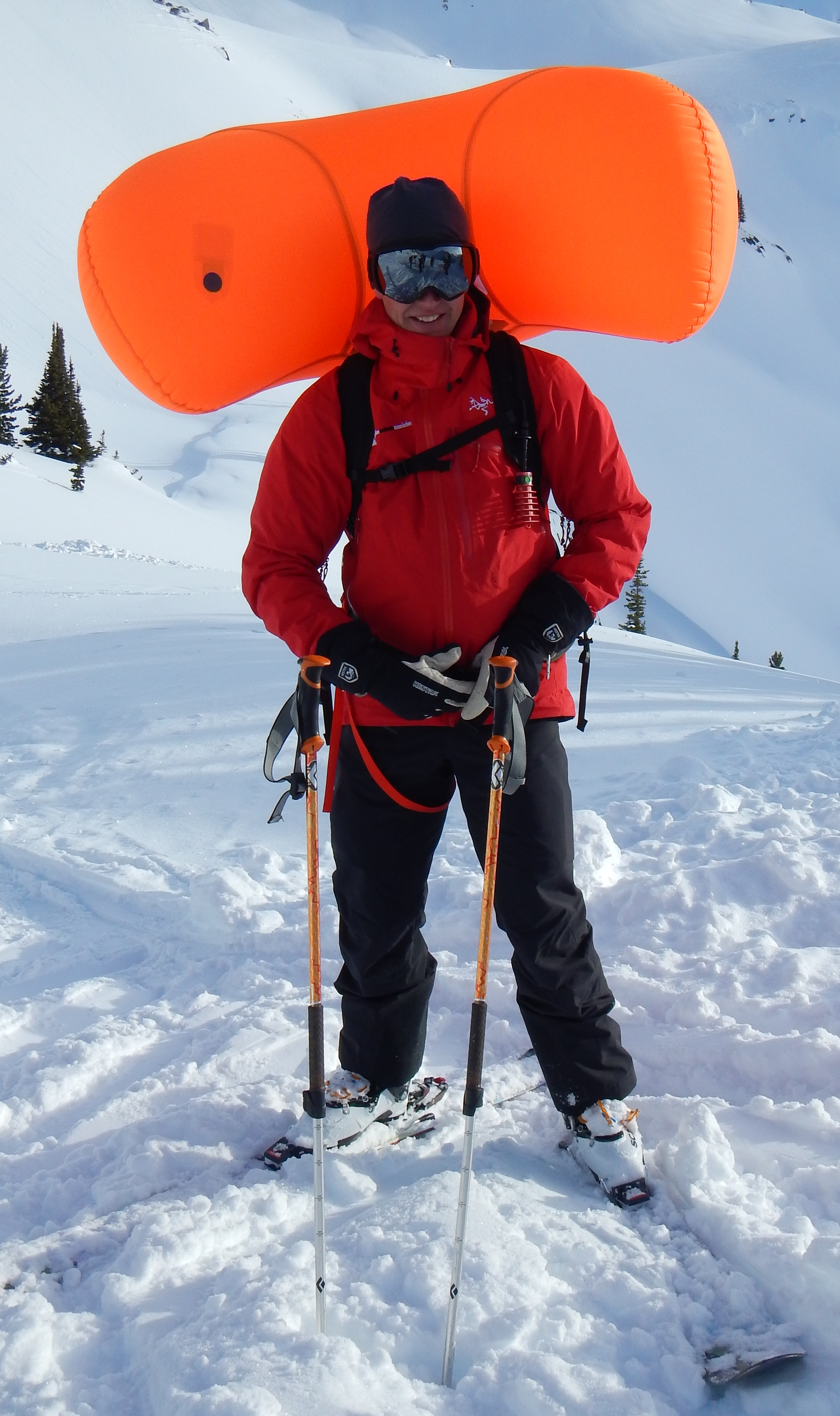
A deployed airbag.

Backcountry and off-piste skiing can be hazardous due to avalanches, exhaustion, weather, cliffs, rock falls, and tree wells, as well as the remote and isolated location of many of the best backcountry skiing spots. Avalanches result in about one fatality per month in the United States. Many backcountry skiers carry avalanche transceivers, shovels, and probes to perform avalanche rescues. In recent years training courses on how to use these tools and how to assess the risk of avalanches have become commonplace in North America.

In Europe and Canada off-piste skiing is generally permitted at ski resorts. In the United States off-piste skiing may or may not be; regulations vary by ski area. Many ski resorts prohibit it outright and some simply post warning signs that skiers are leaving the patrolled ski area boundaries.

== See also ==
- Haute Route
- Avalanche rescue
- Ski mountaineering
- Alpine skiing
- Slalom skiing
