= Northern Escape Heli-skiing =

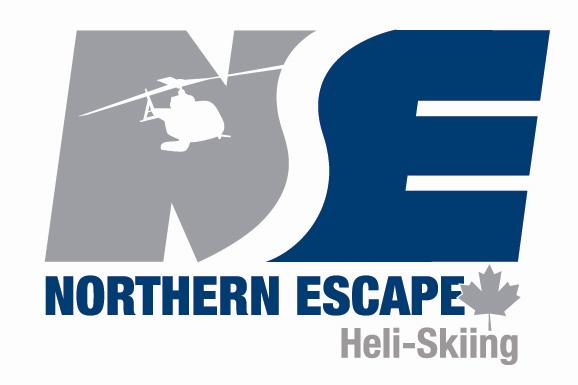
Northern Escape Heli-skiing Logo

Northern Escape Heli-skiing is a heliskiing company that was founded in 2004. They are located in Northern British Columbia's Skeena Mountains and centered in the town of Terrace. They have had several film crews, such as Matchstick Productions and Standard Films, ski/board and film on their terrain. Northern Escape has also appeared in publications such as Skier, Transworld Snowboarding, and Powder.

Northern Escape is locally owned and operated. Its operation mainly focuses on providing a more intimate vacation than other heliski companies. They operate out of two main lodges during the months of January to April.

== Location ==
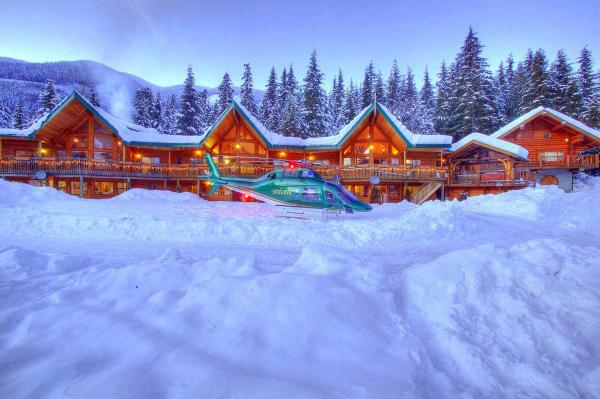
Yellow Cedar Lodge

Both of the lodges that Northern Escape uses are located within a 30 minute drive of the Terrace Regional Airport.

=== Yellow Cedar Lodge ===
The Yellow Cedar Lodge was built by hand with Cedar cut from the property on which it sits. The lodge overlooks the Skeena River and sits at the base of the Skeena Mountains.

The lodge can sleep up to 18 people and has an open dining room, open lounge, a sauna, hot tub, game room, weight room and cardio workout room.

=== Pioneer Lodge ===
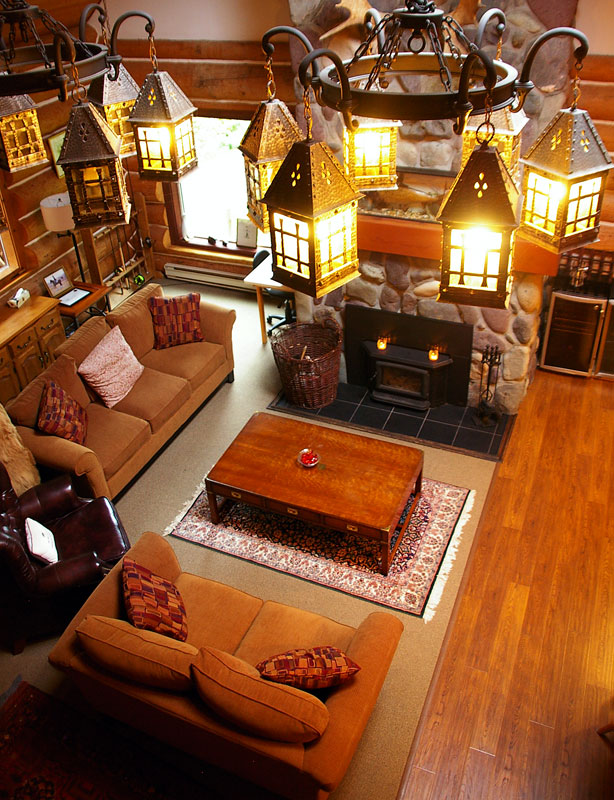
Pioneer Lodge

The Pioneer Lodge is located 800 meters up the road from Yellow Cedar Lodge. Northern Escape Heli-Skiing introduced this lodge into their program in their 2013/2014 skiing season and uses it exclusively for their "Elite" program.

The lodge can sleep up to 10 people and has an open dining room, hot tub, massage therapist, satellite TV, and wireless internet.

== Terrain ==
Northern Escape’s terrain is over 1.8 million acres (7000 km^{2}/2700 sq miles). This terrain is equivalent to two-thirds the size of Vancouver Island. Within this terrain, they have established over 250 runs. The runs are at elevations between 450 and 2,450 meters (1,480 and 8,040 ft).

== Weather patterns ==
During an average season, the Skeena Mountains receive between 30 and 40 meters (98 and 131 ft) of total snowfall, providing an average base of over 10 meters (33 feet) in the alpine. Weather information provided by Environment Canada from the Terrace Regional Airport located at 225 meters above sea level (asl) (750 feet asl). Skiing elevations are generally between 900 and 2,400 meters asl (3,000 and 8,000 feet asl) and therefore the conditions in the Skeena Mountain ranges may be significantly different. In 2000, Terrace received more than 113 centimeters of snow fall in a single day. That was just 5 centimeters short of the Canadian record.

== Cat Skiing backup ==
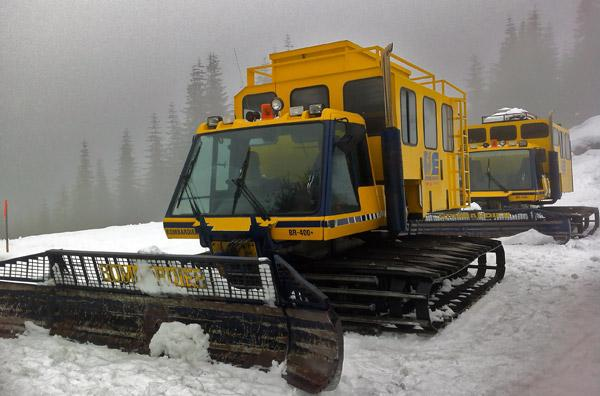
Snowcats to Help Prevent Down Days at Northern Escape Heli-Skiing

Northern Escape provides Snowcat back up to their helicopter operations. Cat skiing, in addition to heli skiing, ensures that the guests can ski when the weather is bad enough that the helicopters can not fly. The cat skiing terrain encompasses over 7,000 acres. Run lengths average over 1,800 feet with runs up to 2,600 feet.

This back up program was initially introduced in 2009 with two Snowcats. In 2014, they added a third Snowcat to their fleet.

== Safety ==
Any intermediate skier/boarder, provided they are in good physical condition and can confidently ski/board a Black Diamond run at a ski resort, can learn the basics of deep powder skiing. One of Northern Escape's main priorities is to provide safe vacations. They are a member of Heli Cat Canada which sets and maintains the operating and safety standards for the Heli skiing and Cat skiing industry in Canada. They have safety equipment including the Snowpulse Avalanche Airbag System, and also have the "RECCO" system. This system consists of a device that sends out a search signal, which is echoed back to the device by reflectors that are on clothing, boots and equipment.
