= AST =

AST, Ast, or ast may refer to:

== Education ==
- AST (exam) (Aptitude Scholastic Test), a standardized university entrance examination
- ACT Scaling Test, for year 12 students, Australia
- Advanced Skills Teacher, a teaching role in England and Wales
- Air Service Training, a flight engineering training school
- American School in Taichung, an international school in Taichung, Taiwan
- American School of Tangier
- American School of Tegucigalpa
- Atlantic School of Theology, Halifax, Nova Scotia, Canada
- Avalanche Skills Training, Canada
- Conroe ISD Academy of Science and Technology, Texas, US

== Science and technology ==
- Attention schema theory, of consciousness or subjective awareness

=== Computing ===
- Abstract syntax tree, a finite, labeled, directed tree used in computer science
- Anamorphic stretch transform, a physics-inspired signal transform
- Andrew S. Tanenbaum (born 1944), American-Dutch computer scientist, sometimes identified as "ast"
- Asynchronous system trap, a mechanism used in several computer operating systems
- Application security testing, testing the operation and security of a software application
- Application support team, a team of application support analysts supporting IT services delivered to users within an organisation, enabling the required operational processes needed for the business to be successful.

=== Medicine ===
- Aspartate transaminase, an enzyme associated with liver parenchymal cells
- Antibiotic sensitivity testing or antibiotic susceptibility testing, the measurement of the susceptibility of bacteria to antibiotics

=== Mathematics ===
- Alternative set theory
- Alternating series test

== Organizations ==
- Allied Security Trust, a patent holding company
- AST Research, a defunct personal computer manufacturer
- Association for Software Testing, US
- AST (publisher), a Russian book publishing company
- Arsenal Supporters' Trust, English football club supporters
- Augstsprieguma tīkls, independent electricity transmission state system operator in Latvia

=== Politics and government ===
- Abwehrstelle or Ast, the local intelligence center in each military district in Nazi Germany
- Alaska State Troopers, state police agency in Alaska, US
- Chadian Social Action (French: Action Sociale Tchadienne), a former political party in Chad
- Office of Commercial Space Transportation, of the US FAA
- Asturians, as used by ast.wikipedia.org

== Transport ==
- Aldershot GO Station, Amtrak station code AST
- Astoria Regional Airport (FAA Identifier and IATA code AST), Clatsop County, Oregon, US
- Aston railway station (National Rail code), Birmingham, England

== Time zones ==
- Atlantic Standard Time, UTC−4
- Alaska Standard Time, UTC−9
- Arabia Standard Time, UTC+3
- Antigua and Barbuda Time, UTC−4

== Other uses ==
- Aviation Survival Technician, a US Coast Guard rating
- AST Research, Inc., as known as AST Computer, a personal computer manufacturer
- Asti, Italian province and city (was traditionally Ast in the Piemontese dialect)
- Assured shorthold tenancy, UK
- Asturian language (ISO 639 alpha-3: ast), Spain
- Astana Pro Team (UCI code AST), a professional road bicycle racing team
- Georg Anton Friedrich Ast, German philosopher and philologist (1778–1841)
- Pat Ast, American actress and model (1941-2001)
- AST SpaceMobile, American satellite manufacturer
