= Avalanche Skills Training =

Avalanche Skills Training is a standardized form of avalanche training in Canada. Although Avalanche Skills Training (AST) is typically learned by backcountry skiers and snowboarders, it is commonly recommended for all people who want to explore the backcountry by snowmobiling, snowshoeing, hiking, and all other backcountry activities. The training is provided in two levels: AST 1 and AST 2. AST 1 includes basic snow study and training on the use of a transceiver, probe and shovel in companion rescue. AST 1 is taught in two parts: a classroom session including lectures, PowerPoints, videos, demonstrations, and group exercises, along with a field session which includes various practices while on the mountain. To move on to AST 2, it is required to complete the AST 1 course. AST 2 concentrates on advanced snow study. AST 2 is taught through multiple days, typically including one day in a classroom setting for theory and discussions, along with multiple days of advanced training on the mountain. Further training instruct the use of explosives for avalanche control. AST is supported by the Canadian Avalanche Association and the Alpine Club of Canada. AST is offered by various companies which are usually offered in the backcountry of Canada due to the length of their season of snow and cold weather, making it an exceptional location to conduct avalanche skills training. There have been 37 deaths in the United States recorded from avalanche accidents in 2021 alone. The information learned through the avalanche skills training courses is to prepare for identifying potential hazards in the back-country, understanding the hazards communicated through an avalanche forecast, identifying and managing your risk, recognizing avalanche terrain, planning trips that avoid or minimize exposure to avalanche terrain, and rescuing your partners if they are caught in an avalanche.

== See also ==
- Avalanche
