= ASTV =

ASTV may refer to:

- As seen on TV, marketing for products sold on television
  - AS Seen ON TV Inc. (stock ticker: ASTV), see as seen on TV
- MYtv (formerly Afrikaanse Satellietelevisie) Afrikaans-language South African TV channel
- ASTV (Thailand), Thai TV station

== See also ==
- STV (disambiguation)
- AST (disambiguation)
- ST (disambiguation)
- AS (disambiguation)
- TV (disambiguation)
