= Avalanche rescue =

Rescue of people buried in avalanches

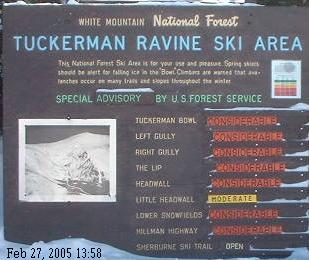
United States Forest Service avalanche danger advisories

Avalanche rescue involves locating and retrieving people who have been buried in avalanches.

== Prevention ==
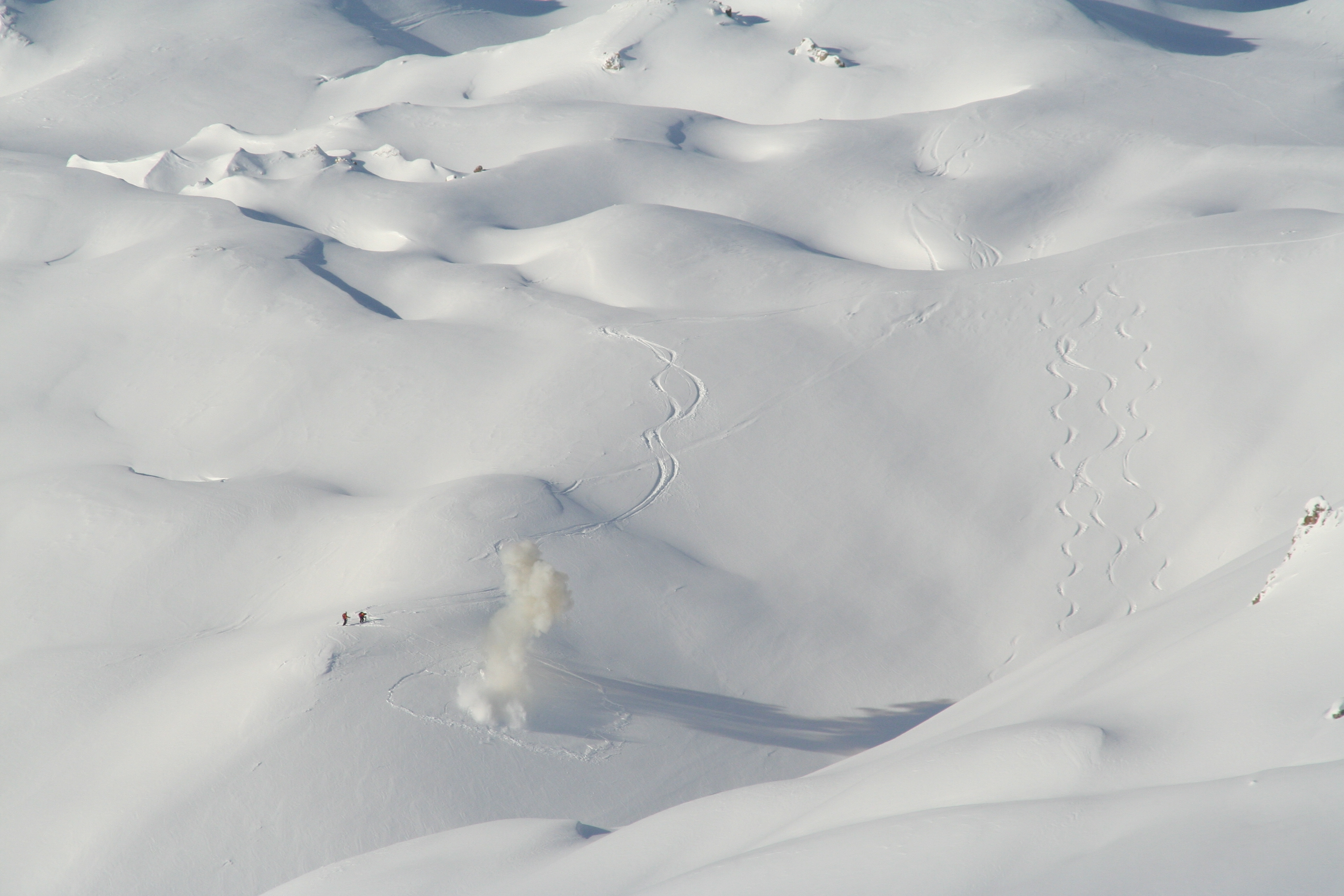
Avalanche blasting in French ski resort Tignes (3,600 m) Snow fences in Switzerland

There are several ways to prevent avalanches and lessen their power and destruction. They are employed in areas where avalanches pose a significant threat to people, such as ski resorts and mountain towns, roads and railways. Explosives are used extensively to prevent avalanches, especially at ski resorts where other methods are often impractical. Explosive charges are used to trigger small avalanches before enough snow can build up to cause a large avalanche. Snow fences and light walls can be used to direct the placement of snow. Snow builds up around the fence, especially the side that faces the prevailing winds. Downwind of the fence, snow buildup is lessened. This is caused by the loss of snow at the fence that would have been deposited and the pickup of the snow that is already there by the wind, which was depleted of snow at the fence. When there is a sufficient density of trees, they can greatly reduce the strength of avalanches. They hold snow in place and when there is an avalanche, the impact of the snow against the trees slows it down. Trees can either be planted or they can be conserved, such as in the building of a ski resort, to reduce the strength of avalanches.

Artificial barriers can be very effective in reducing avalanche damage. There are several types. One kind of barrier (snow net) uses a net strung between poles that are anchored by guy wires in addition to their foundations. These barriers are similar to those used for rockslides. Another type of barrier is a rigid fence like structure (snow fence) and may be constructed of steel, wood or pre-stressed concrete. They usually have gaps between the beams and are built perpendicular to the slope, with reinforcing beams on the downhill side. Rigid barriers are often considered unsightly, especially when many rows must be built. They are also expensive and vulnerable to damage from falling rocks in the warmer months. Finally, there are barriers that stop or deflect avalanches with their weight and strength. These barriers are made of concrete, rocks or earth. They are usually placed right above the structure, road or railway that they are trying to protect, although they can also be used to channel avalanches into other barriers. Occasionally, earth mounds are placed in the avalanche's path to slow it down.

== Safety in avalanche terrain ==
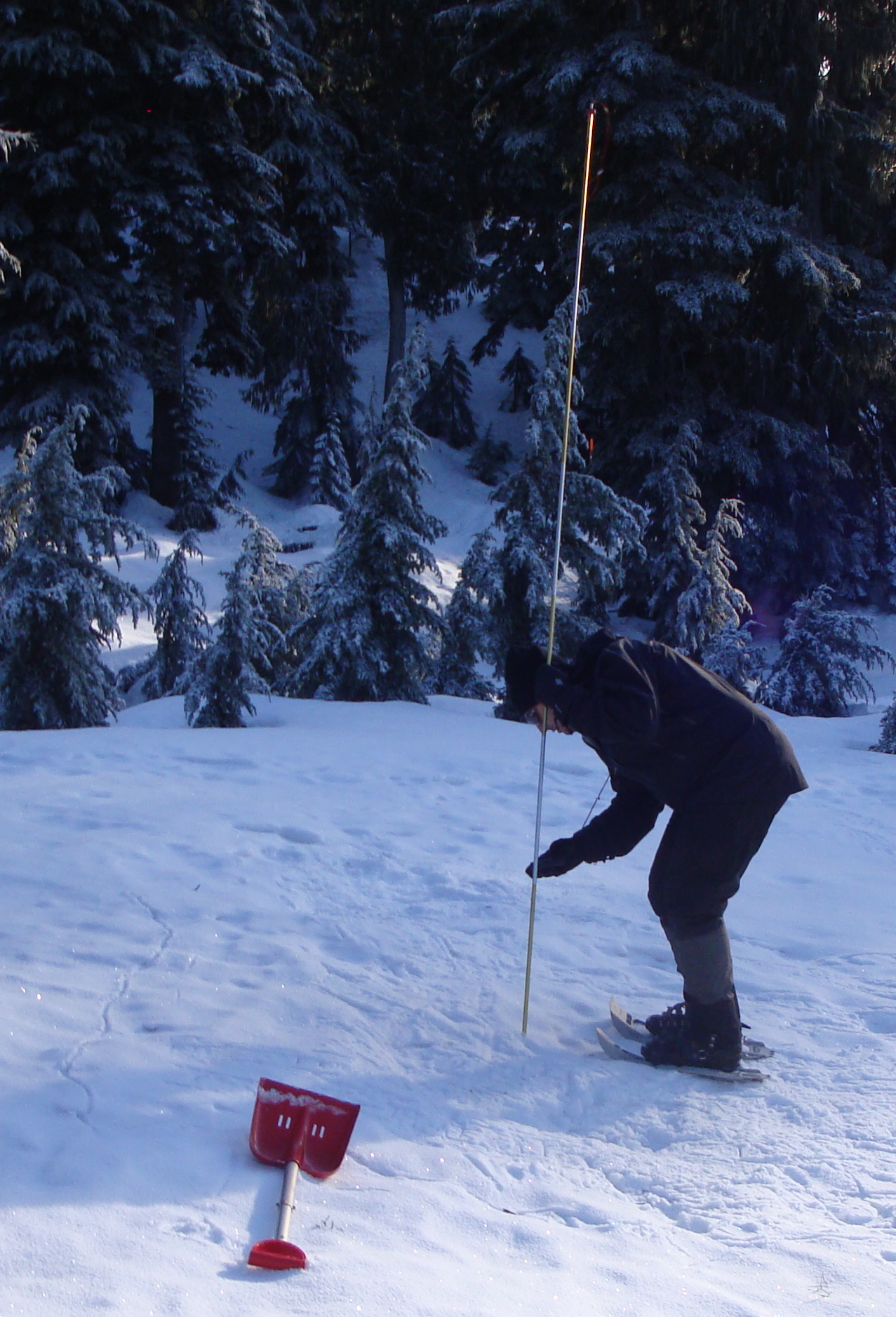
To quickly find and rescue a person buried in an avalanche, a probe, beacon, and shovel are essential. The buried person must also be wearing an avalanche beacon.

Even small avalanches are a serious danger to life, even with properly trained and equipped companions who avoid the avalanche. Between 55 and 65 percent of victims buried in the open are killed, and only 80 percent of the victims remaining on the surface survive. (McClung, p.177).

Research carried out in Switzerland based on 422 buried skiers indicates how the chances of survival drop:

- Very rapidly from 92 percent within 15 minutes to only 30 percent after 35 minutes (victims die of suffocation)
- Near zero after two hours (victims die of injuries or hypothermia)

(Historically, the chances of survival were estimated at 85% within 15 minutes, 50% within 30 minutes, 20% within one hour).

Consequently, it is vital that everyone surviving an avalanche is used in an immediate search and rescue operation, rather than waiting for help to arrive. Additional help can be called once it can be determined if anyone is seriously injured or still remains unaccounted for after the immediate search (i.e., after at least 30 minutes of searching). Even in a well equipped country such as France, it typically takes 45 minutes for a helicopter rescue team to arrive, by which time most of the victims are likely to have died.

In some cases avalanche victims are not located until spring thaw melts the snow, or even years later when objects emerge from a glacier.

== Search and rescue equipment ==
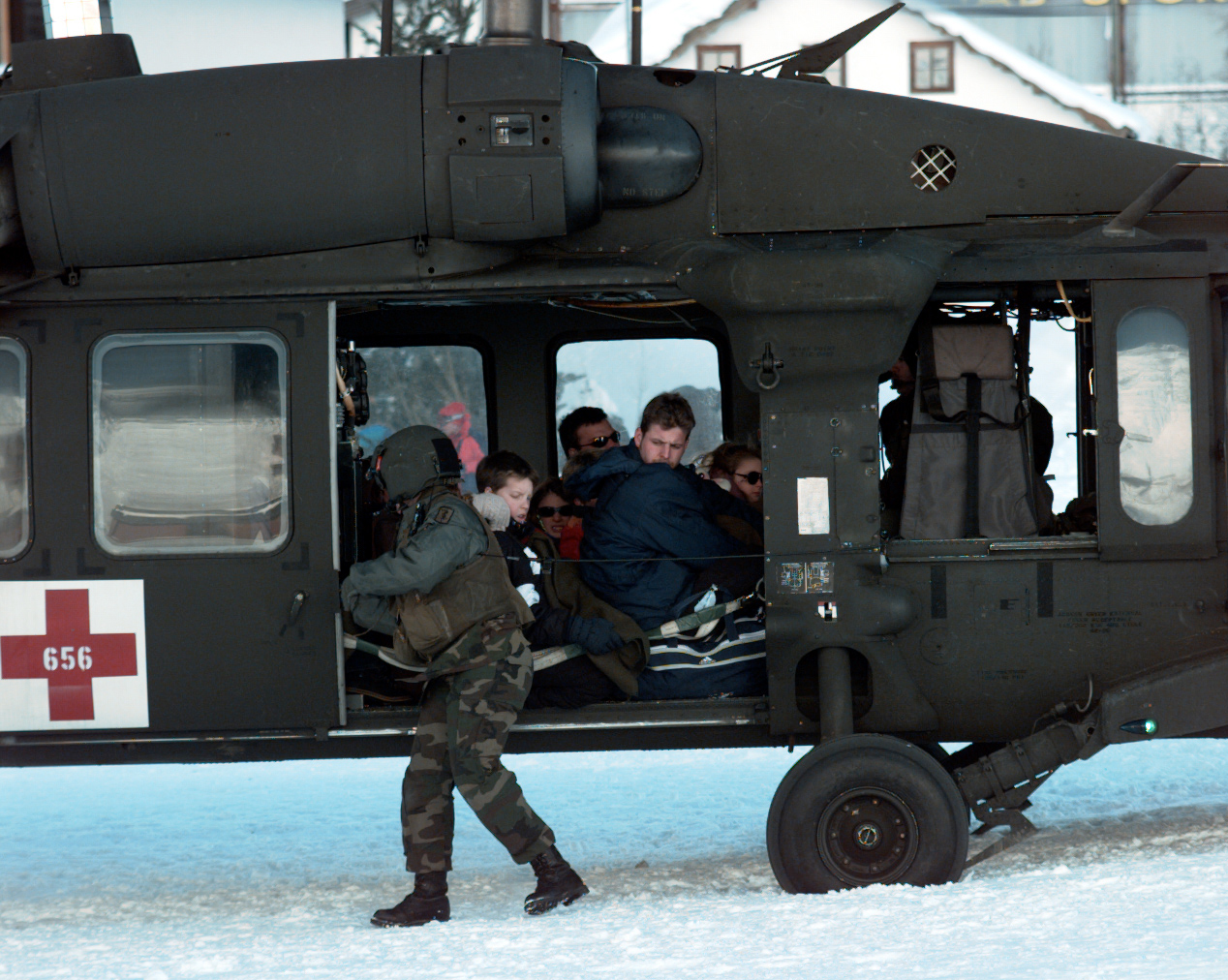
A Blackhawk helicopter as the crew prepares to evacuate tourists stranded by an avalanche in Galtür, Austria, on February 25, 1999.

Chances of a buried victim being found alive and rescued are increased when everyone in a group is carrying and using standard avalanche equipment, and have trained in how to use it. A beacon, shovel and probe is considered the minimum equipment to carry for companion rescue. Organized rescue involves ski patrols and mountain rescue teams who are often equipped with other technologies to search for buried victims. Rescue equipment can make a difference, and in 2010 the French National Association for the Study of Snow and Avalanches (ANENA) recommended that all off-piste skiers should carry beacons, probes, shovels, and Recco reflectors.

=== Avalanche cords ===
The use of avalanche cords goes back to the early 20th century and a Bavarian mountaineer named Eugen Oertel. In the United States the concept was recommended as early as 1908 in the Colorado newspaper - the Ouray Herald (November 13) - when the editor repeated the suggestion that miners in the San Juan Mountains adopt "snowslide ribbons" to safeguard their travels to and from the mines. The principle is simple. An approximately 15 metre long red cord (similar to parachute cord) is attached to the belt of the person to be protected. While they are skiing, snowboarding, or walking, the cord is dragged along behind them. The intent is, that if the person gets buried in an avalanche, the light cord stays on top of the snow. Due to the colour the cord would be easily visible for companions. Commercial avalanche cords have metal markings every one to three metres indicating the direction and length to the victim.

Avalanche cords were popular before beacons became available, and while cords were thought to be effective markers there was never any proof of their effectiveness. In the 1970s Melchior Schild of the Swiss Federal Institute for Snow and Avalanche Research (SLF) reviewed 30 years of Swiss avalanche accidents and rescues from 1944/45 to 1973/74. Of the 2042 avalanche victims he found only seven cases where avalanche cords were used (not including the 2 mentioned above). In five cases part of the cord was visible on the surface but so too was part of a victim. In the sixth case the victim was completely buried, but part of the cord was visible; this victim died of trauma. In the seventh case the completely buried avalanche cord was located by an avalanche rescue dog, however, the cord had become detached from the victim, and her body was found much later. In Knox Williams' and Betsy Armstrong's 1986 ‘’The Avalanche Book’’, they cite an early 1970s study, in which avalanche cords were tested on sandbag dummies. The dummies were placed onto steep slopes where explosives were used to trigger avalanches. Trials showed a portion of the cord remained on the surface only 40% of the time. The other 60% of the time the cord was completely buried along with the dummy. Typically the cord had spooled around the dummy. In 1975, at a symposium of avalanche rescue experts hosted by the International Foundation Vanni Eigenmann, Schild concluded, “On the basis of these results the avalanche cord can no longer be considered reliable.”

In the United States there have been two accidents with five buried victims, all wearing avalanche cords. In one accident, an avalanche cord remained on the surface. In the second accident five ski mountaineers with cords deployed triggered an avalanche. One skier was partly buried, but his four friends and cords were completely buried. Moderate snow and the loss of the survivor's eyeglasses only worsened the situation. The search was called off a few days later. The four were eventually found many months later after their bodies with attached cords melted out of the snow. On one victim the cord was wrapped tightly around the body.

Avalanche cords are now regarded obsolete, as beacons are available and much more effective.

=== Beacons ===
Avalanche Transceivers — known as beacons, "beepers", peeps (pieps), ARVAs (Appareil de Recherche de Victimes en Avalanche, in French), LVS (Lawinen-Verschütteten-Suchgerät, Swiss German), or various other trade names, are important for every member of the party. They emit a "beep" via 457 kHz radio signal in normal use, but may be switched to receive mode to locate a buried victim up to 80 meters away. Analog receivers provide audible beeps that rescuers interpret to estimate distance to a victim. To use the receiver effectively requires regular practice. Some older models of beepers operated on a different frequency (2.275 kHz ) and a group leader should ensure these are no longer in use.

Since about 2000 nearly all avalanche rescue transceivers use digital displays to give visual indications of direction and distance to victims. Most users find these beacons easier to use, but to be effective still requires considerable practice by the user. Beacons are the primary rescue tool for companion rescue and are considered active devices because the user must learn to use and care for their device.

Avalanche transceivers are not to be confused with several smartphone applications calling themselves smartphone avalanche search apps using two-way communication technologies. Every member of the party must be equipped with an avalanche transceiver.

=== Probes ===
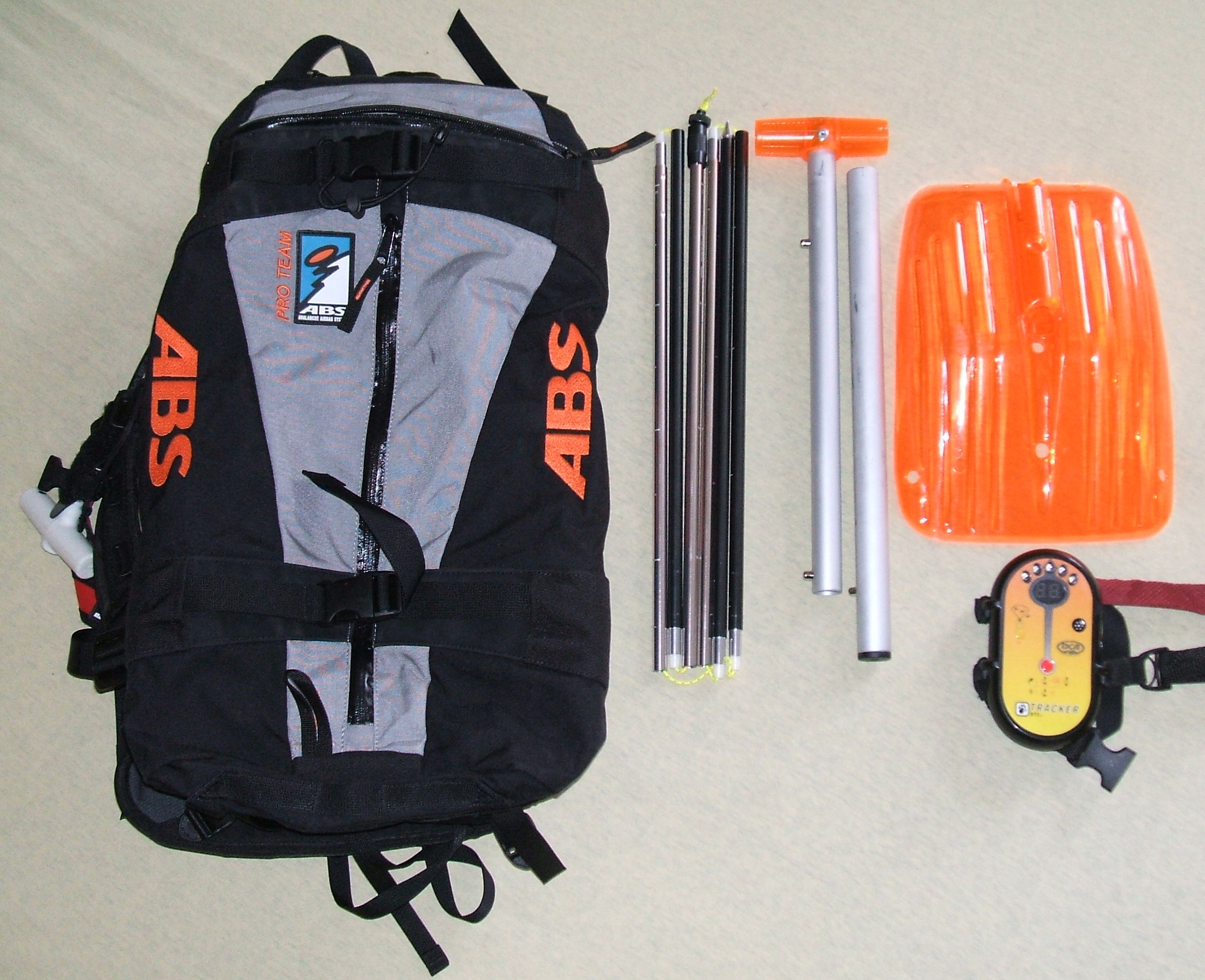
Avalanche security, search and rescue equipment (left to right): avalanche airbag system, probe (folded), shovel, avalanche transceiver

Portable (collapsible) probes can be extended to probe into the snow to locate the exact location of a victim at several yards / metres in depth. When multiple victims are buried, probes should be used to decide the order of rescue, with the shallowest being dug out first since they have the greatest chance of survival.

Probing can be a very time-consuming process if a thorough search is undertaken for a victim without a beacon. In the U.S., 86% of the 140 victims found (since 1950) by probing were already dead. Survival/rescue more than 2 m deep is rare (about 4%). Probes should be used immediately after a visual search for surface clues, in coordination with the beacon search.

=== Shovels ===
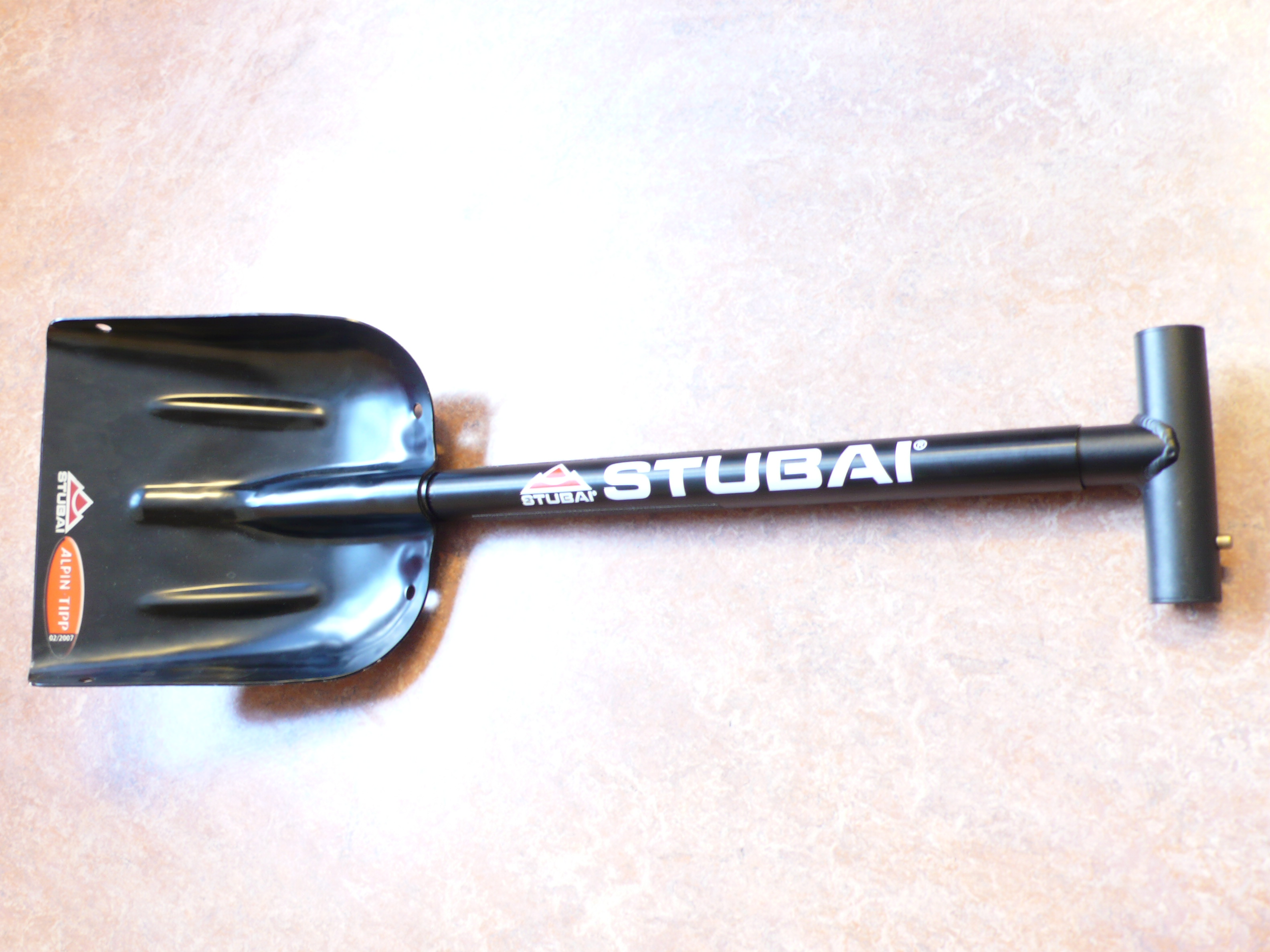
Avalanche shovel

Even when the snowpack consists of loose powder, avalanche debris is hard and dense. The energy of the avalanche causes the snow to melt, and the debris refreezes immediately after it stops.

Shovels are essential for digging through the snow to the victim, as the snow is often too dense to dig with hands or skis. A large strong scoop and sturdy handle are important. Plastic traditional snow shovels often break, whereas metal ones are less prone to failure.

As excavation of the avalanche victim is extremely time-consuming and many buried victims suffocate before they can be reached, shoveling technique is an essential element of rescue.

Shovels are also useful for digging snow pits as part of evaluating the snowpack for hidden hazards, such as weak layers supporting large loads.

=== Recco rescue system ===
The Recco system is used by organised rescue services around the world. The Recco system is a two-part system where the rescue team uses a small hand-held detector. The detector receives a directional signal that is reflected back from a small, passive, transponder called a reflector that is included into outerwear, boots, helmets, and body protection. Recco reflectors are not a substitute for avalanche beacons. The Recco signal does not interfere with beacons. In fact, the current Recco detector also has an avalanche beacon receiver (457 kHz) so one rescuer can search for a Recco signal and a beacon signal at the same time.

=== Avalung ===
Recently, a device called an Avalung has been introduced for use in avalanche terrain. The device consists of a mouth piece, a flap valve, an exhaust pipe, and an air collector. Several models of Avalung either mount on one's chest or integrate in a proprietary backpack.

During an avalanche burial, victims not killed by trauma usually suffer from asphyxiation as the snow around them melts from the heat of the victim's breath and then refreezes, disallowing oxygen flow to the victim and allowing toxic levels of CO_{2} to accumulate. The Avalung ameliorates this situation by drawing breath over a large surface area in front and pushing the warm exhaled carbon dioxide behind. This buys additional time for rescuers to dig the victim out.

=== Avalanche airbags ===
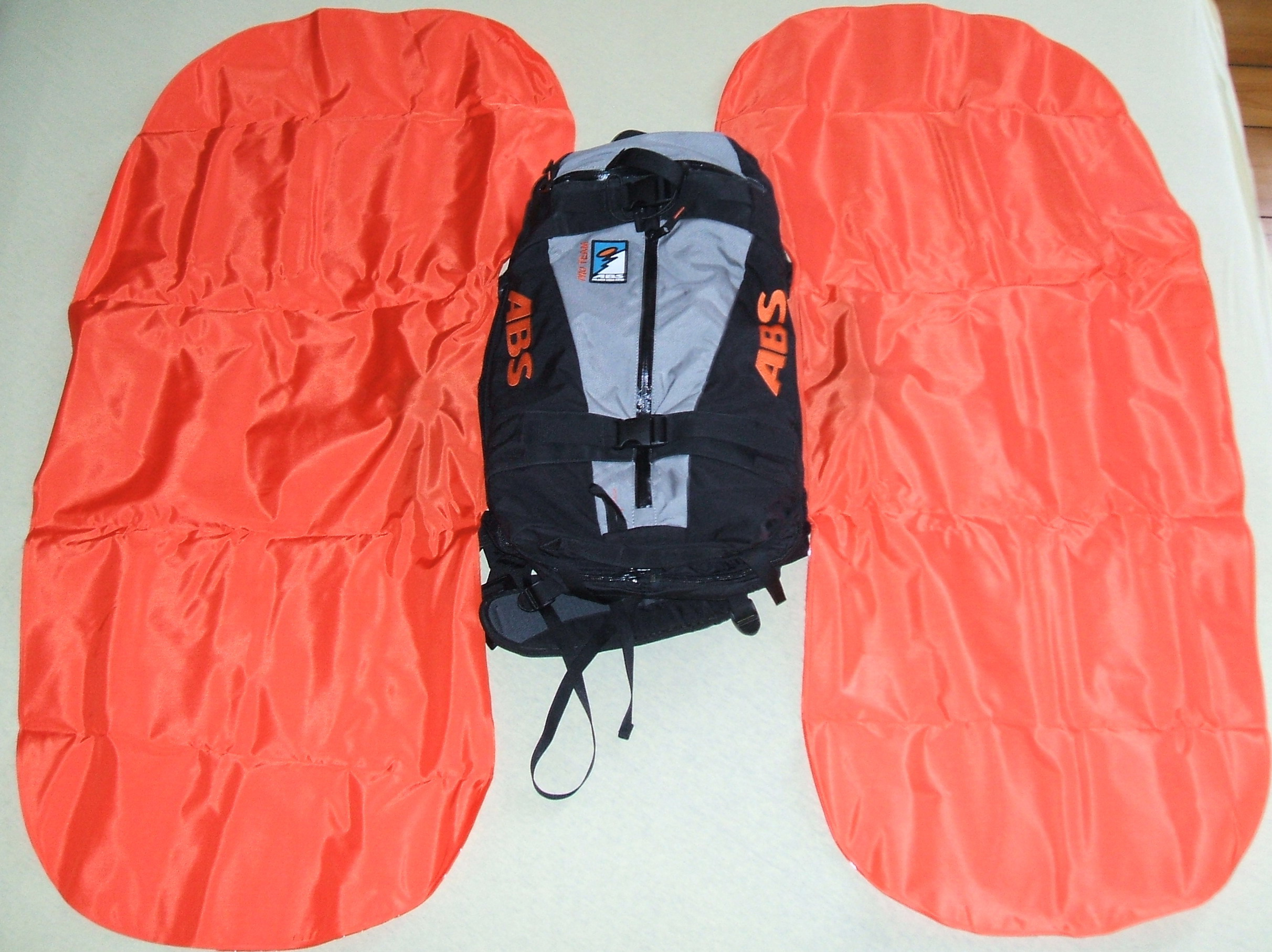
Avalanche airbag system with visible airbags

Avalanche airbags help a person avoid burial by making the user an even larger object relative to the moving snow, which forces the person toward the surface. Avalanche airbags work on the principle of inverse segregation (granular convection). Avalanches, like mixed nuts and breakfast cereal are considered granular materials and behave fluid-like (but are not liquids) where smaller particles settle to the bottom of the flow and larger particles rise to the top. Provided the airbag is properly deployed, the chances of a complete burial are significantly reduced.

With freeriding becoming more popular in recent years, avalanche airbags have become (relatively) commonly used equipment, with one German producer reporting over 20,000 sales in the 2012/13 winter season. One complication is that the small explosives or compressed air canisters that deploy the airbag might need to be emptied or expended in order to fly on a commercial airplane. Though the International Air Transport Association has approved carrying charged devices, the U.S. Transportation Security Administration requires that they be discharged. For this reason, some users who travel by air buy a new canister or refill an empty one after arrival.

In 2014, one company introduced an airbag system that uses a battery-powered fan to inflate its 200-litre (7.1 cu ft) bag in around 3.5 seconds. Avoiding the use of compressed gas is claimed to avoid problems with travel restrictions. The manufacturer claims a number of other advantages for the system, such as the ability to easily and repeatedly test it, the ability of a continuously operating fan to keep the airbag inflated even if it receives a puncture or small tear and the fact that the bag can be easily deflated and repacked, making the system available for a second deployment if needed.

=== Other devices ===
More backcountry adventurers are also carrying Satellite Electronic Notification Devices (SEND) to quickly alert rescuers to a problem. These devices include the SPOT Messenger, or Personal Locating Beacons (PLBs) containing the Global Positioning System (GPS). This device can quickly notify search and rescue of an emergency and the general location Survivors should also try to use a mobile phone to notify emergency personnel. Unlike the other devices mentioned above, the mobile phone (or satellite phone) provides two-way communications with rescuers.

On-site rescuers (usually companions) are in the best position to save a buried victim. However, organized rescue teams can sometimes respond very quickly to assist in the search for a buried victim. The sooner organized rescue can be notified the sooner they can respond, and this difference can mean the difference in living or dying for a critically injured patient. The International Commission for Alpine Rescue recommends, “early notification is essential, e.g., by mobile phone, satellite phone, or radio, wherever possible”

Other rescue devices are proposed, developed and used, such as avalanche balls, vests and airbags, based on statistics indicating that decreasing the depth of burial increases the chances of survival.

Although inefficient, some rescue equipment can be improvised by unprepared parties: ski poles can become short probes, skis or snowboards can be used as shovels. A first aid kit and equipment is useful for assisting survivors who may have cuts, broken bones, or other injuries, in addition to hypothermia.

== Types of rescue ==
Self-rescue is the process where victims caught in an avalanche escape by either digging themselves out, or after the snow melts. Self-rescue is rare as the victim is usually "entombed" by the snow and unable to move at all. However, if the avalanche is small, or the victim is buried near the surface, or the avalanche debris is soft, victims may be able to dig themselves out. When attempting to dig themselves out, victims usually find it difficult to gauge which way is up. A common myth is that spitting while covered in snow can help a victim determine the direction upwards. Spitting while covered in snow does not help because when the snow has settled, it becomes solid and movement is mostly not possible. In some cases, the snow may begin to melt, and the victim may be released from the snow after it thaws.

Companion rescue is when victims are rescued by other members of their group. When professional and volunteer rescue teams become involved, the process is referred to as organized rescue. In case of organized rescue, the first teams travel fast and light to locate and uncover buried victims. These teams carry basic rescue equipment, including rescue dogs and RECCO detectors, and emergency-care gear. These rescuers are generally not equipped for prolonged operations.

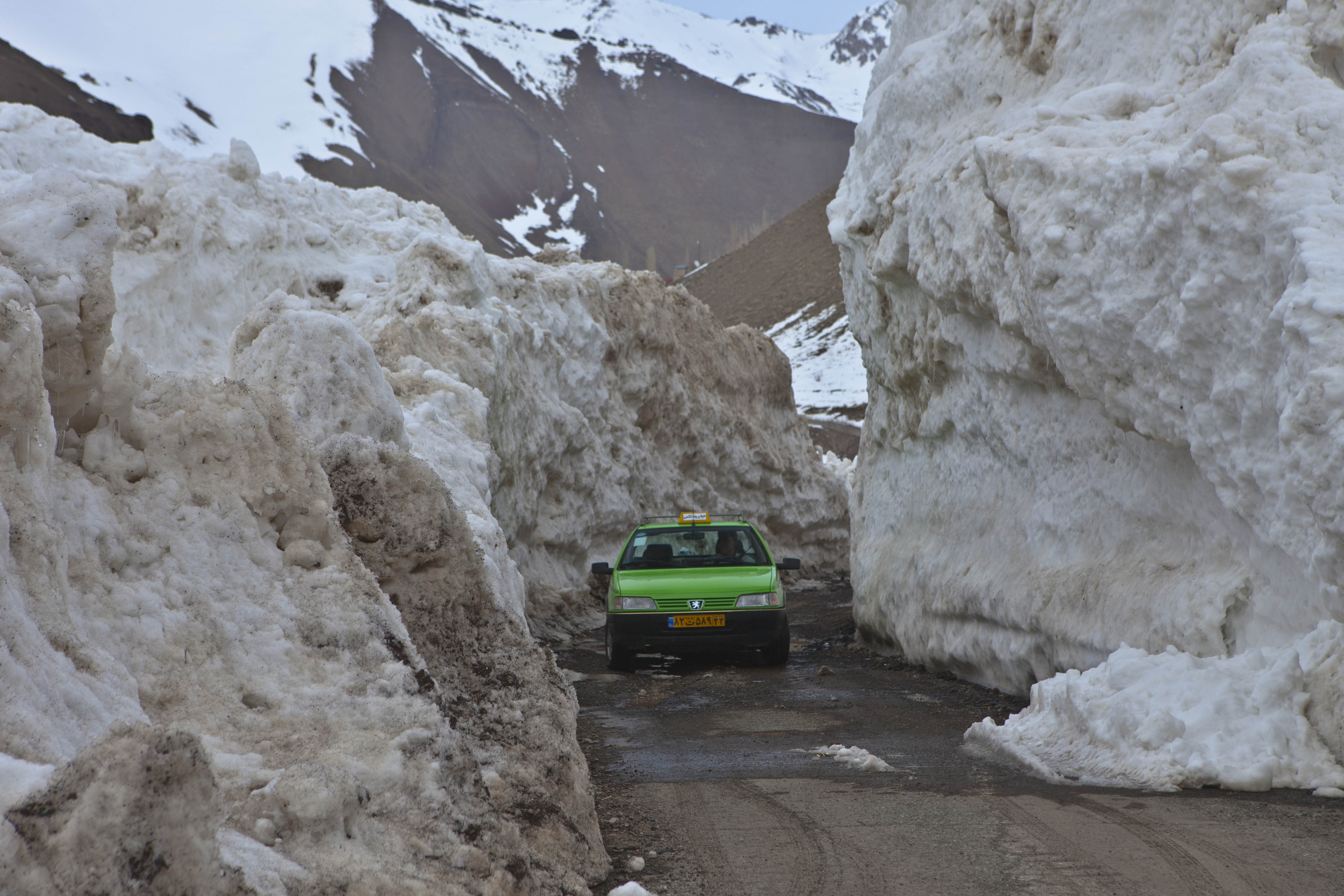
Avalanche in Karaj County, Alborz Province, Iran

Upon the first alert of an avalanche incident the rescue leader will appoint a team to arrange transportation for both rescuers and patients. Rescue leaders will assess the complexity of the search and rescue operation to determine and anticipate the needs for support. Every incident is different depending upon the number of victims, avalanche danger, weather conditions, terrain, access, availability of rescuers, etc. Support includes getting appropriate resources of people and equipment, transporting the resources, caring for and replacing rescuers.

In the United States all agencies are mandated to manage search and rescue operations, including avalanche, under the Incident Command System (ICS).

== See also ==
- Alpine climbing
- Climbing equipment
