= Canadian Avalanche Association =

Non-profit organization in Canada

The Canadian Avalanche Association (CAA) is a non-profit organization that supports avalanche practitioners in Canada by organizing professional training courses, providing a system for information exchange and ensures that members meet the highest practise standards to secure confidence in their avalanche safety programs. Being a member of the CAA requires knowledge of evolving avalanche-related sciences, specialized technical training, and extensive operational experience. CAA members serve the public by competently evaluating avalanche hazards and managing risks to protect people and property from avalanches. CAA members may work for ski resorts, industry and transportation (such as mining, highways or railway), or public avalanche safety organizations like Avalanche Canada; helicopter, cat or ski/snowboard guiding operations; as avalanche consultants, as instructors of professional or recreational avalanche courses, researchers and more.

The CAA's mission is to ensure that its diverse membership of avalanche practitioners meets the highest standards, and adheres to best practices to secure the confidence of governments, industry and Canadians. The CAA does this by:

- Protecting the public interest by ensuring members adhere to the CAA's Code of Ethics.
- Representing CAA members who are professionally engaged in avalanche work in Canada.
- Maintaining, monitoring and enforcing standards of education and qualifications for continued membership in the association.
- Facilitating the exchange of technical information between persons engaged in avalanche safety programs.
- Supporting public avalanche awareness by acting as a resource base.
- Encouraging and promoting avalanche safety research and development.
- Providing professional avalanche education.

The CAA's Industry Training Program (ITP) offers training and continuing professional development courses for persons employed or seeking employment in activities where they are required to identify and/or actively manage avalanche hazards. ITP is a private, post-secondary training institution registered pursuant to the Private Post-Secondary Education Act in British Columbia, and the Private Vocational Schools Act in Alberta. Recreational avalanche skills training courses are provided by CAA members who are certified by Avalanche Canada, an organization dedicated to public avalanche safety in Canada. The CAA is based in Revelstoke, British Columbia.

== History ==
The Canadian Avalanche Association was formed in 1981, after personnel from avalanche safety and control operators from Parks Canada, BC Highways, heli ski operations, ski areas, mines and researchers came together late in the 1970s to share experiences and ideas about avalanche mitigation.

From 2004 until 2011, the CAA shared an Executive Director and Board of Directors with the Canadian Avalanche Centre, now Avalanche Canada.
