= AST (exam) =

Standardized university entrance exam

Aptitude Scholastic Test (AST) is a standardized university entrance examination developed by experts from the Chinese-basedAmbright Institute of Educational Research and subject experts and professors from the University of Cambridge. It is generally held in August and December each year.

The AST is conducted in English and covers subjects including English, Mathematics, Physics, Chemistry, Biology, Economics, and Information Technology. The maximum score is 300 points. The purpose of the AST is to provide a standardized assessment tool for higher education institutions to evaluate the academic potential of applicants. Since its launch in 2008, it has become an evaluation standard for the admission of Chinese students by some universities in the United Kingdom, Singapore, New Zealand, and the United States.

At the same time, the examination also serves as a standard for Chinese universities when admitting international students. Since 2025, Fudan University, Zhejiang University, University of Science and Technology of China, and Nanjing University began accepting AST results as a criterion for admitting international students.
