= Nonlinear junction detector =

Electronic device

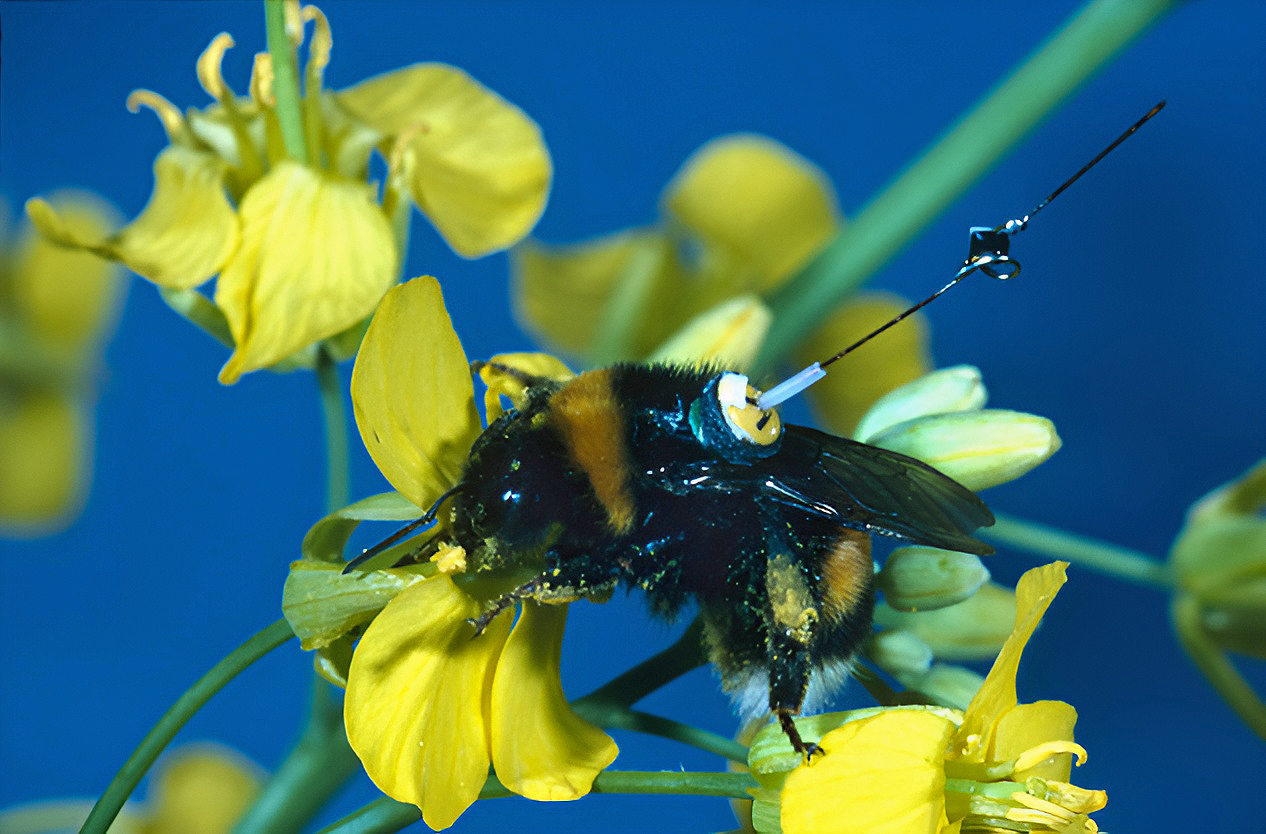
A bumblebee with a transponder acting as a non-linear junction for tracking the animal by way of harmonic radar.

The non-linear junction detector, or an NLJD, is a device that illuminates a small region of space with high-frequency RF energy. Any "non linear junction" in the vicinity—for example, and particularly, the p–n junction—will receive this energy, and because of the asymmetric response of the junction to an electric field, it will mangle it, re-emitting some of it on multiples of the illumination frequency (see harmonic). The detector has a sensitive receiver tuned to these harmonics, as well as appropriate processing and displays to make their presence known to the user of the device. Because the basis of almost all semiconductor electronics is the p-n junction, an NLJD is correspondingly capable of detecting almost any unshielded electronic device containing semiconductors, whether the electronics are actively powered or not.

In its basic form, an NLJD can also detect things that are not themselves electronic in nature, so the use of the device requires a modicum of skill and experience. For example, a rusty nail inside a wall can give a false positive. For this reason, most modern NLJDs examine the ratio between the second and the third harmonic of the illumination frequency. When a true (electronic) p-n junction is encountered, the second harmonic will generally be stronger than the third.

== History ==
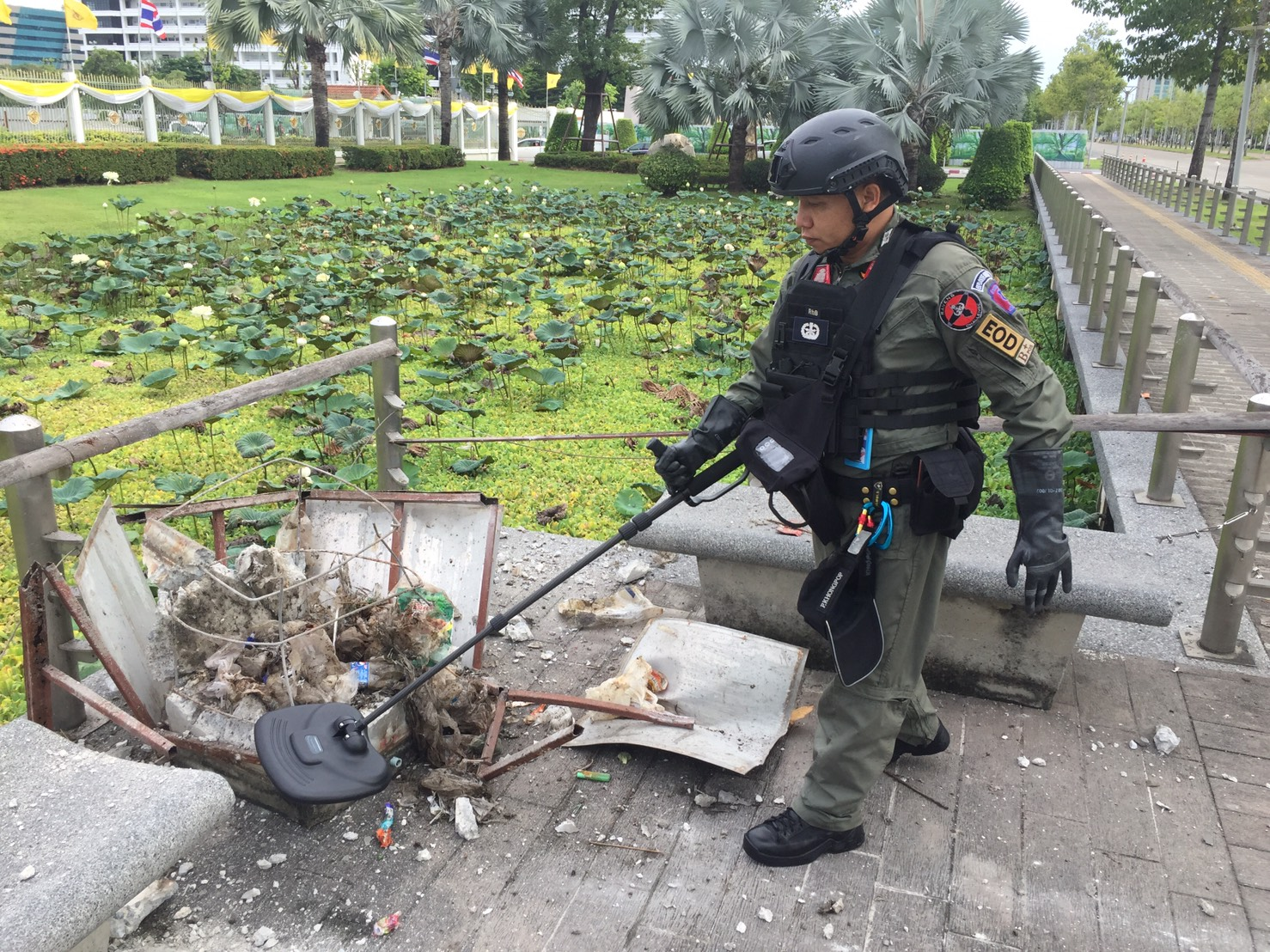
A Thai police officer uses a nonlinear junction detector (NLJD) to examine an exploded improvised explosive device (IED).

The NLJD was invented by Charles Bovill during WWII. It was initially used to discover corrosion below painted surfaces on airplanes. In 1972, shortly after Bovill had become technical director at Allen International Ltd. (Westminster, London, UK), the device was renamed 'Broom' and was introduced as a device for finding inactive covert listening devices (bugs). The Broom was later marketed by Audiotel in Corby (UK) as the Scanlock Broom, and was succeeded by the Scanlock Broom ECM and later the Scanlock Super Broom.

Similar devices are available from manufacturers in the US (e.g. Orion) and Russia.

== Countermeasures ==
As a countermeasure against an NLJD, professional covert listening devices (bugs) of the Central Intelligence Agency were equipped from 1968 onwards with a so-called isolator. An isolator is a 3-port circulator of which the return port is terminated with a resistor. Any energy injected into the bug by an NLJD will be absorbed by the resistor, resulting in no (or very little) reflected energy. An example of such a bug is the CIA's SRT-107.

A means to hinder isolating a non linear junction is to add inexpensive diodes to places where the NLJD is expected to sweep. This masks the true listening device against a field of false alerts when the many diodes are detected. Such a technique was used in the 1980s construction of the U.S. embassy in Moscow. Thousands of diodes were mixed by the Soviets into the building's structural concrete, making detection and removal of the true listening devices by its American occupants nearly impossible.

== See also ==
- Covert listening device
