= RECCO =

Rescue technology

RECCO AB
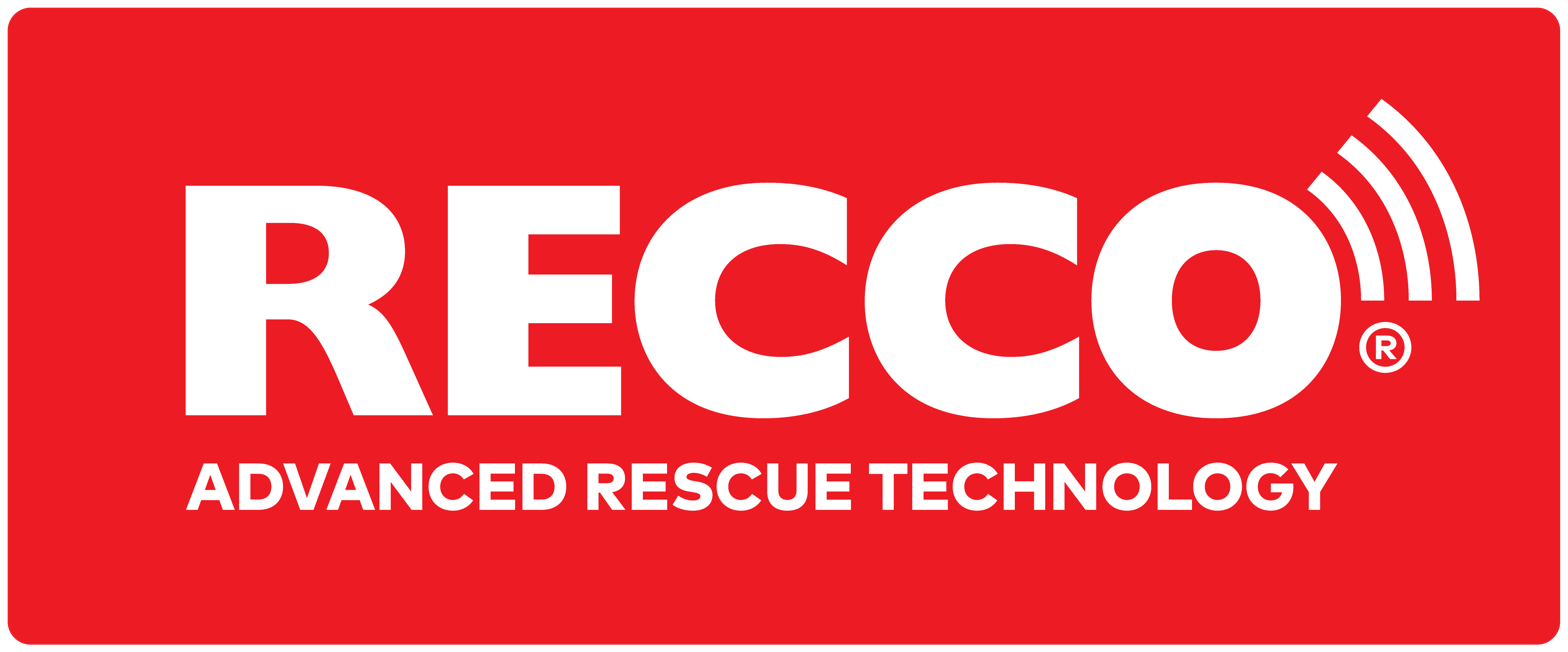
- Industry: Technology
- Founded: 1983
- Founder: Magnus Granhed
- Headquarters: Lidingö, Sweden
- Area served: Worldwide
- Key people: Fredrik Steinwall (CEO)
- Products: RECCO detectors and reflectors
- Website: recco.com

RECCO is a rescue technology used by organised rescue teams as an additional tool to more quickly locate people buried by an avalanche or lost in the outdoors. The system is based on a harmonic radar system and composed of a detector and a passive reflector integrated into outdoor clothing and gear.

== History ==
The RECCO rescue technology was developed by Magnus Granhed, in response to his personal experience with a fatal avalanche accident in Åre, Sweden, in 1973. Starting in the winter of 1978–1979, Granhed collaborated with Bengt Enander's team at the Department of Electromagnetic Theory, Royal Institute of Technology in Stockholm to develop an avalanche rescue system, using the principle of harmonic radar.

Granhed formed RECCO AB in 1983 and created the first functional prototype. In 1987, a woman was localised with the RECCO rescue technology from a helicopter in Lenzerheide, Switzerland, in the first live rescue found using the technology.

In 2015, RECCO introduced the RECCO SAR Helicopter detector that expands the technology to finding a missing person in other outdoor environments.

== The system ==
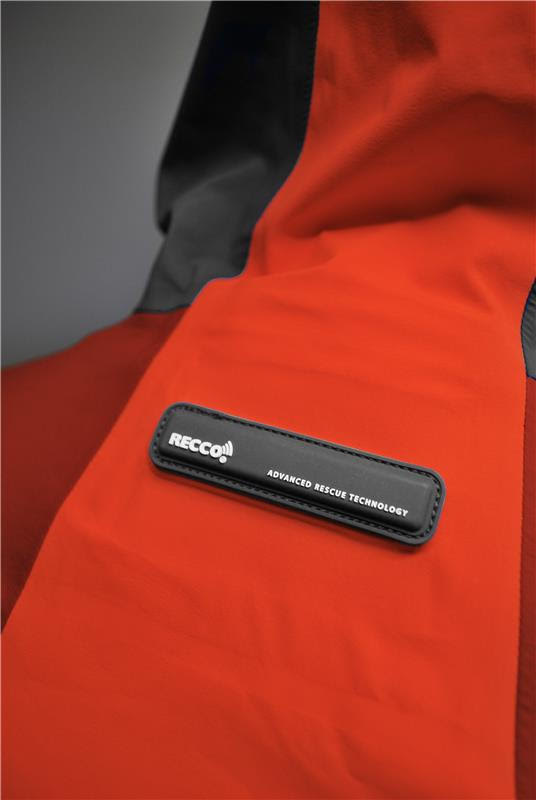
Integrated RECCO reflector on a jacket

Based on the harmonic radar system, the RECCO rescue technology consists of two parts: a passive and lightweight reflector and a portable detector. The reflector is worn by the person and directly integrated in the clothing or gears. The detector is used by professional rescue teams on avalanche site, by foot or from a helicopter.

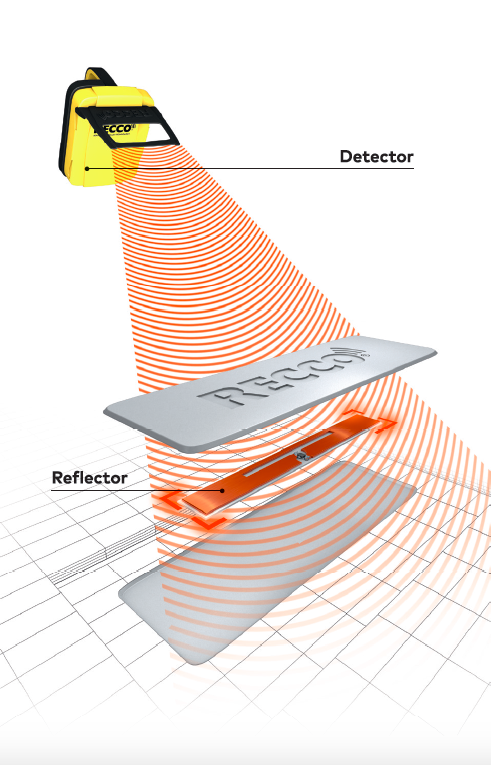

=== The reflector ===
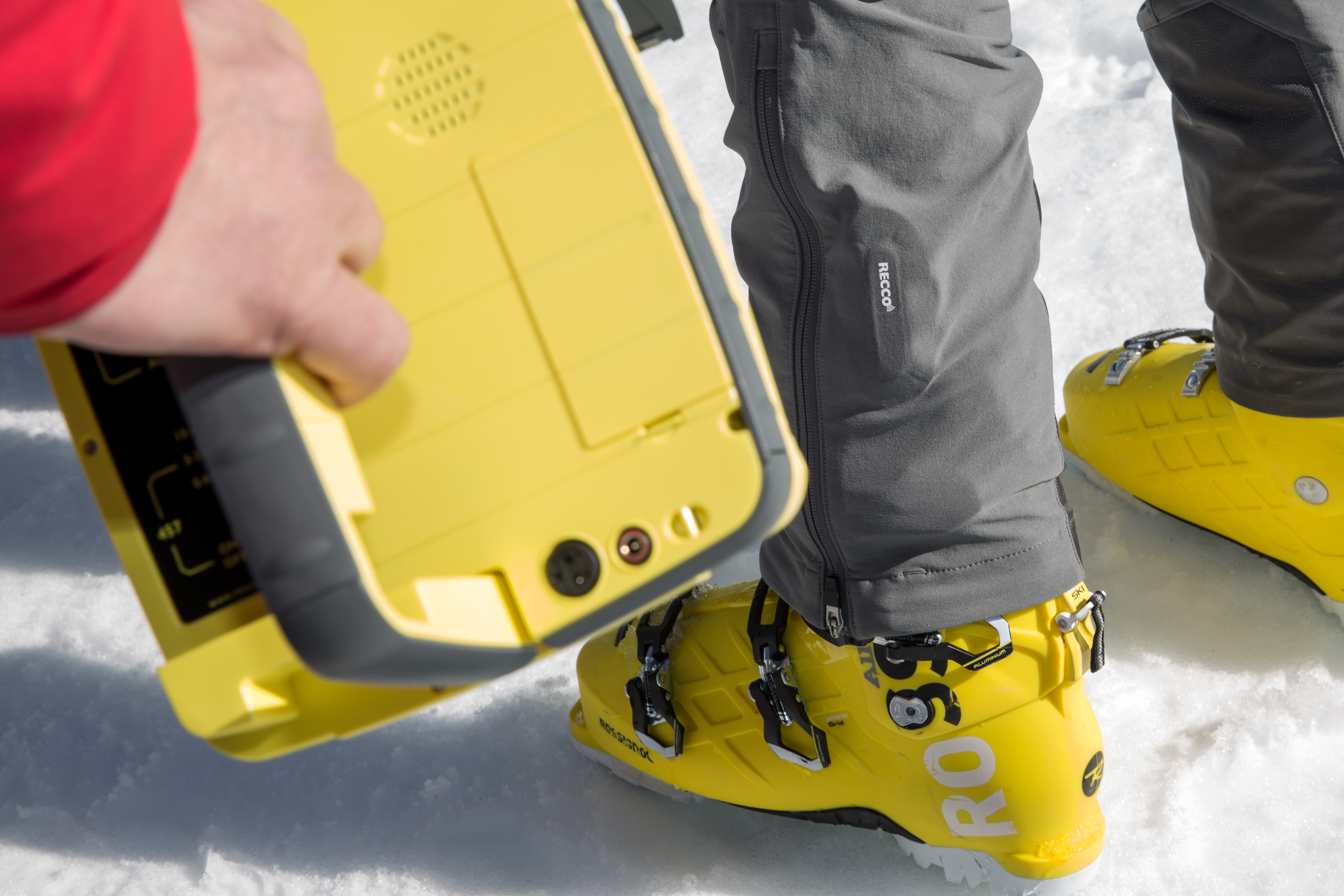
RECCO reflector integrated in the pants

The reflector is a passive transponder, which does not require batteries or activation, consisting of a diode and an antenna. Its dimensions are 13 mm × 51 mm × 1.5 mm and it weighs 4g. The company suggests that two reflectors in different locations are ideal.

More than 150 brands integrate RECCO reflectors into their outdoor gear, including ski boots, helmets, hiking shoes, jackets, pants and backpacks.

=== The handheld detector ===
The detector sends out a highly directional radar signal. If the signal hits a reflector it is echoed back to the detector. The returned signal is translated into an audio tone if the detector is pointed in the direction of a reflector. Judging from the audio tone a trained professional rescuer can determine the location of a buried victim. Due to the diode, the returned signal is doubled in frequency - harmonic radar.

The R9 detector, released in 2009, weighs 900 grams. During a search and rescue, its signal can locate RECCO reflectors within a range up to 80 meters through air and 20 meters through packed snow, depending on various factors such as the snow conditions and depth.

Short-range portable detectors are used, transmitting via a directional antenna at 866.9 MHz (Europe) or 902.85 MHz (US) and receiving at twice the frequency. The detector works by transmitting at one frequency on a 20% duty cycle and listening for a harmonic reflection at double the frequency.

RECCO radio frequencies
| Location | Transmit | Receive |
|---|---|---|
| Europe | 866.9 MHz | 1733.8 MHz |
| United States | 902.85 MHz | 1805.7 MHz |

The signal from the detector can also weakly be reflected from other electronic devices, such as cameras and cell phones, as well as metallic objects. However, even if this effect has allowed the rescue of several buried people who were not carrying a reflector, the search range of those others devices is much shorter and not reliable enough.

== Rescue applications ==
=== Avalanche rescue ===
More than 700 rescue groups worldwide, predominantly in ski resorts, used the technology. The professional rescue teams use RECCO detectors as an electronic search method in addition to the avalanche transceiver to find victims in an avalanche. RECCO equipment is included in textbooks on rescue, and a RECCO reflector is included among measures recommended by the International Commission for Alpine Rescue.

According to the company, people totally buried by an avalanche were located using the technology in fifteen incidents during 2005–15. A case report of a live rescue of a buried off-piste skier using RECCO equipment that occurred in Spain in 2015 has been published in the Journal of Wilderness and Environmental Medicine. The authors commented that the technology was poorly studied compared with some other avalanche safety methods. In 2026 a live rescue occurred at the Stevens Pass Ski Area after a solo skier was caught in an inbound avalanche and buried under 1.5-2 feet of snow.

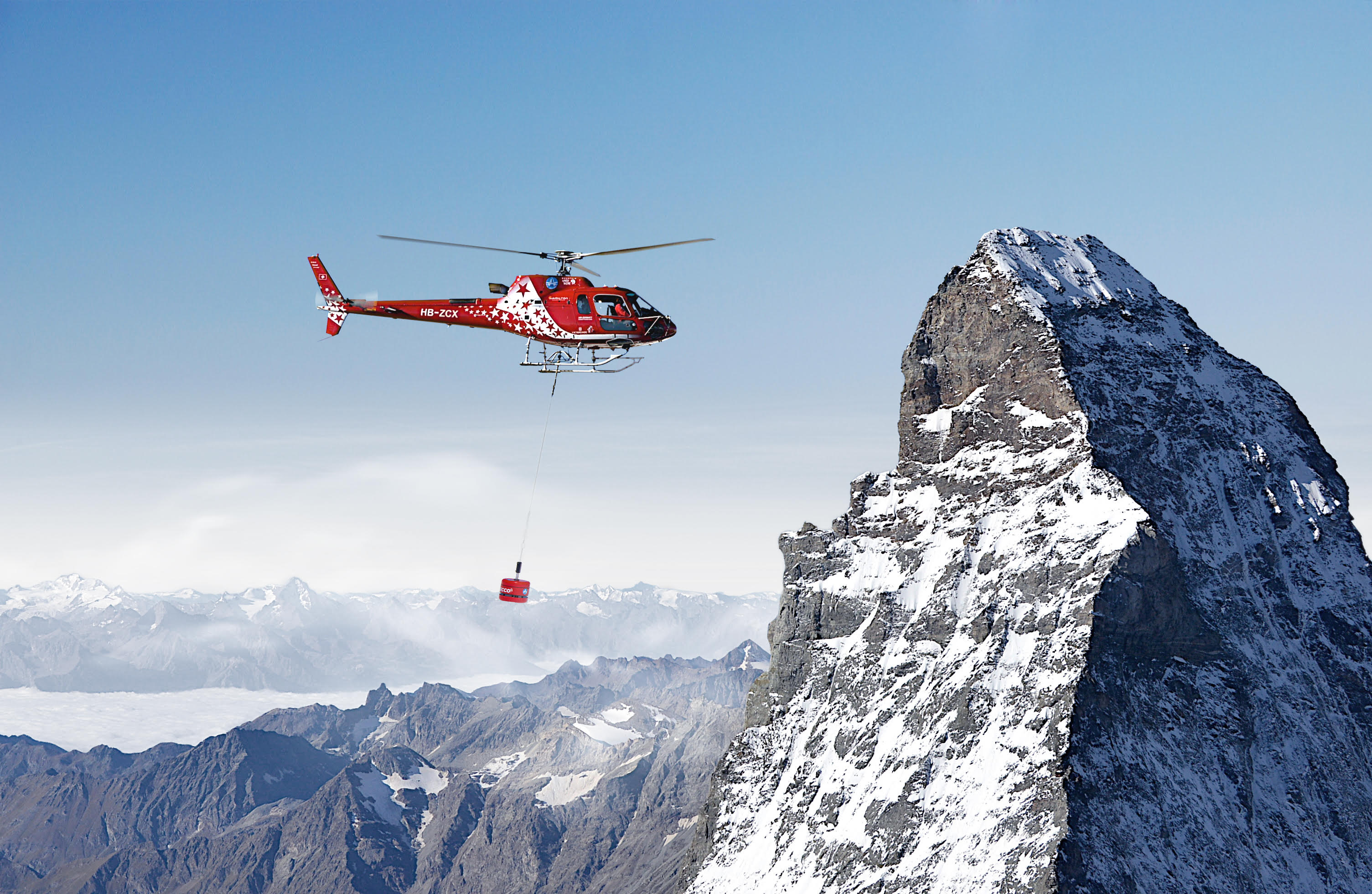
RECCO SAR helicopter detector

=== Outdoor rescue ===
The RECCO SAR helicopter detector is designed for a large-scale search by professional rescue teams for missing persons in open terrain. The missing person must be equipped with a RECCO rescue reflector to be located by the detector signal. The SAR detector can search from a height of 100 meters and covering a search area of approximately 100 meters wide. The principle of locating a victim is the same as for the handheld detector with the detector sending a radar signal echoed back by the reflector. If receiving a returned signal, the rescuer can locate the lost individual.

== Other applications ==
The RECCO technology has also been applied to tracking some amphibian species, especially tropical frogs. The system allows researchers to track small frogs in their natural habitat. During 2000‒2004 RECCO equipment was tested for tracking ground beetles.
