= Avalanche Canada =

Avalanche Canada is a non-government, non-profit organization whose vision is to eliminate avalanche fatalities and injuries in Canada. Avalanche Canada is Canada's national public avalanche safety organization. Based in Revelstoke, British Columbia, the organization's aim is to minimize public avalanche risk in avalanche terrain. Avalanche Canada develops and delivers public avalanche forecasts and special public avalanche warnings for many of the mountainous regions of western Canada, free of charge. Avalanche Canada also provides curriculum and support to instructors of recreational Avalanche Skills Training courses, delivers public avalanche education awareness and education programs, encourages public avalanche research, provides curriculum to teachers and organizations, and acts as a central hub for avalanche information.

The organization was formed in 2004 as the Canadian Avalanche Centre, following a recommendation for the establishment for a national avalanche centre, which was made in a report prepared for the Government of British Columbia. This report was written after 29 people were killed by avalanches in Canada during the winter of 2002-03, including seven high school students in the 2003 Connaught Creek Valley avalanche.

In October 2014 the Canadian Avalanche Centre officially changed its name to Avalanche Canada.
