= International Commission for Alpine Rescue =

ICAR Logo

The International Commission for Alpine Rescue (ICAR) is an international association of mountain rescue organization. Founded in 1948, ICAR is headquartered in Kloten, Switzerland.

ICAR currently has 85 member organizations in 34 countries. The official ICAR languages are English, German and French.

== Structure ==
The top organizational body is the ICAR Assembly of Delegates, where member organizations are represented by delegates (number of delegates depending on the type of membership). The Assembly usually meets in October upon the annual ICAR Convention. The Convention is alternately organized by different member organizations.

The Assembly appoints members for the ICAR Executive Board (President, Vice-President, Treasury, Technical Commission Presidents and Assessors, all of them volunteers), which takes care of the daily business through the year.
